= Open-source video game =

Video game whose source code is open-source software

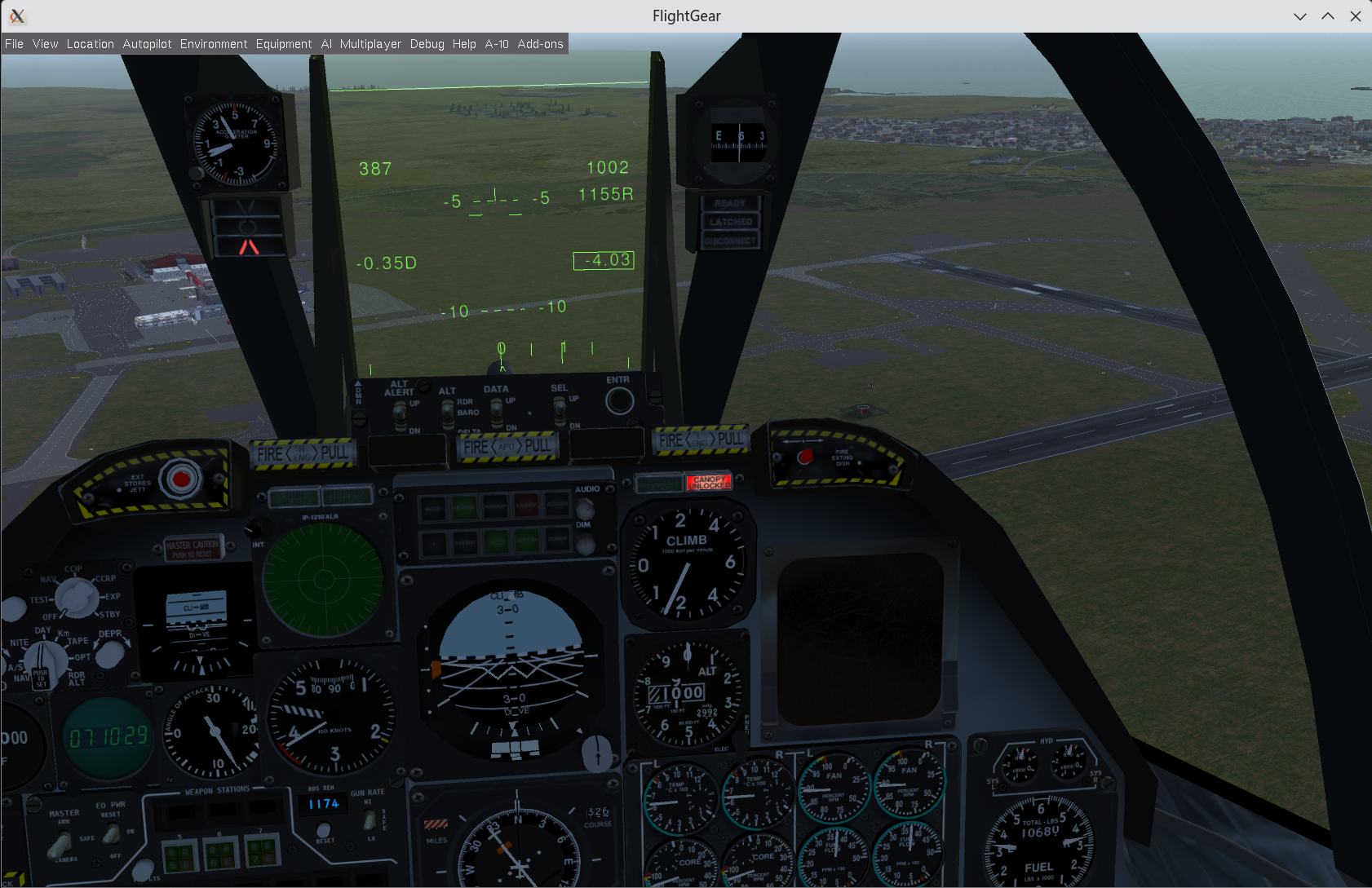
FlightGear flight simulator

An open-source video game, or simply an open-source game, is a video game whose source code is open-source. They are often freely distributable and sometimes cross-platform compatible.

== Definition and differentiation ==
Not all open-source games are free software; some open-source games contain proprietary non-free content. Open-source games that are free software and contain exclusively free content conform to DFSG, free culture, and open content and are sometimes called free games. Many Linux distributions require for inclusion that the game content is freely redistributable, freeware or commercial restriction clauses are prohibited.

== Background ==
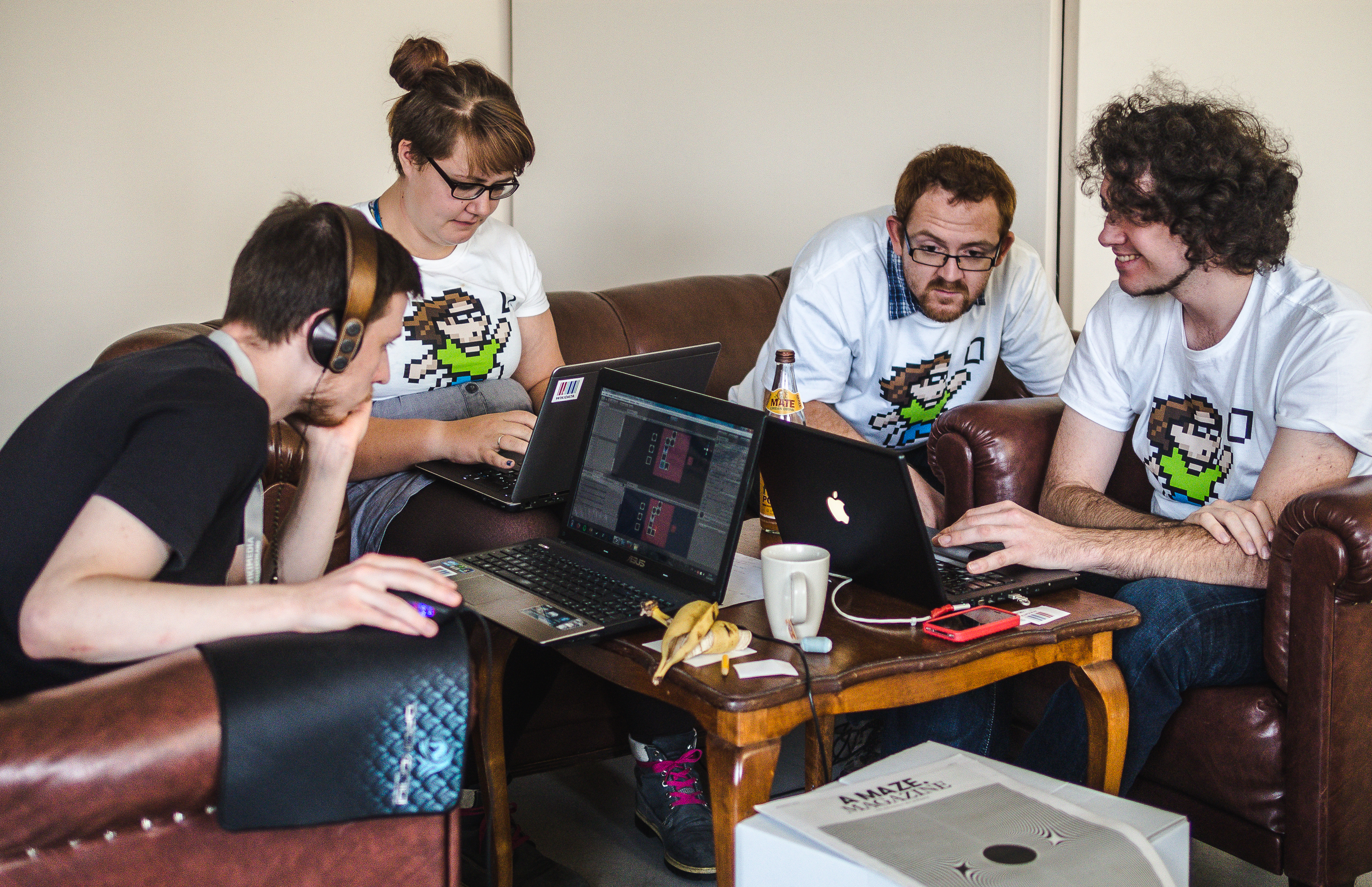
Participants in the Free Knowledge Game Jam 2015, an open source and open data oriented game jam

In general, open-source games are developed by relatively small groups of people in their free time, with profit not being the main focus. Many open-source games are volunteer-run projects, and as such, developers of free games are often hobbyists and enthusiasts. The consequence of this is that open-source games often take longer to mature, are less common and often lack the production value of commercial titles. In the 1990s a challenge to build high-quality content for games was the missing availability or the excessive price for tools like 3D modeller or toolsets for level design.

In recent years, this changed and availability of open-source tools like Blender, game engines and libraries drove open source and independent video gaming. FLOSS game engines, like the Godot game engine, as well as libraries, like SDL, are increasingly common in game development, even proprietary ones. Given that game art is not considered software, there is debate about the philosophical or ethical obstacles in selling a game where its art is proprietary but the entire source code is free software.

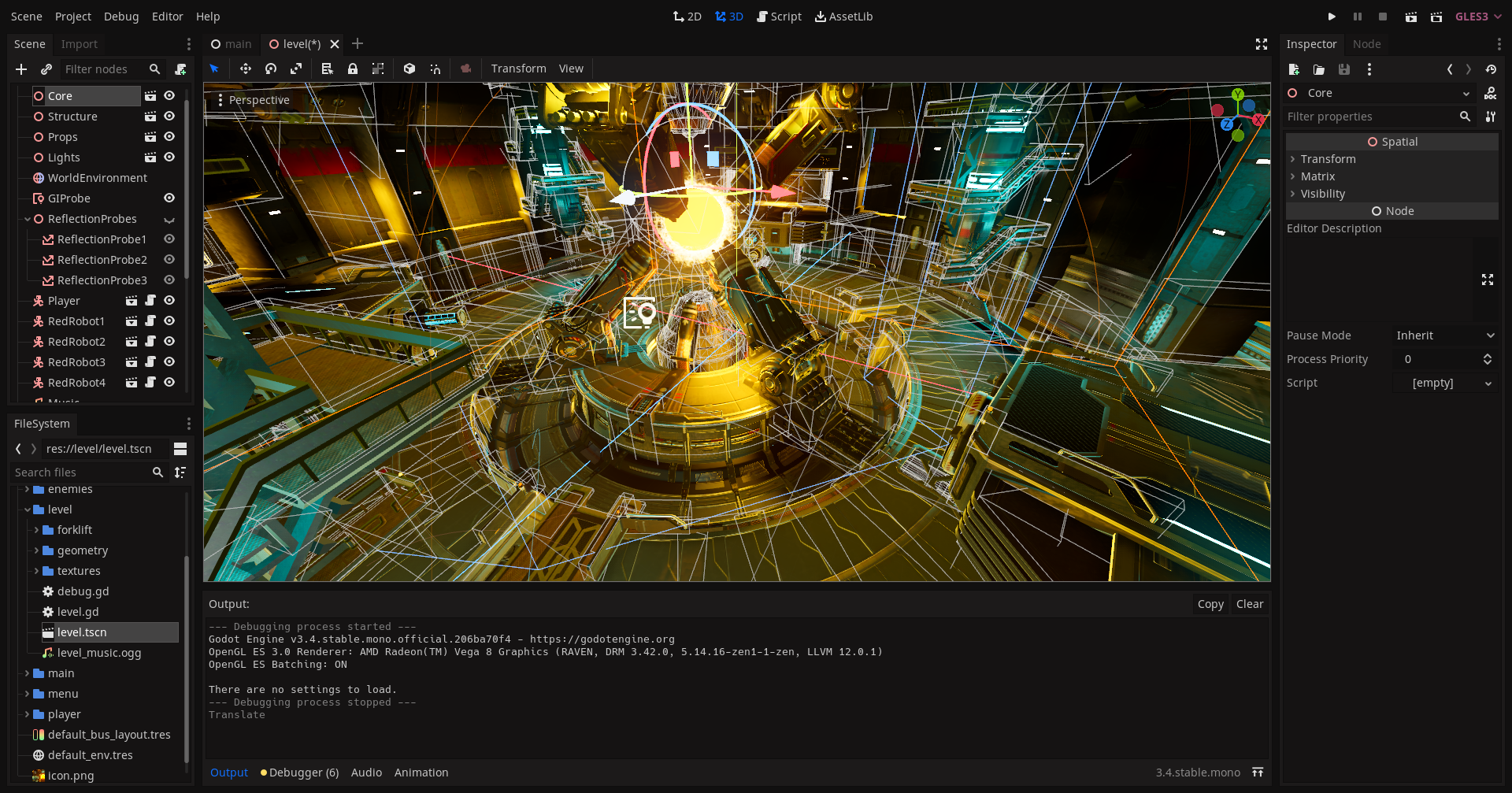
Godot engine editor

Some of the open-source game projects are based on formerly proprietary games, whose source code was released as open-source software, while the game content (such as graphics, audio and levels) may or may not be under a free license. Examples include Warzone 2100 (a real-time strategy game) and Micropolis (a city-building simulator based on the SimCity source code). Advantage of such continuation projects is that these games are already "complete" as graphic and audio content is available, and therefore the open-source authors can focus on porting, fixing bugs or modding the games.

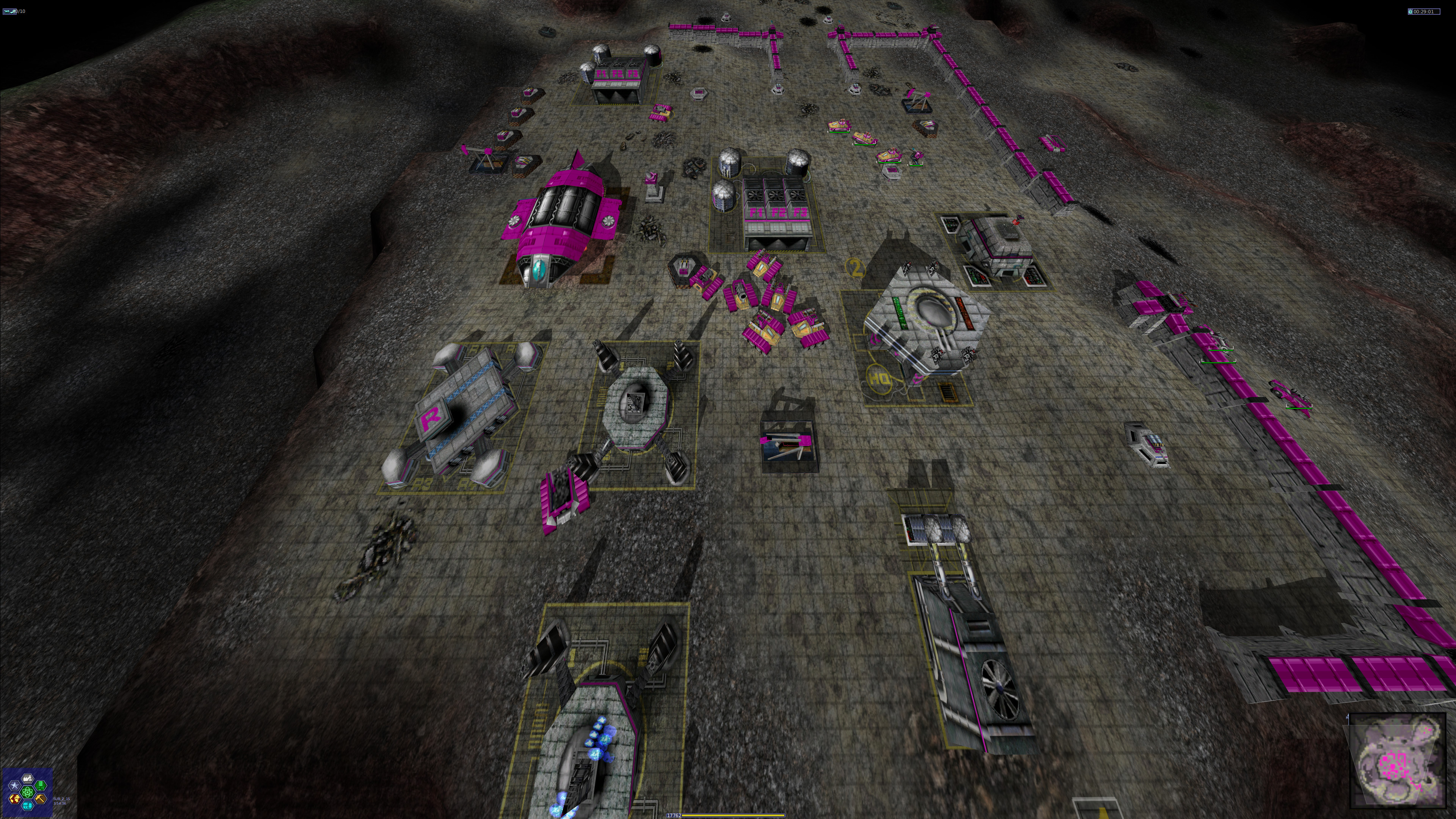
Warzone 2100

In a 2004 article, Adam Geitgey questioned the compatibility of the open-source culture with respect to the game development process. He suggested that perceived open-source development advantages do not work for games because users move on to new games relatively quickly and so do not give back to the project. Geitgey further noted that music and art development is not built up from the work of others in the same way that coding would be. He argued that high quality art content is required, which is typically produced commercially by paid artists. While Linux operates on the open-source philosophy, this may not benefit game development.

As of September 2015, the Steam gaming service has 1,500 games available on Linux, compared to 2,323 games for Mac and 6,500 Windows games.

== History ==
=== Beginnings and early games ===
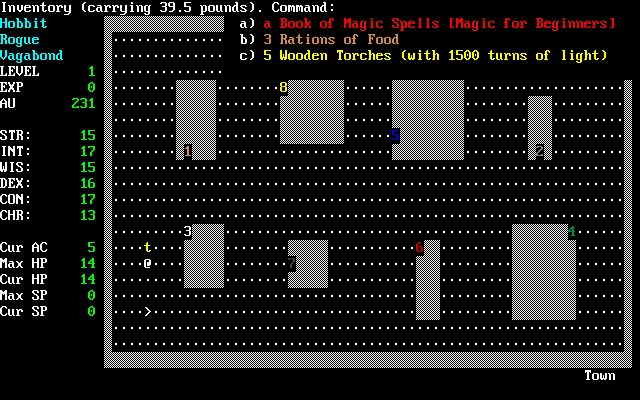
Angband

Just as in most other forms of software, free software was an unconscious occurrence during the creation of early computer games, particularly for earlier Unix games. These are mostly arcade conversions, parlour games, and text adventures using libraries like curses. A notable example of this is the "BSD Games", a collection of interactive fiction and other text-mode titles. Game fan communities such as the modding community do include some aspects of free software, such as sharing mods across community sites, sometimes with free to use media made for the modification.

With the rise of proprietary software in the mid to late 1980s, games became more and more proprietary. However, this also led to the first deliberately free games such as GNU Backgammon, GNU Chess, GNU Go, and GNU Shogi of the GNU Project established in 1983, part of whose goal is to create a complete free software system, games included. More advanced free gaming projects emerged, such as Moria and its descendant Angband, Hack and its derivatives NetHack and Slash'EM, in addition to Xtrek successor Netrek, variants of robots, and adventure game Dunnet, which has been included with GNU Emacs since 1994 among others. Still developed and played today, front-ends for frameworks such as X11, SDL, GTK and Qt, plus fuller featured variants such as Vulture's Eye have kept the games accessible. Roguelikes have continued to be produced, including Cataclysm: Dark Days Ahead, Tales of Maj'Eyal, HyperRogue, DRL, Egoboo, Shattered Pixel Dungeon, as well as Linley's Dungeon Crawl and its offspring Dungeon Crawl Stone Soup. The source code to the original Rogue was released under the BSD license in 1986.

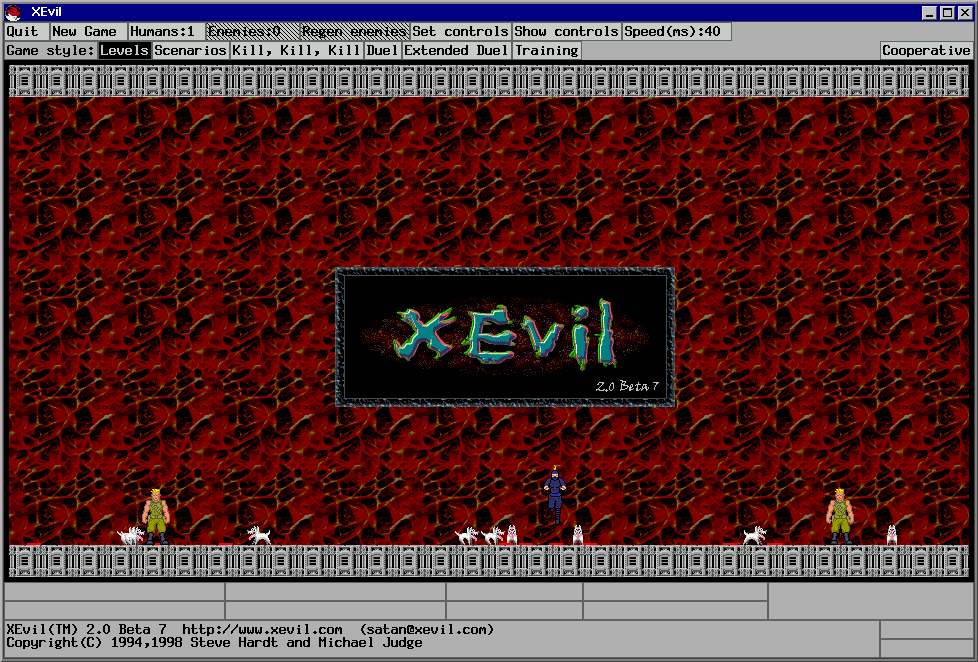
XEvil

As PC gaming began to emerge in the late 1980s, free gaming also advanced. More complicated games utilizing the X Window System for graphics started to appear, most beginning with the signature letter X. These included Xconq and XPilot. XBill is notable as one of the earliest free gaming titles to feature an activist theme of halting proprietary software adoption. XEvil followed the development cycle of many early pieces of free software, having originally been developed as a university project on the Project Athena network, although it was freeware for a while. The game was also one of the first free titles to feature controversial subject matter such as graphic violence and drug use. XTux was also an early deathmatch game for Linux, featuring various free software mascots, a theme that would continue to be revisited. Rocks'n'Diamonds is another earlier free software game, and one of the first for Linux. Other games targeted or also supported the SVGAlib library allowing them to run without a windowing system, such as LinCity and Maelstrom. The General Graphics Interface was also utilized, with games like Heroes and Thrust.

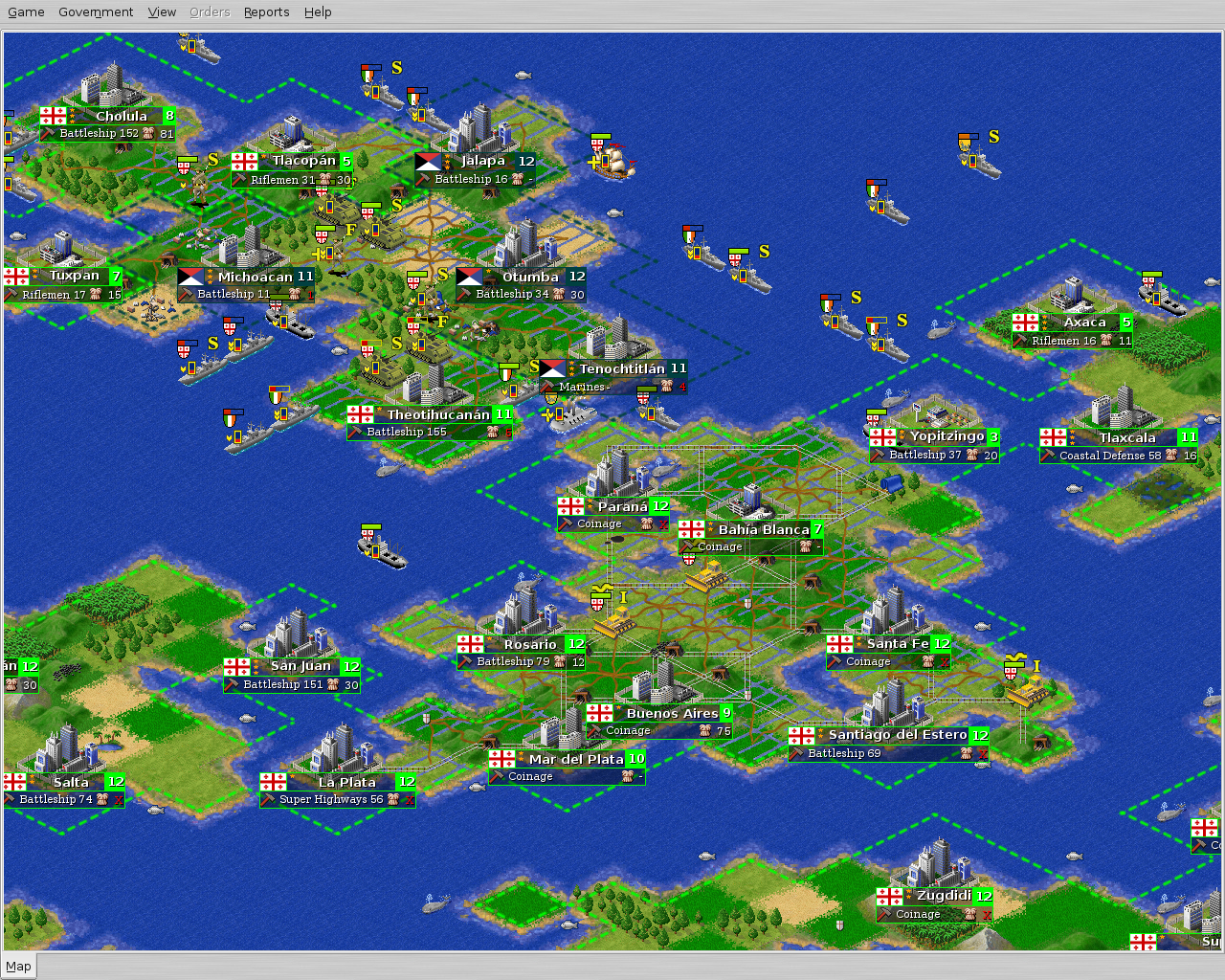
FreeCiv

The Freeciv project was started in 1995 and gave rise to another new style of free game development. Similar to the cooperative nature of the Linux kernel development, Freeciv was extended by many volunteers, rather than only one or two authors. It had started out as a small university student project but then branched out into its current form and is still being developed today. Freeciv also proved to be one of the earliest very popular free software games, and was among the first to be included with Linux distributions, a system commonly known now as a source of peer review or selection of quality for free gaming projects. Magazines, news sources and websites have also started noting free games, often in listings. Freeciv and other archetypes have led to the development of many other clones of popular proprietary games. Lincity was also started in 1995, despite there having been a Unix version of its namesake officially released by DUX Software in 1990.

Beyond directly tying to the operating system, various free game development frameworks emerged starting with Allegro in 1990, SDL in 1998, ClanLib in 1999, OpenAL in 2000, SFML in 2007, as well as SDL 2 and Raylib in 2013. The GNU Image Manipulation Program, MyPaint, Krita, Inkscape, Synfig, Pencil2D, Audacity, Rosegarden, OpenShot, Kdenlive, Pitivi, Blender, MakeHuman, and other applications have provided an entire open source toolchain for creative projects. Various free software emulators and compatibility layers have also been produced, such as MAME and MESS, Mednafen, higan, Executor, Darling, lxrun, Cygwin, Dosbox, ScummVM, Anbox, Wine and Proton, allowing games to run in new environments (broadly targeted by the RetroArch front-end).

=== 3D games and source releases ===
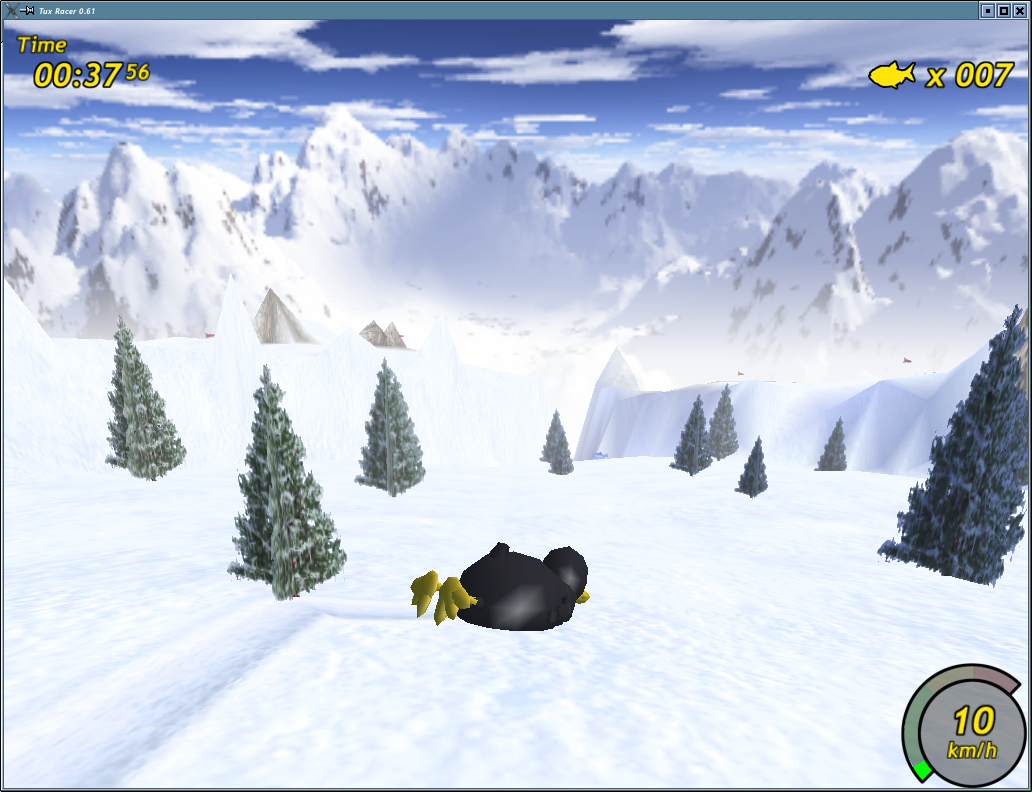
Tux Racer

Proprietary games such as Doom and Descent brought in the age of three-dimensional games in the early to mid 1990s, and free games started to make the switch themselves. Tuxedo T. Penguin: A Quest for Herring by Steve Baker, a game featuring the Linux mascot Tux, was an early example of a three-dimensional free software game. He and his son Oliver would later create other popular 3D free games and clones such as TuxKart and contribute to those by other developers such as Tux Racer. BZFlag pre-dates all of these, inspired by Battlezone and started in 1992 and released in 1993. FlightGear and YSFlight are additional examples of original 3D games, first started in 1997 and 1999 respectively, especially noting that they are not first-person shooters but flight simulators; Danger from the Deep meanwhile simulates submarines.

The OpenGL specification provided a foundation for hardware acceleration since 1992, primarily through the free Mesa implementation since 1995, and later complimented by Vulkan since 2016. The Direct3D API has also been made available on free operating systems via compatibility layers such as WineD3D and DXKV. The Glide API was also made open source following the dissolution of 3dfx in 2002.

The Genesis3D engine project, Crystal Space and Cube also spawned other 3D free software engines and games, later joined by the likes of Delta3D and Dim3. Engines even exist for high-level programming languages such as Python and Pascal. Several engines exist with rendering in low-level C or C++ with higher level scripting, such as Panda3D for Python, Basic4GL, and Cafu for Lua, or offering a variety of language binding options such as Cocos3D, Horde3D, OGRE and the Irrlicht Engine. The games Yo Frankie! and Sintel The Game were developed by the Blender Foundation to showcase the abilities of the Blender modelling tool and the erstwhile Blender Game Engine, which has since been forked as UPBGE. Since May 2023, the GDevelop tool allows low to no code 3D game creation.

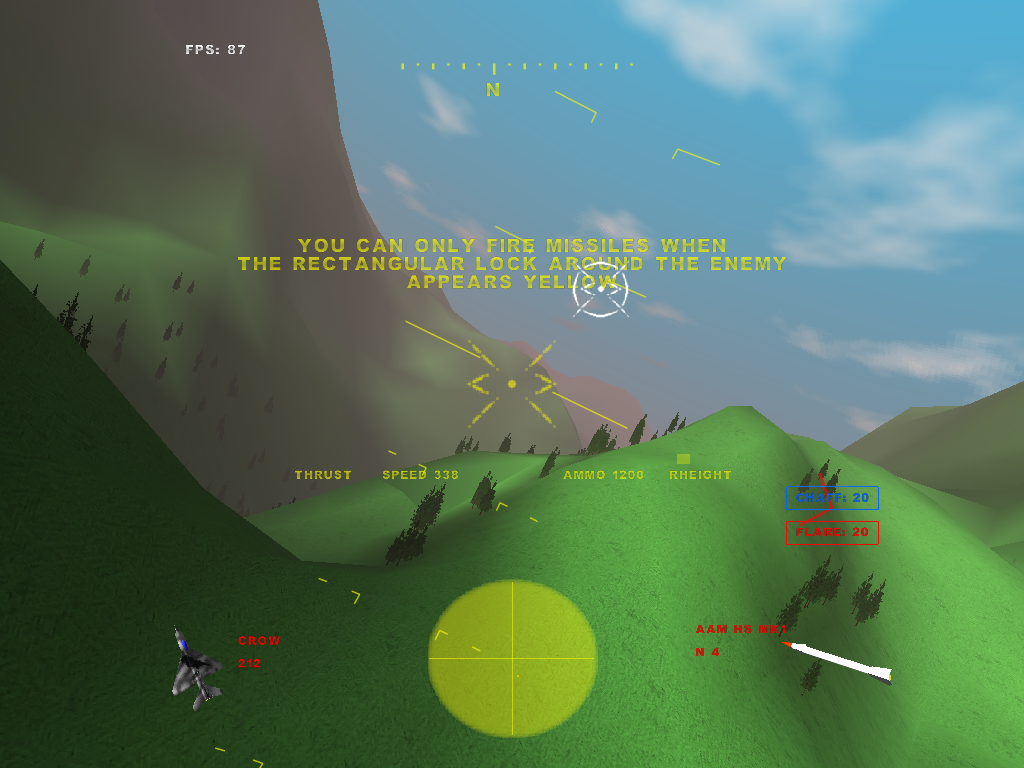
GL-117

id Software, an early entrant into commercial Linux gaming, would also prove to be an early supporter of free gaming when John Carmack released the source code for Wolfenstein 3D in 1995 and Doom in 1997, first under a custom license and then later the GNU General Public License (GPL) in 1999. This was followed by the release of Quake engine in 1999, the Quake II engine in 2001 (known as id Tech 2), id Tech 3 in 2004 and most recently id Tech 4 in 2011 (including the updated version from the Doom 3: BFG Edition in 2012) before Carmack left id in 2013.

id Tech 4 was released as free software, even amongst patent concerns from Creative Labs over Carmack's reverse, while the original Doom source release shipped without music due to complications with the Cygnus Studios developed DMX library (which lead to the Linux version being selected for release). Carmack has continued to advise developers to be careful when depending on middleware, noting how it can limit the possibilities of later releasing source code. Tim Sweeney has implied this issue has hindered potential releases of older Unreal Engine source code. The Godot, Nebula Device, Plasma, Torque, Bork3D, Stride, PlayCanvas, Dagor Engine, and Defold engines were also initially commercial and proprietary, while the Open 3D Engine is derived from released code from Amazon Lumberyard originally based on CryEngine.

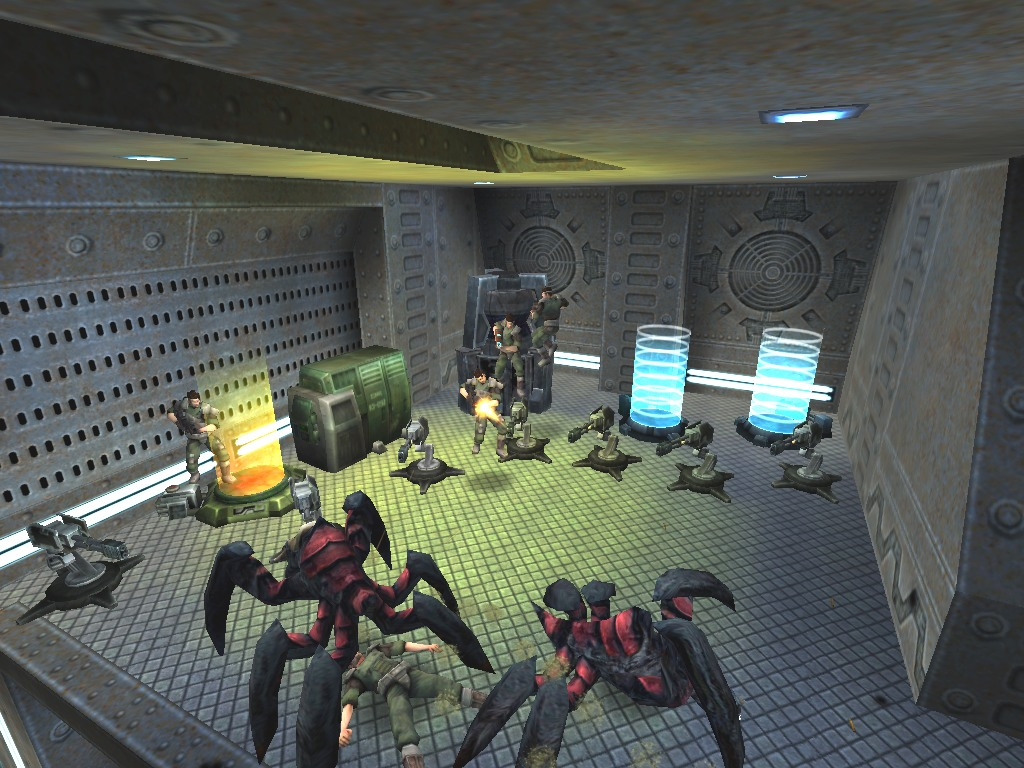
Tremulous

This led not only to source ports that allowed the playing of the non-free games based on these engines (plus fan added enhancements) on free engines and systems, but has also to the production of standalone free games. These include Freedoom, Blasphemer, Open Quartz, LibreQuake, Nexuiz/Xonotic, Tremulous/Unvanquished, and OpenArena on id Tech. Freeware games, such as Harmony, Alien Arena, World of Padman, and Urban Terror, have also taken advantage of these free engines and sometimes have given code back to the community. Development and editing tools are also commonly released freely, such as GtkRadiant, Qoole, Doom Builder, and LibreSprite. Released engines have also been used for fangames such as Sonic Robo Blast 2, Wolfenstein: Blade of Agony, Project Osiris, ZBlood/Transfusion, SUPERQOT, and Slayer's Testament, and even commercial games such as Wrath: Aeon of Ruin, and Steel Storm, on the DarkPlaces engine, as well as titles by Blendo Games on the id Tech 2 and id Tech 4 engines. The game Ion Fury is built on the source available Build engine, and Excalibur: Morgana's Revenge on Aleph One.

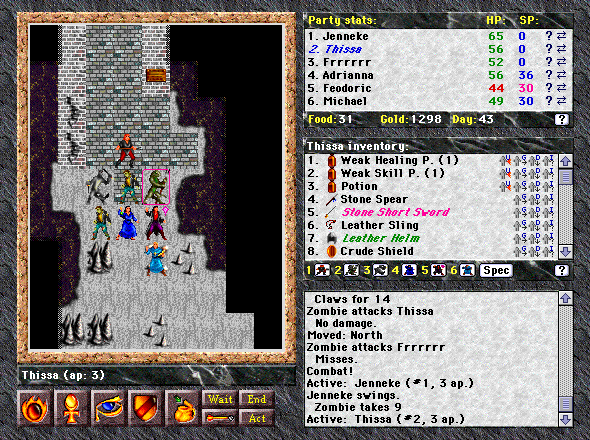
Blades of Exile

id partners and related, such as Raven Software, Bungie, Volition, GarageGames, Cyan Worlds, and 3D Realms, as well as Two Tribes, Pangea Software, former developers from Capstone Software, Fields of Vision, Virtual Design, and Black Magic Software, and several of the developers who participated in the Humble Indie Bundle, have also released code and it is now accepted practice for some mainstream game developers to release legacy source code. Formerly proprietary games such as Jump 'n Bump, Dink Smallwood, Clonk, Seven Kingdoms, AstroMenace, Warzone 2100, Glitch, Maelstrom, Avara, Blades of Exile, Star Control 2, SimCity, Fish Fillets, HoverRace, Duelyst, as well Abuse and the unfinished Golgotha have even been entirely released freely, including multimedia assets and levels.

Some games are mostly free software but contain proprietary content such as the Cube sequel, Sauerbraten (and later forks, but not Red Eclipse), Warsow / Warfork, or the former id Tech mods The Dark Mod and Smokin' Guns, but some developers desire and/or work on replacing these with free content. Mods for originally proprietary games have gone standalone following the source code being released for their parent game, such as Nexuiz for Quake, Alien Arena for Quake II, and Urban Terror for Quake III, as well as Penumbra: Necrologue for Amnesia: The Dark Descent. Derivatives of released code or recreations have even been used for commercial re-releases of vintage games such as Wolfenstein 3D Classic for iOS, Abuse Classic for iPhone, Marathon 2: Durandal for Xbox Live Arcade, Duke Nukem and Duke Nukem II for the Evercade, and The Original Strife: Veteran Edition. Source code releases were used however for unauthorized versions of Lugaru and Abuse that were allowed onto the App Store prior to takedown claims by the original developers.

Primarily proprietary developers have also helped free gaming by creating free libraries. Loki Software helped create and maintain the Simple DirectMedia Layer and OpenAL libraries and Linux Game Publishing created and maintained the free network layer Grapple. LGP also avoided publishing games similar to popular free titles. Many libraries/infrastructures have been created without corporate assistance however, such as Mumble voice over IP, OBS Studio for screencasting, and the Lutris game manager. Physics engines such as Box2D, Bullet, Chipmunk, Open Dynamics Engine, Newton Game Dynamics and PhysX have been made available as open source. In addition, various game creation systems are free software such as versions of Game Editor, Adventure Game Studio, OHRRPGCE, Game-Maker, the engine behind Stencyl, the original Construct, GDevelop and Godot.

=== Rise in popularity and diversity ===
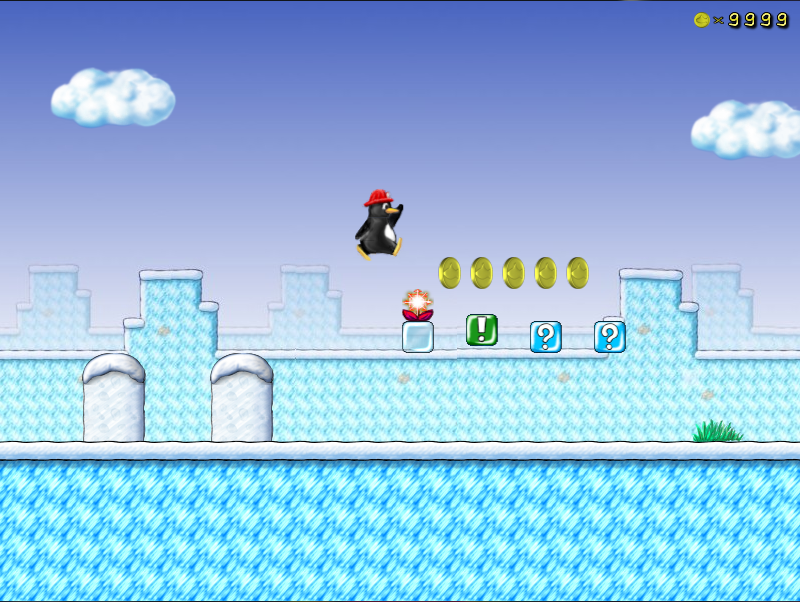
SuperTux

Individuals and teams have continued creating many popular free software games, starting really in the late 1990s to the present day. Many of these are clones such as Pingus (Lemmings), Enigma (Oxyd), Beats of Rage (Streets of Rage), TetriNET (Tetris), Blobby Volley (Arcade Volleyball), Rocks'n'Diamonds (Boulder Dash), UltraStar (SingStar), OpenClonk (Clonk), Scorched 3D (Scorched Earth), Triplane Turmoil (Sopwith), Luanti (Minecraft),Zaz (Zuma), Pioneer and Oolite (Elite), SuperTux, Secret Maryo Chronicles and Mari0 (Super Mario Bros.), Frets on Fire (Guitar Hero), and StepMania (Dance Dance Revolution).

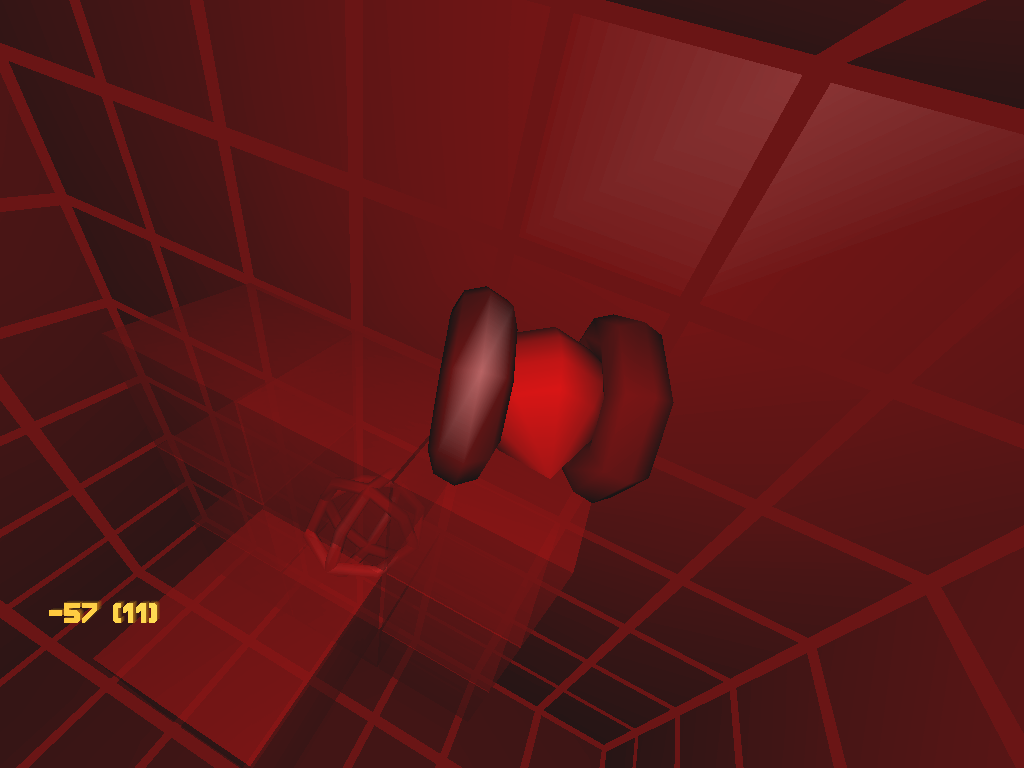
kiki the nanobot

Frozen Bubble, originally a clone of Puzzle Bobble, has become a classic known for its addictive gameplay and winner of many Linux Journal Reader's Choice Awards. These games and others have also helped expand the prevalent Tux genre which started with titles and like A Quest for Herring and are related to the activist content of games like XBill. As well as ground up clones, open source re-implementations of various proprietary games have become increasingly common, which utilize the original game data.

More original games such as the platformer Teeworlds, puzzle games such as kiki the nano bot and The Powder Toy, and arcade games such as C-Dogs, Chromium B.S.U., have been able to carve out their own niches.

A number of these games and those mentioned earlier and later in this section have received mainstream press coverage and commercial compilations, and have helped to establish free gaming as a moderately popular pastime, most prominently among Linux users and other free Unix-like systems. As well, open source games have been made available for Palm OS, Android, and iOS mobile devices. Additionally, these games provide options for a variety of alternative and hobbyist systems.

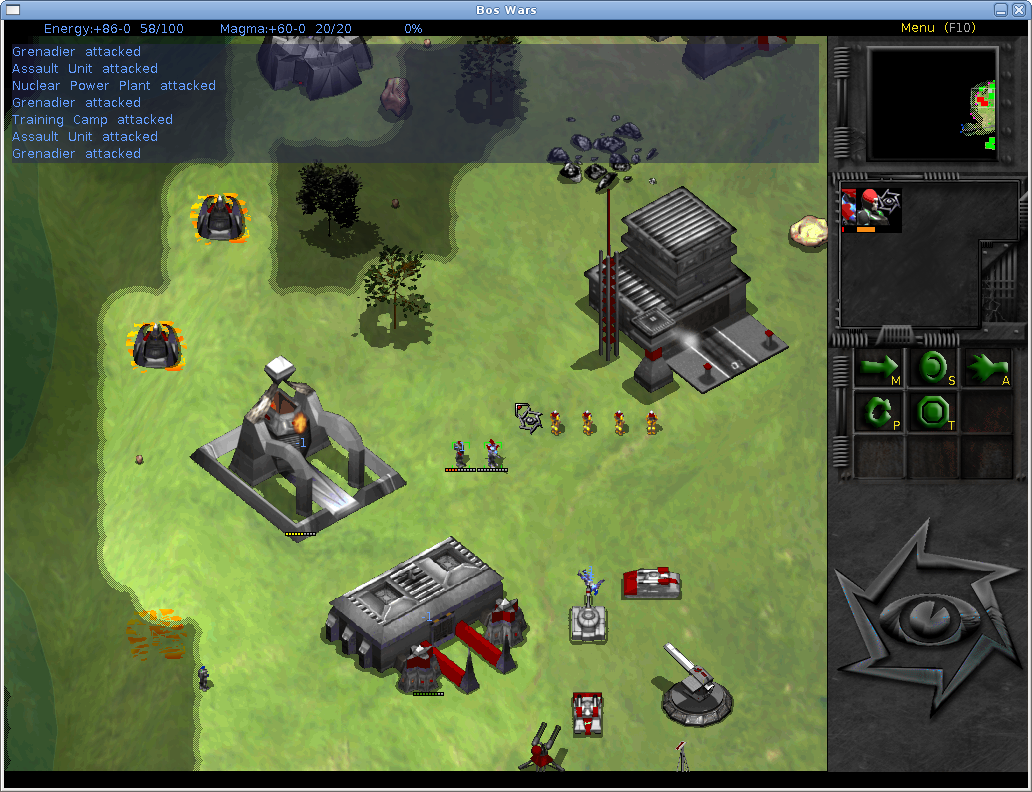
Bos Wars

Strategy and simulation games have been a prevalent force in free software gaming, partly due to the lack of proprietary options for free software operating systems as compared to other genres like first-person shooters and role-playing games. Xconq and XBattle, and later Freeciv and Lincity, began the trend, and were followed by other clone titles like FreeCol, C-evo, OpenCity, TripleA, Mindustry, OpenRCT2, OpenTTD, Simutrans, Tenés Empanadas Graciela, Endgame: Singularity, Thousand Parsec, Unknown Horizons and Widelands.

The Stratagus project began as an attempt to recreate the proprietary Warcraft II engine, under the name FreeCraft. Blizzard Entertainment sent a cease and desist letter in 2003 over the use of the name "craft" in comparison to Warcraft and StarCraft. Though the earlier free software strategy game CRAFT: The Vicious Vikings shared the name "craft" without controversy. With the new, legally inoffensive name Stratagus and the old FreeCraft assets renamed Aleona's Tales, the team began work on a new strategy game called Bos Wars.

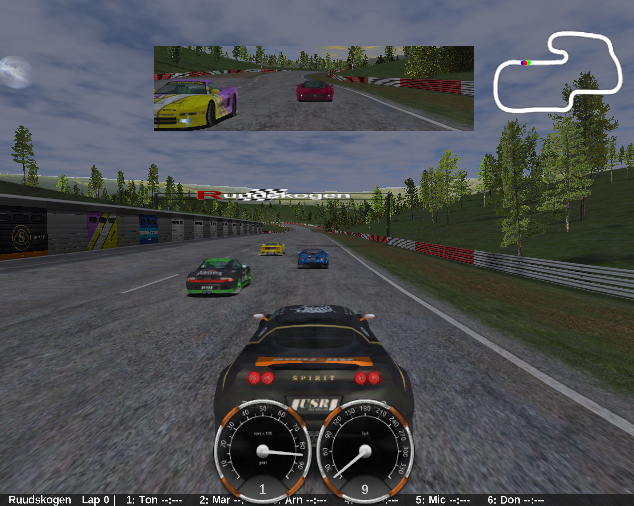
Speed Dreams

After the Stratagus example, other real-time strategy games were developed, such as Globulation 2, which experiments with game management mechanics, the similarly experimental Liquid War, the 3D project 0 A.D. (a former freeware project), and Glest.

Racing games, another uncommon Linux commercial genre, have also seen development. One of the earliest was RARS, which evolved following the principle of forking into TORCS and then Speed Dreams. Other racing games include versions of Racer, VDrift, Rigs of Rods, GLtron and Armagetron Advanced, the Mario Kart–inspired SuperTuxKart, Elasto Mania clone X-Moto, sledding game Extreme Tux Racer, and Dust Racing 2D.

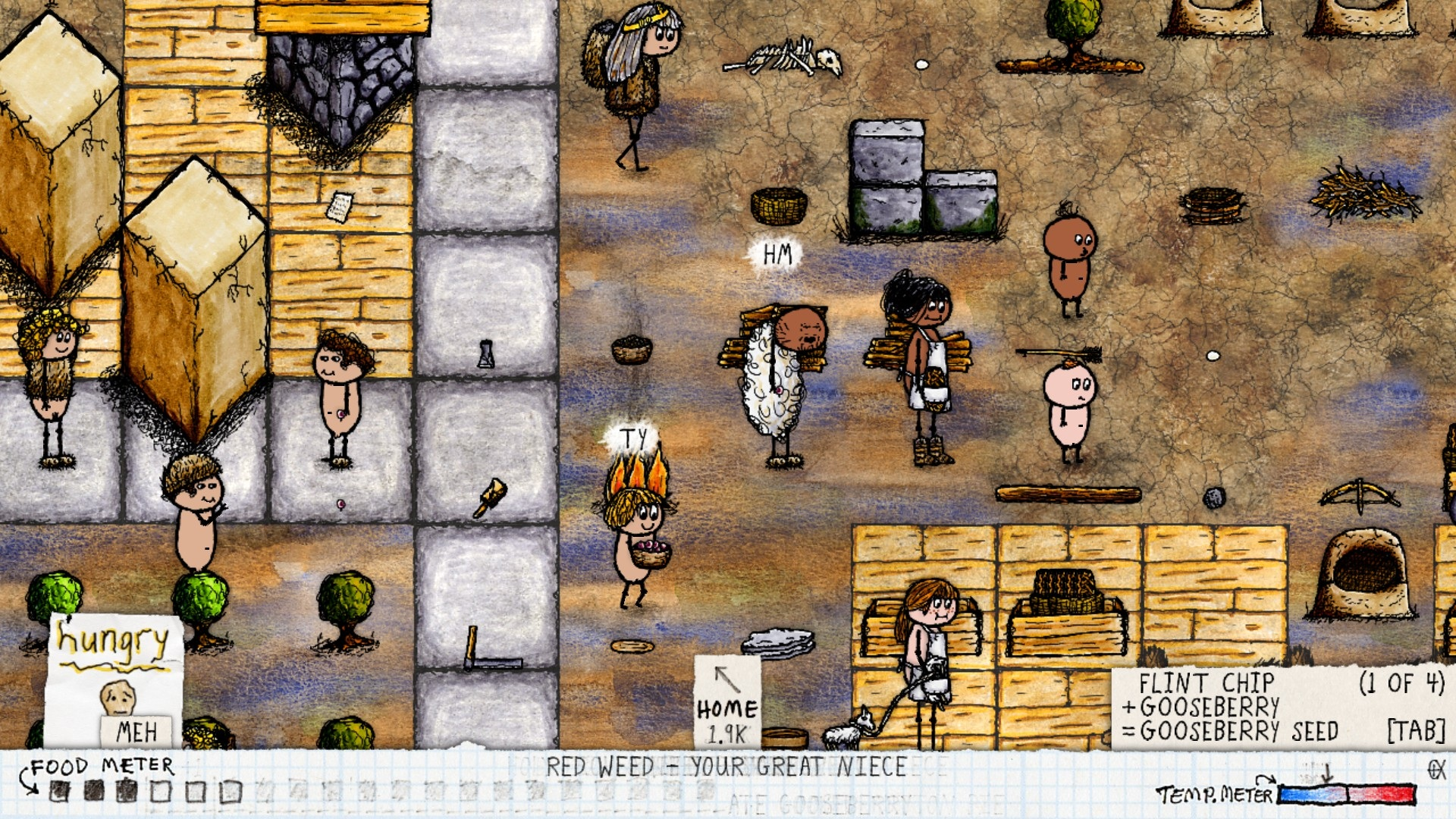
One Hour One Life

WorldForge, Ryzom, Crossfire, and Solipsis are further examples of increasing diversification, offering free massively multiplayer online role-playing game worlds. Single-player role-playing games are also available, such as A Dark Room and GNU FreeDink.

The rise of the independent game development in the 2000s and 2010s was partly driven by the growing ecosystem of open-source libraries and engines; indie developers utilized the open-source ecosystem due to good cross-platform capabilities and availability for limited financial burden. Game jams such as Ludum Dare and Game Off are often run on open source principles, frequently using free frameworks. Educational languages such as Snap! and Scratch are also free software. Individual developers such as Jason Rohrer, creator of Passage and One Hour One Life, and Kenta Cho have embraced open source.

=== Greater organization ===
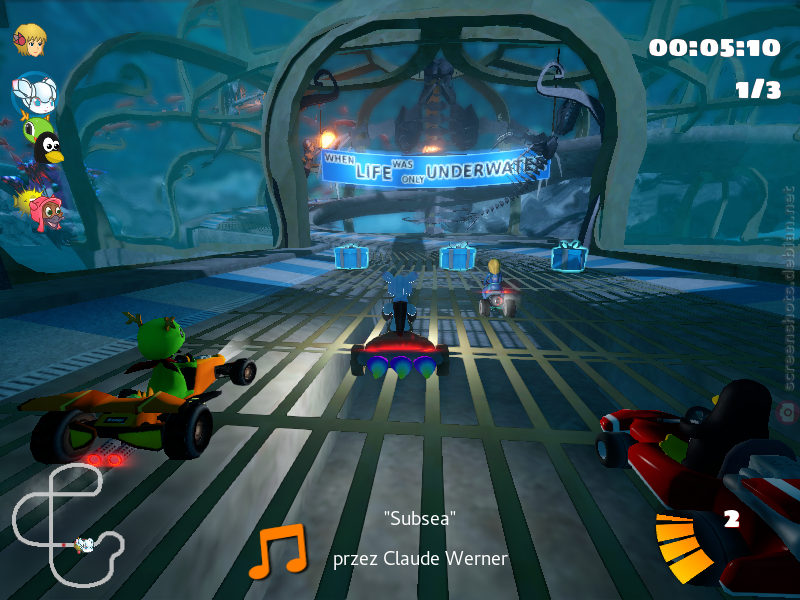
SuperTuxKart

Despite its initial roots as individual projects, the free software gaming scene has been becoming progressively more organized. The roots of this even go back as far as the games created for the GNU Project and to the original larger-scale free software projects like Freeciv. Still, for the most part free game development had very little organization throughout its history. Popular games were generally separate efforts, except for instances of people working on them known for other projects such as Ingo Ruhnke (Pingus), Bill Kendrick (SuperTux) and Steve Baker (TuxKart). Games were commonly found in directories such as The Linux Game Tome and Freshmeat and hosted on sites like SourceForge and GNU Savannah, but they were largely only ever brought together in the form of disorganized lists. Other projects and games existed purely on isolated personal or project websites, often unknown and ignored.

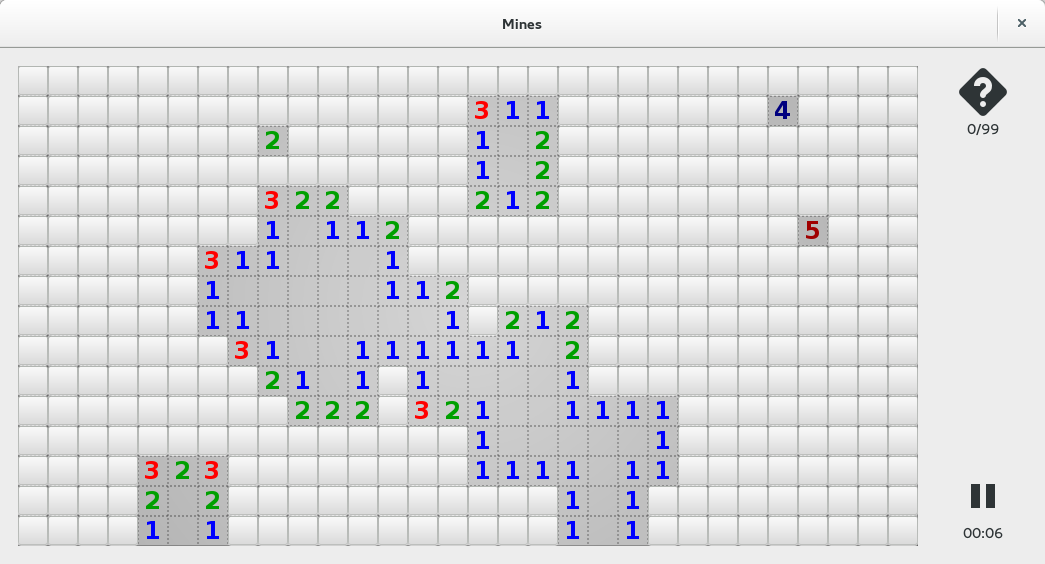
GNOME Mines

The launch of the GNOME and KDE desktop projects in the late 1990s organized application and, to a certain extent, game development. Both attempts to create a more usable Linux desktop attracted volunteers to make utilities to that end. These programs included games, mostly recreations of small games like Minesweeper or Solitaire that come with Microsoft Windows, arcade classics and the like, games from combined sets such as Microsoft Entertainment Pack, and occasionally original ideas.

The variety and number of these games, and other free games easily found in software repositories, have had GNOME or KDE-enabled Linux called a better option for out of the box casual gaming than Microsoft Windows. They also provide games for other Unix-like operating systems, such as BSD and Solaris. Many such games are packaged into kdegames and the erstwhile GNOME Games package. Although designed primarily for application development, the underlying GTK and Qt toolkits have also been used broadly for game development, as have wxWidgets, Tk, and FLTK. The availability of free game engines, such as Stratagus, Pygame, and LÖVE, have also helped unify free software development by making the engine projects themselves hubs of activity for games that make use of them.

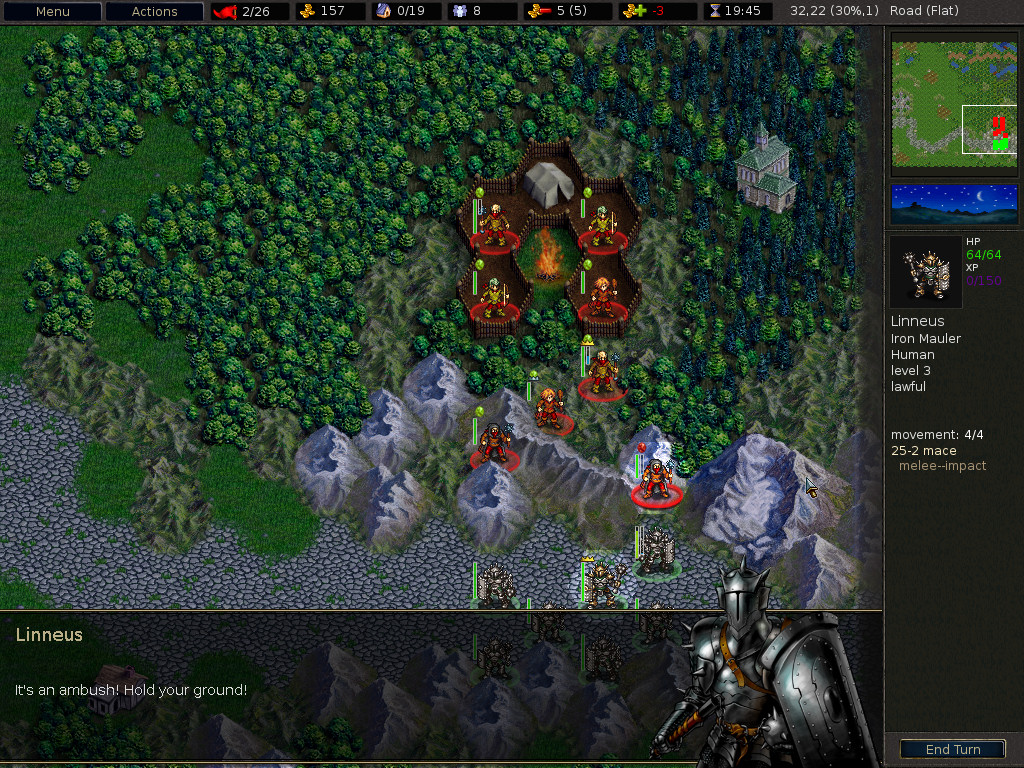
The Battle for Wesnoth

The Battle for Wesnoth project was started in 2003 and quickly became popular to both players and editors. It also showcased some new ideas when it came to free game development. Like Freeciv before it, it utilized the efforts of the gaming and free software community and their code, levels and artwork contributions but it also accepted storyline contributions and ideas for the game's entire fictional universe. The game's canon is maintained through review and discussion over which submitted campaigns become official, thus setting up a model for community input and organized results. This helped the game grow in scale and popularity to the point of being almost saga-like in scope. In addition, the project is worked on by many well-known free programmers, artists, designers and musicians such as the co-founder of the Open Source Initiative Eric S. Raymond, and Linux kernel hacker Rusty Russell. Vega Strike has similarly allowed its community to expand the game and the surrounding lore while maintaining canon consistency. The Wesnoth developers also worked on Frogatto & Friends, which features a free engine but mostly proprietary game data.

=== Hubs and development teams ===
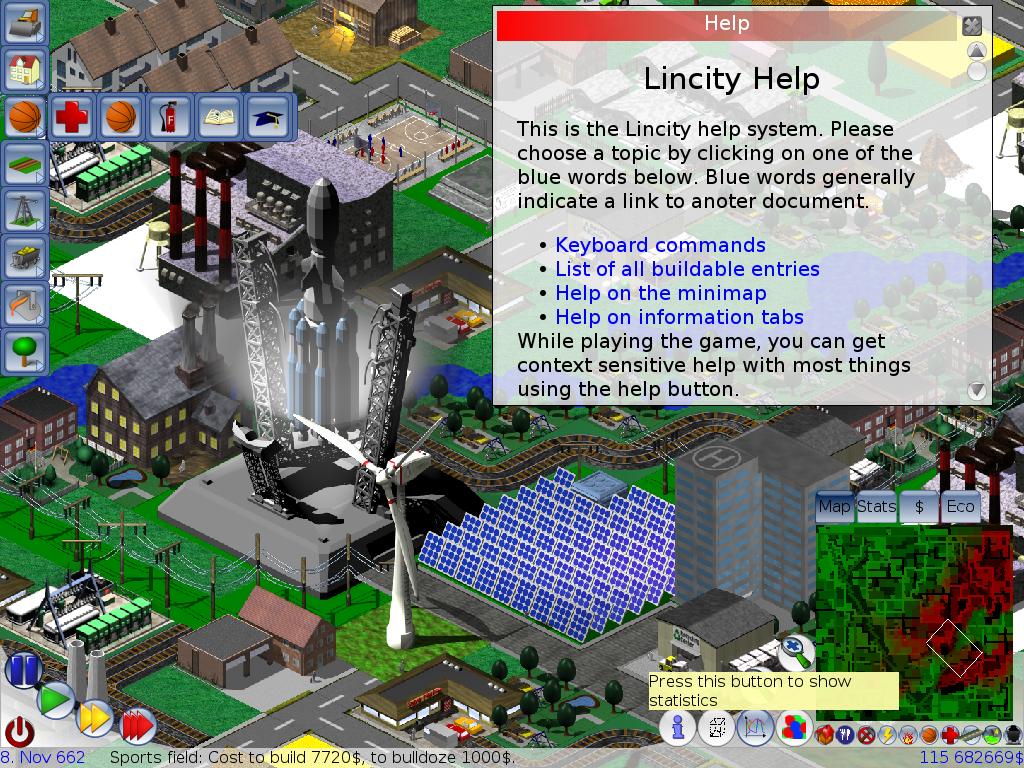
Lincity-NG

The general lack of unity and organization has created and continues to generate some controversy among the free software community, with problems of "reinventing the wheel" by making similar clones, games and multimedia resources being cited as a notable problem to free game development. This is especially taking up more notice as other problems are corrected, such as a lack of tools, libraries, artists and coders. A more central knowledge bank, texture library, and discussion area had been lacking.

Traditionally free software video games were developed as individual projects, some small scale and others larger scale. Programmers and other developers did often work on other projects, but the whole system was very unlinked. More recently free software development teams have started appearing, groups that function like software companies and create multiple pieces of work.

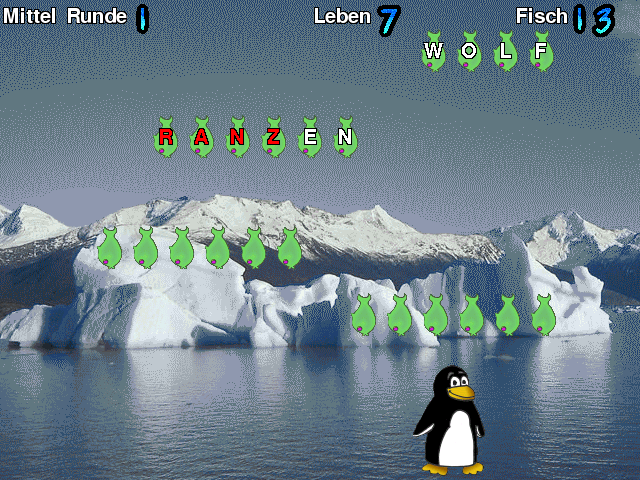
Tux Typing

The Linux Game Tome "Game of the Month" team was an open group of game developers that revamp old free software games. Some examples include the transformation of TuxKart into the more modern SuperTuxKart, work on Pingus and SuperTux, and Lincity-NG, an updated version of Lincity with superior graphics.

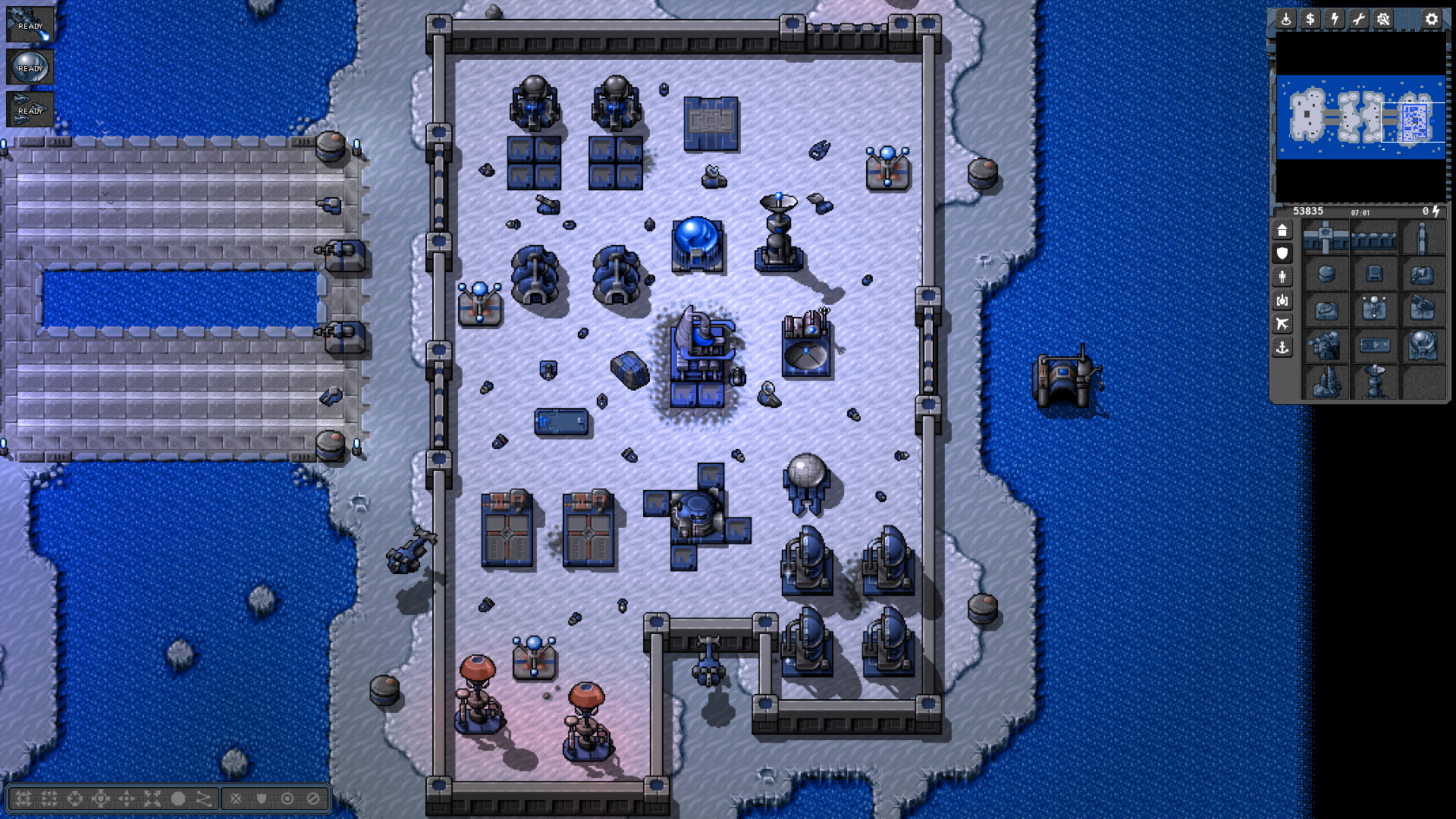
OpenHV combines the CC licensed Hard Vacuum assets with the OpenRA engine.

PlayPower is a non-profit organization founded in 2008 designed to create free educational computer software for low income families in India and other developing countries. The Tux4Kids initiative also maintains various educational games featuring the child-friendly Tux character such as Tux Paint, Tux, of Math Command, Tux Typing and related efforts. The GCompris suite is also available from KDE.

In recent years, content repositories such as OpenGameArt.org, Wikimedia Commons, Openclipart, and The Freesound Project have enabled developers to easily find appropriately-licensed content rather than relying on programmer art. Such content is often under Creative Commons licenses or those in the GNU GPL family, easily facilitating use by most free software projects. OpenGameArt.org is also affiliated with related websites such as Libregamewiki, a database of purely libre games, the Free Gamer blog and the FreeGameDev forums.

GitHub, GitLab and Gitea now host a significant number of free and open-source games. The itch.io service is also a host for many open source games, and also features an open source client. The same is true for competitor Game Jolt, and was also the case for former distributor Desura. A number of open source games have even been made available on Steam. Many free software games are also available from Flathub and Snap.

== See also ==
- List of open-source video games
- List of commercial video games with available source code
- List of freeware video games
