= Pingus =

Computer game

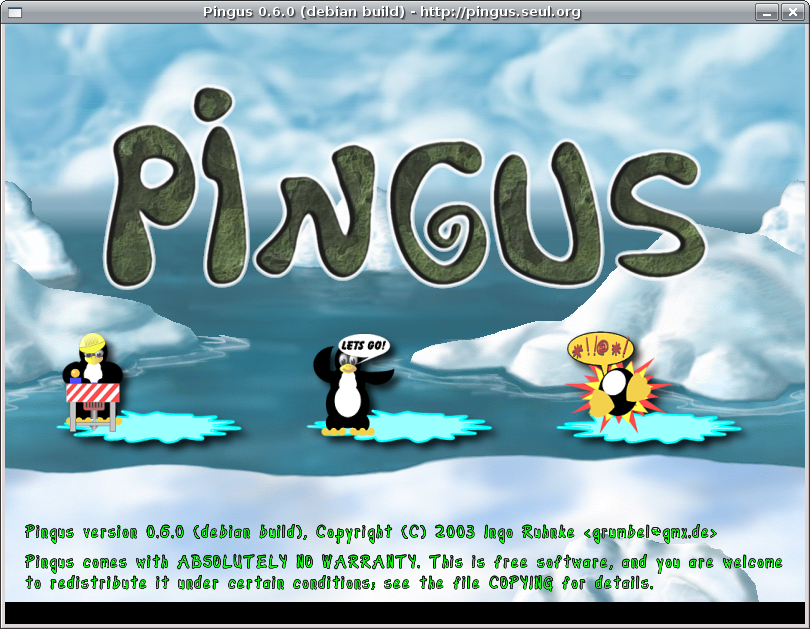
- Original author: Ingo Ruhnke
- Developer: Pingus community
- Release: 1998; 28 years ago
- Stable release: 0.7.6 / 24 December 2011; 14 years ago
- Platform: Unix-like, Microsoft Windows, Mac OS X, FreeBSD, Haiku
- Type: Strategy, puzzle
- License: GPL-3.0-or-later
- Website: pingus.seul.org
- Repository: github.com/Pingus/pingus

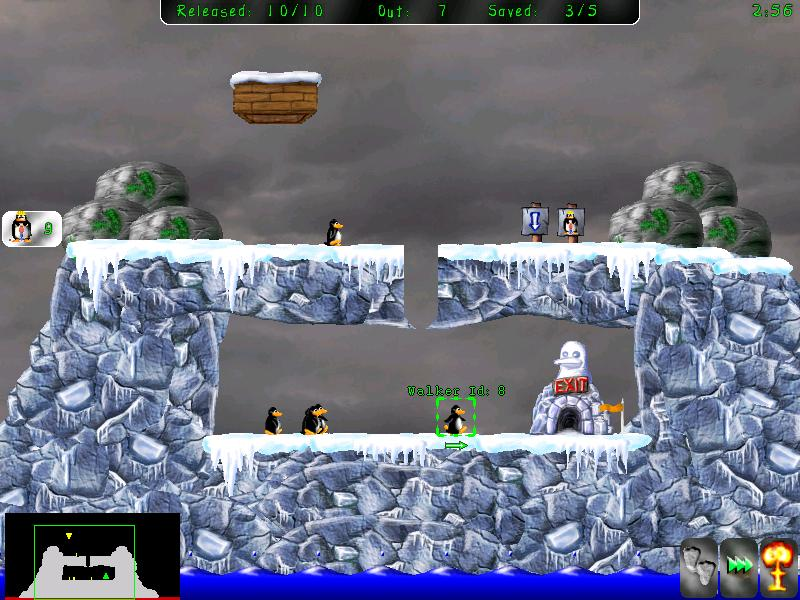
Some penguins marching in the snow

Pingus is a free software game programmed by German developer Ingo Ruhnke. It is a clone of Lemmings in which the characters are penguins instead of lemmings.

== Gameplay ==
Pingus has 77 levels, grouped into 5 level sets, as well as 21 winter-themed tutorial levels. Pingus 0.7.2 introduced 'levelsets', which are lists of related levels; levels in levelsets usually must be completed in order. However, there are many more levels included with the game not accessible from its GUI, some with entirely different graphics.

== Development ==
Work on the game began in 1998. Version 0.6 was released in 2003 for Linux, and featured new levels along with a level editor. On February 11, 2006 the game began being ported from ClanLib to Simple DirectMedia Layer (SDL). On August 27, 2007, version 0.7.0 (the first version to use SDL) was released. In addition to Windows and Linux, the switch to SDL enabled Pingus to be easily built on other platforms, including Apple's OS X. On September 23, 2007 version 0.7.1 was released with a new level editor. On October 31, 2007, version 0.7.2 was released with a set of Halloween-themed levels. There is a Windows 0.7.6 and an Intel OS X binary of 0.7.2 available from the Pingus website. There is a PPC OS X binary of version 0.7.0, while version 0.7.3 contains minor bug fixes that allow the game to work better with the GNU Compiler Collection. The latest version, 0.7.6, adds additional Christmas and Halloween-themed level.

In July 2008, the game was relicensed from the GPL-2.0-or-later to the GPL-3.0-or-later.

== Reception ==
This game was the first "Game of the Month" by The Linux Game Tome. Critics were favorable toward Pingus. TechGage named Pingus among the "Top 10 Free Linux games" in 2006. CNN and PC-Welt ranked it as one of the best free games available for Linux. Thinkdigit 2009-05 ranked Pingus among the "Most addictive Linux games". Linux For You September 2009 ranked Pingus 5/5. About.com called it a great game, while acknowledging its debt to Lemmings. In a 2017 review for Windows Central, George Ponder wrote: "The graphics are good, the gameplay is challenging, and overall, Pingus has the potential of being a fun way to pass the time. It just needs a little fine-tuning here and there to make the gaming experience more fluid."

== See also ==
- List of free and open-source software packages
- List of open source games
