= AstroMenace =

2007 video game

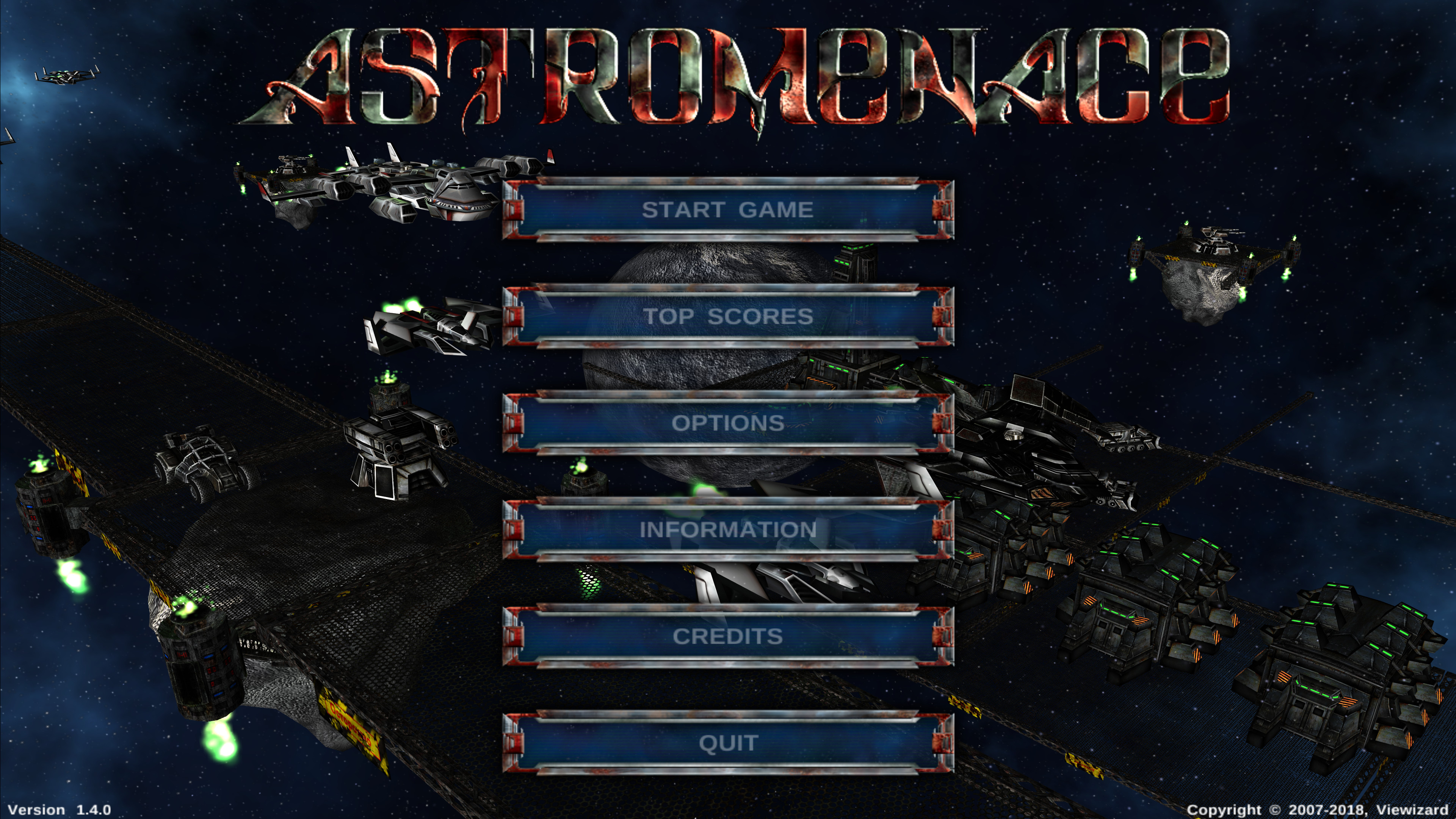
- Main menu
- Original author: Mikhail Kurinnoi
- Release: February 20, 2007; 19 years ago
- Stable release: 1.4.3 / February 9, 2025; 17 months ago
- Operating system: Windows, macOS, Linux
- Type: Scrolling shooter
- License: GPLv3 (source code); CC BY-SA 4.0 (data)
- Website: viewizard.com
- Repository: github.com/viewizard/astromenace

AstroMenace is a 3D scrolling shooter, developed and published by Russian independent game developer Viewizard.

== Gameplay ==
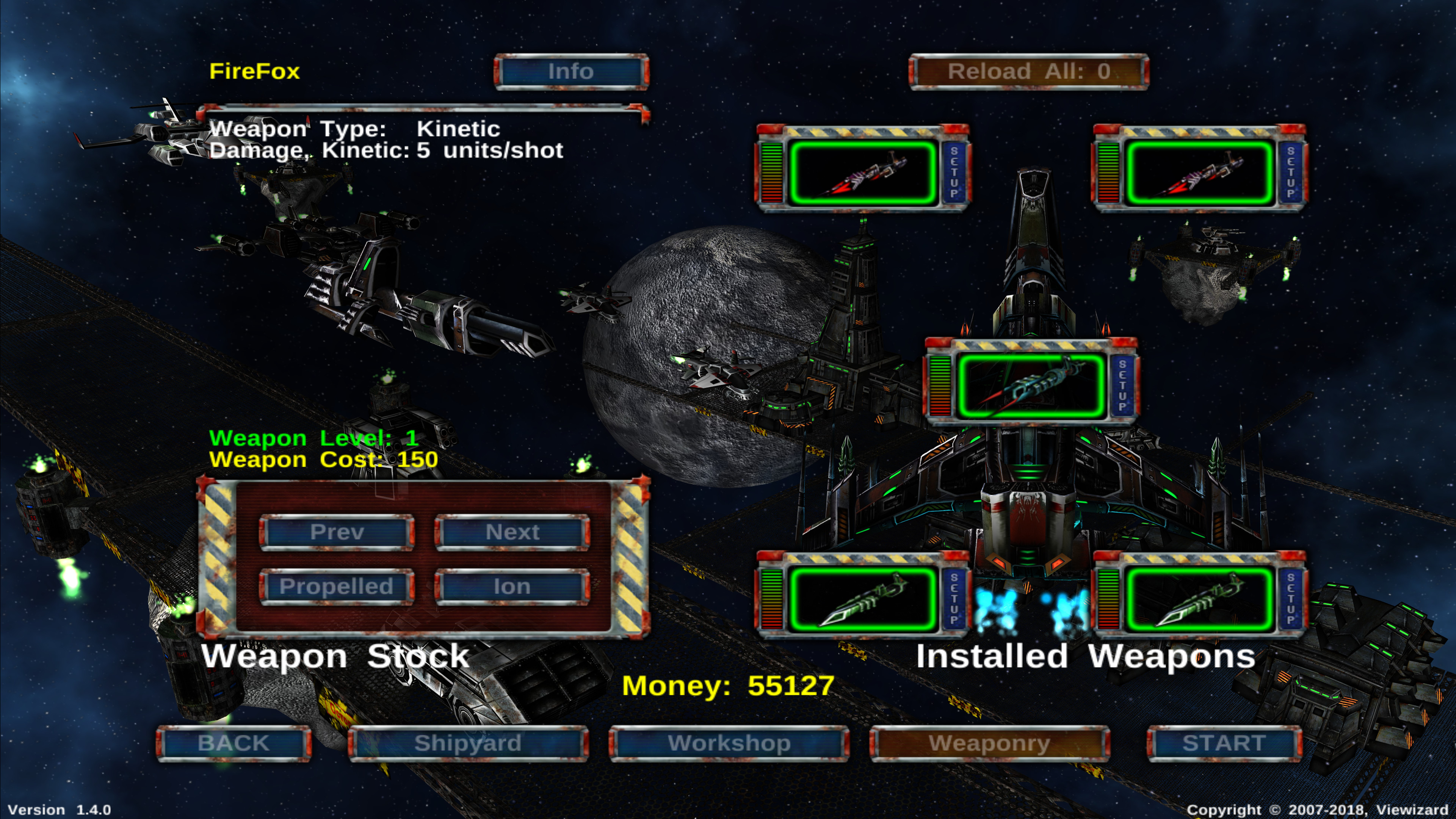
Weapon selection

The game has 13 levels, within which, money and experience points are earned by destroying enemy aliens, pirates, or meteorites. Using this money, the player can purchase from a selection of 22 ship types, 19 weapons, and 20 ship upgrades.

== Development ==
In 2006, Viewizard's developer Mikhail Kurinnoi began beta development of AstroMenace. The Windows version was offered for $14.95 as shareware early access title, having a free downloadable test version, but a Linux version was offered as donationware.

After full release in February 2007, Viewizard sold the Windows version directly from their website for $19.95.

In October 2007, version v1.2 of the game's C++ source code was released as free and open-source software under GPLv3. A fork called OpenAstroMenace was started at SourceForge.net. Some years later, Viewizard moved its own development to this fork by unifying both branches and making it the official version. Ports for other platforms were later developed, with Mac OS X and OpenPandora versions being released. In 2016 the game's content was re-released under an open content CC BY-SA 4.0 Creative Commons license. In April 2018 some artwork with sources (.3ds render files) were released under the GPLv3 in their own repository. Development continues on GitHub (as of 2025).

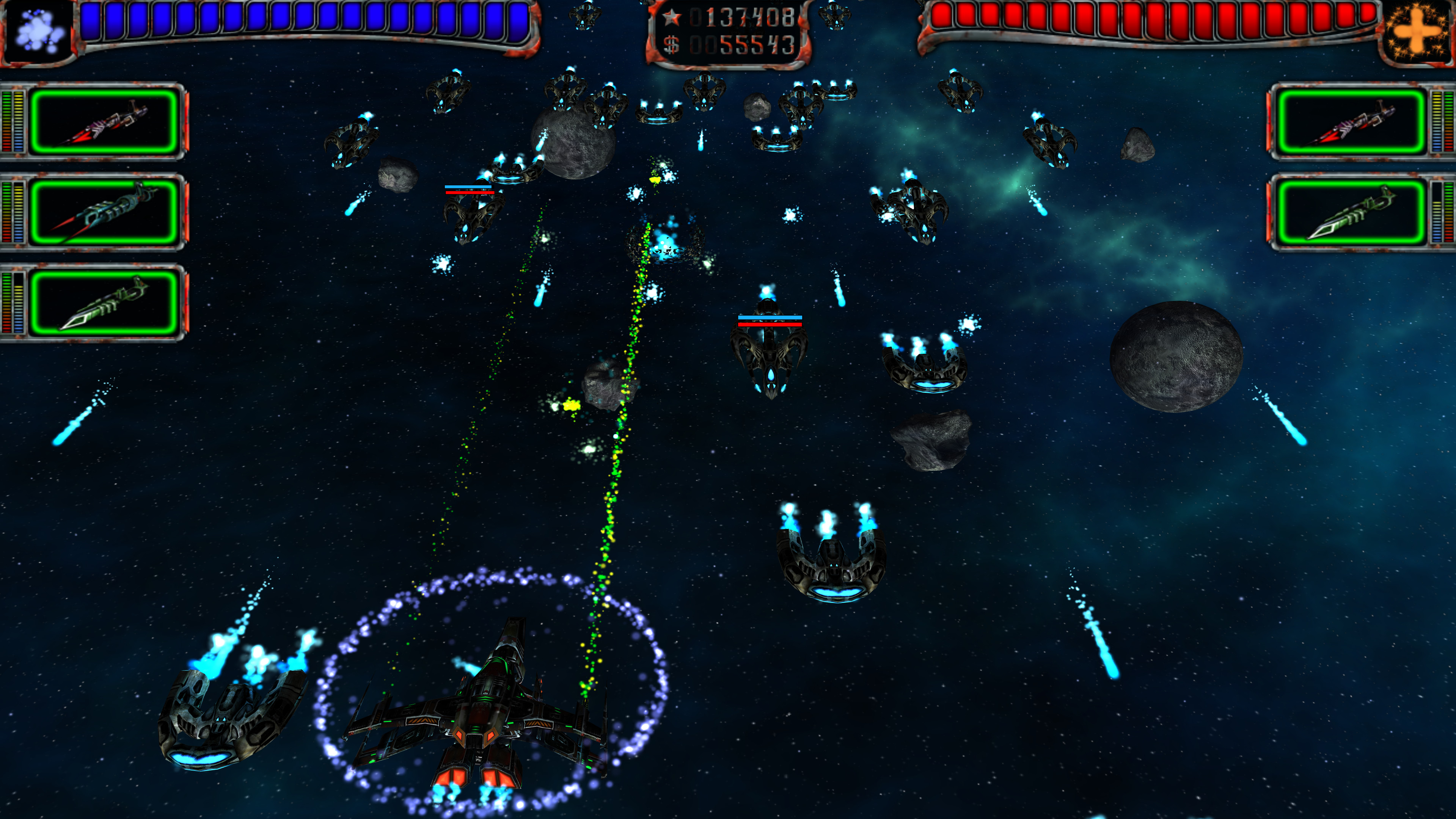
Gameplay

== Reception ==
In December 2007 the UK magazine Linux Format rated AstroMenace with 8/10 credits. In 2008 a Full Circle magazine review named Astromenace among a list of "Top 5 space games". In a 2010 Unixmen.com review, the Linux version was received favourably, with them noting that the game was "graphically unique". In 2011 Unixmen.com placed Astromenace as number one in their "19 Awesome Open Source Games for Linux" list. Linux For You ranked AstroMenace 4/5 in September 2009.

== See also ==
- List of open source games
