= Mindustry =

2017 tower defense/strategy/factory video game

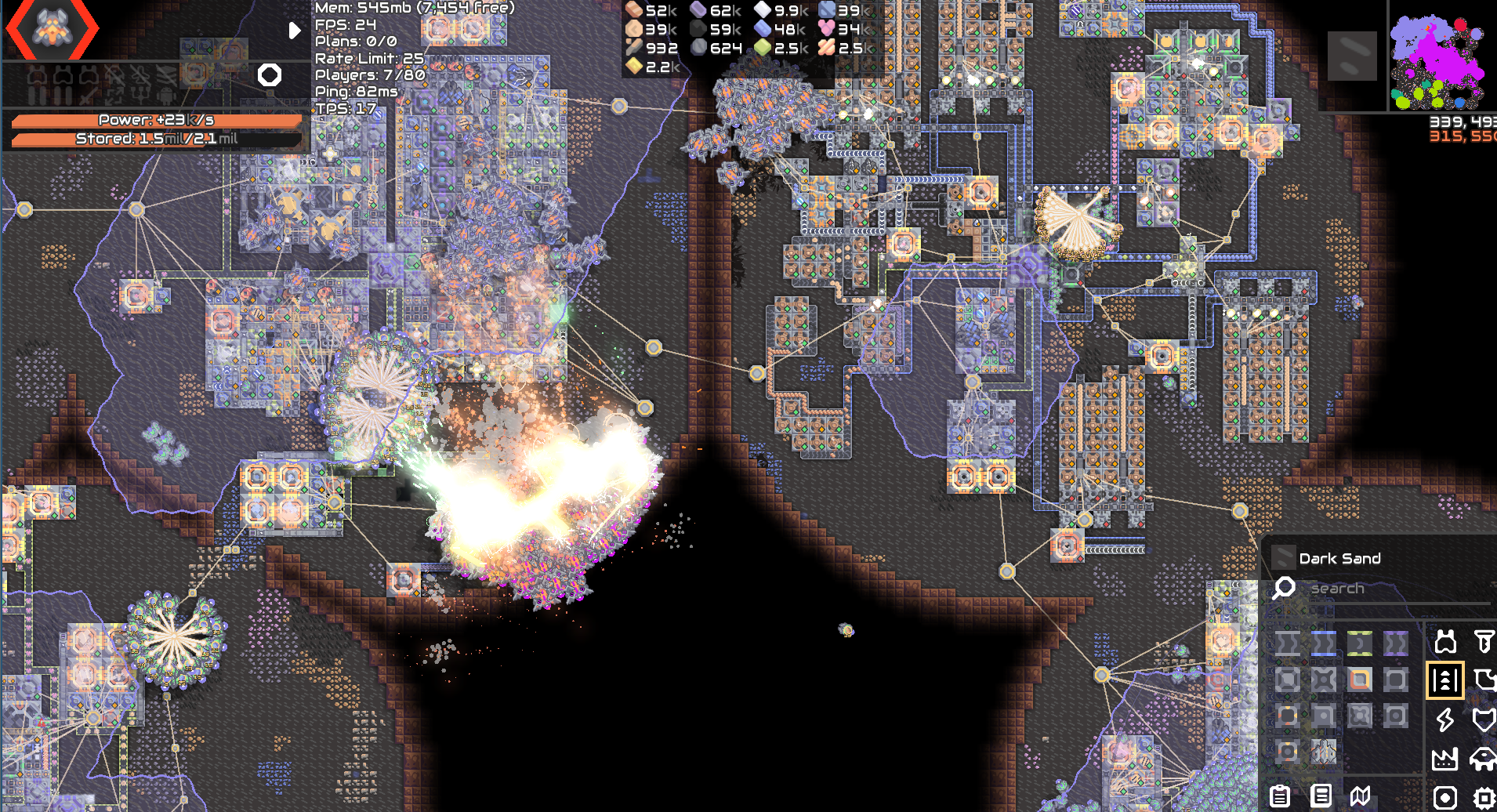
- Serpulo PvP gameplay on a "Hexed"-style map
- Developer: Anuken
- Programmer: Anuken
- Composer: Anuken
- Platforms: Windows, macOS, Linux, Android, iOS
- Release: 2017
- Genres: tower defense, 4X, real-time strategy, factory management
- Modes: Single-player, multiplayer
- License: GPLv3

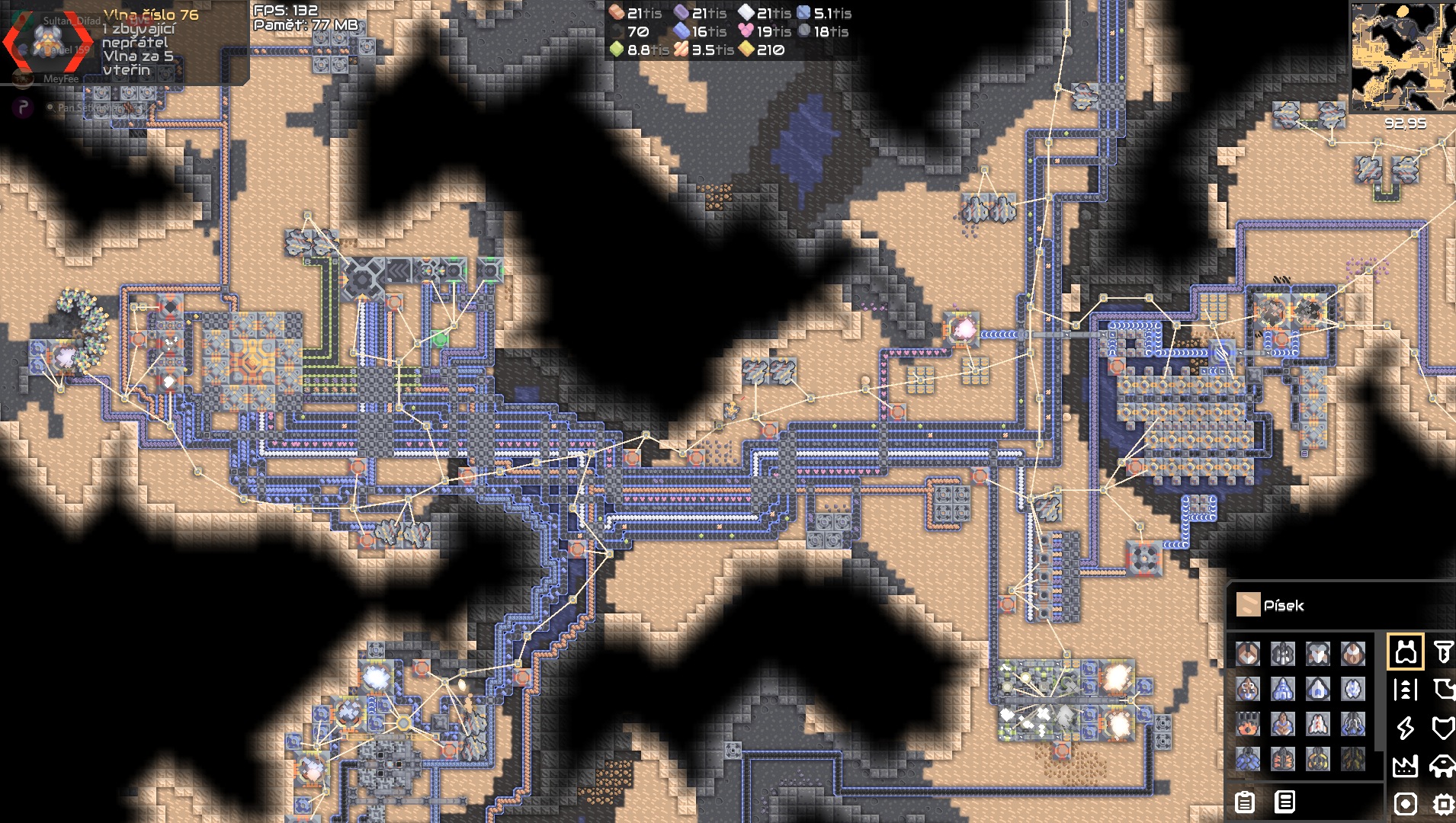
A screenshot of Mindustry gameplay in single-player campaign mode on Serpulo

Mindustry is a free and open-source real-time strategy, factory management, and tower defense game developed and published by Anuken (Note: The developer of the game officially goes by "Anuke"; however, he uses "Anuken" when "Anuke" is not available.) under the GNU General Public License v3. It is available for Windows, macOS, Linux, Android and iOS, where it can be downloaded for free from its author. It can also be bought on Steam and the Apple App Store. As an open-source game, players can mod the game and its client without restriction, and it has no advertisements or in-app purchases; development is supported by donations.

== Gameplay ==
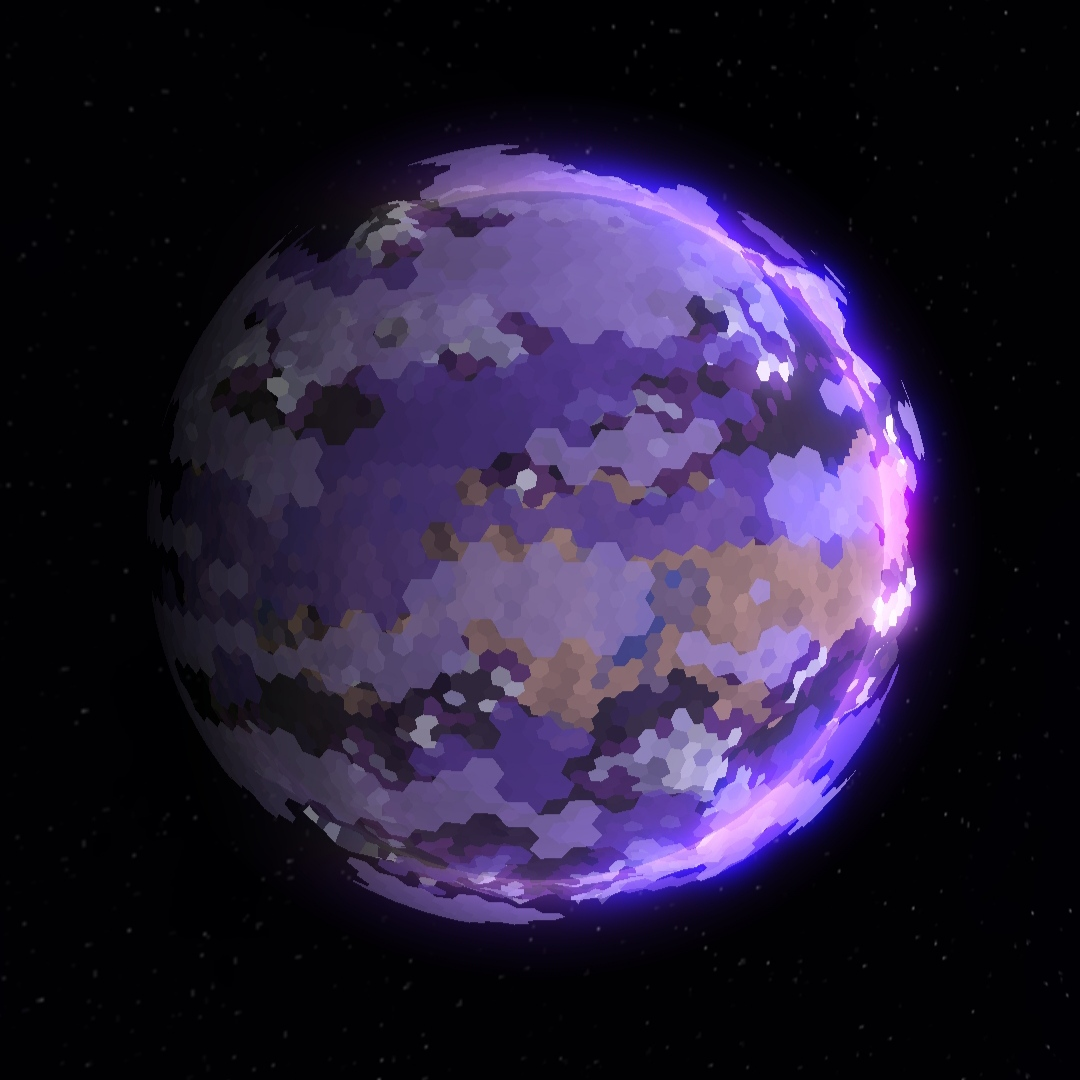
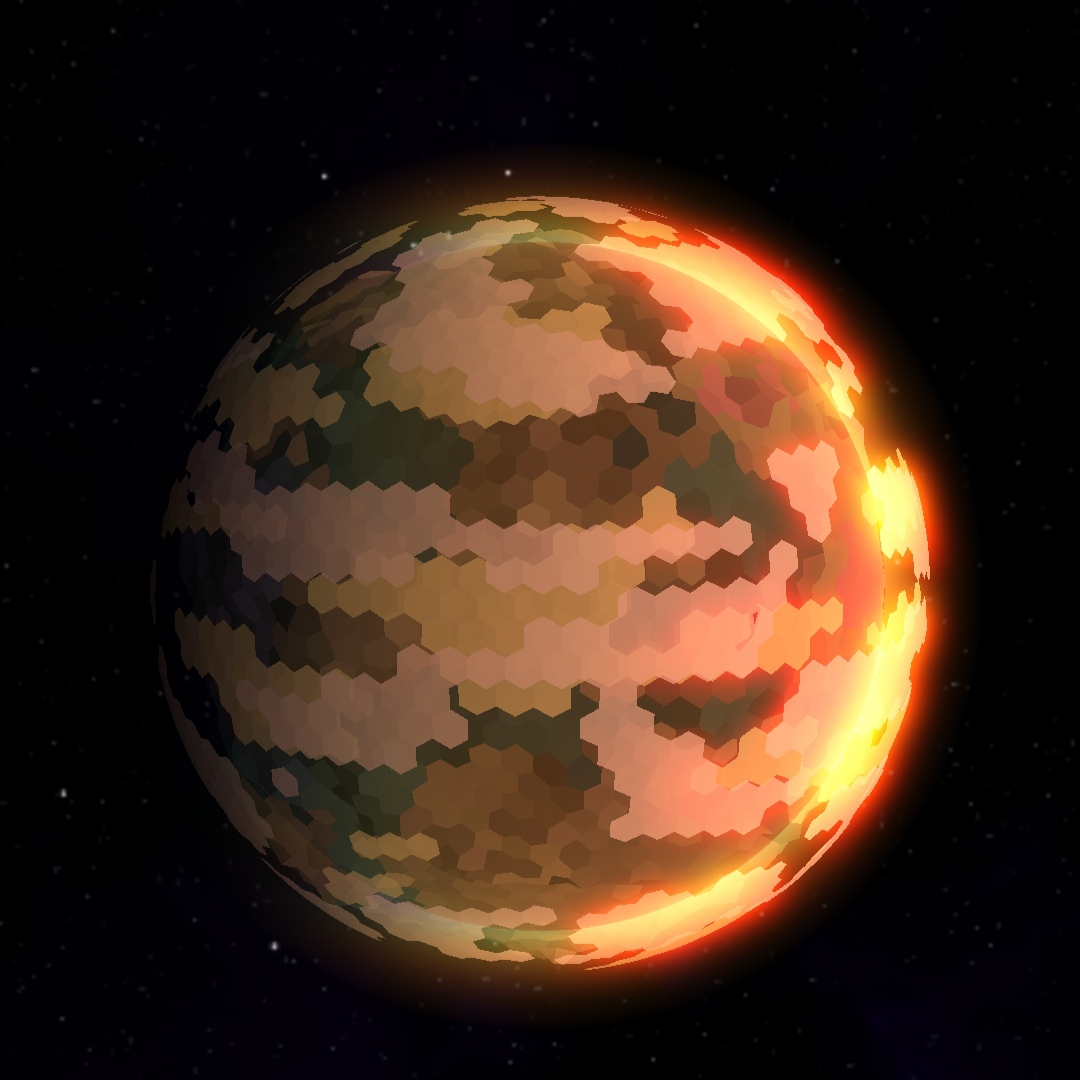
Serpulo (left) and Erekir (right), as seen in-game

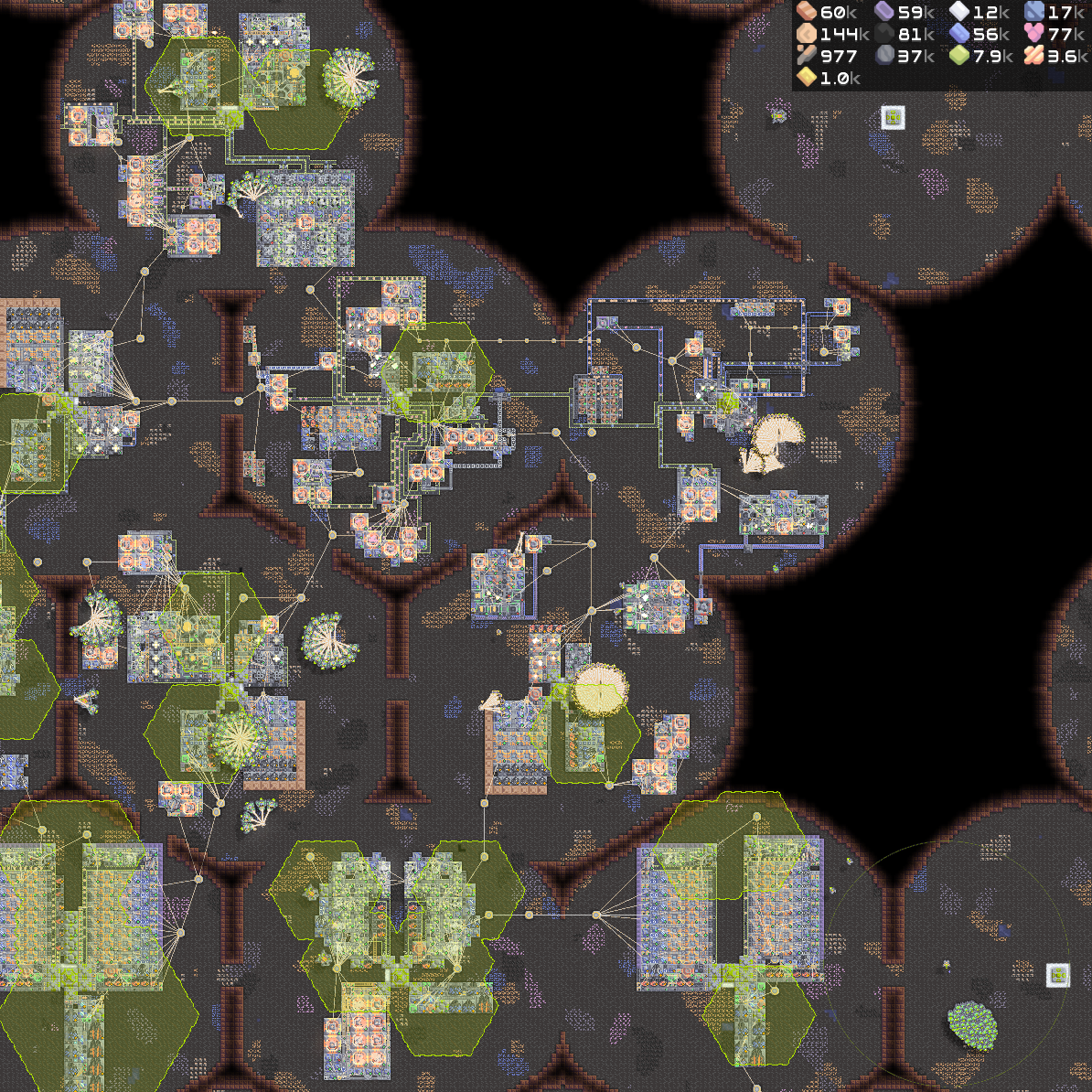
A schematic-heavy build on a "Hexed"-style Serpulo PvP map

Mindustry is a top-down two-dimensional grid-based game, in which players assume the role of a small construction ship deployed from a central structure (the "core"). The basic elements of gameplay are resource extraction, transportation and organization, manufacturing of advanced materials and processing facilities, construction and maintenance of defensive and offensive structures, production of fighting units, and research of superior technologies.

The central goal of gameplay is for the player to avoid having their core(s) destroyed. All player structures are rebuildable upon destruction (with cores needing to be built atop dedicated "Core zones" equal to or greater than the size of the core that is built), with the destruction of all active core(s) resulting in immediate loss. On "survival" maps, enemies are dispatched in waves of progressively stronger units that must be destroyed before they reach and destroy all active core(s), similar to a tower defense game, as enemy pathfinding automatically seeks out poorly-defended areas or openings to break through. In contrast, "attack" maps have (in addition to waves of units) enemy structures and core(s) which must be destroyed to win.

The game contains two planets, Serpulo and Erekir, which have different materials, structures, units and gameplay. Serpulo has 16 materials, 138 buildable blocks (including 18 defense turrets), and 35 manufacturable units (five units of each type; there are three types of ground units, two air and two naval). Erekir has 10 materials, 102 blocks (including 10 turrets), and 15 units (5 of each of tanks, mechs, and ships). On Serpulo, "logic blocks" provide an assembly-like language for controlling units and buildings. On both planets, it is possible to save and reuse "schematics", blueprints consisting of arbitrary blocks in specific arrangements.

The primary single-player game mode is the campaign, in which players are tasked with conquering a planet by capturing a sequence of regions (known as "sectors" within the game), including both "survival" and "attack" maps. After a region is captured, it can be used to build more production capabilities and export materials to other regions. Apart from the campaign, there is an editor and sandbox mode, and players are able to make custom maps.

On multiplayer servers, there are cooperative servers (in which all players share a team and attempt to defeat computer-controlled enemies), as well as team and free-for-all PvP servers.

== Release and reception ==
Mindustry was created in April 2017, for the itch.io "Metal Monstrosity" game jam, where it was ranked first among 15 entries. Its first public release (v1) was in 2017, and the first Steam release (v3) was in 2019. In 2020, v6 introduced RTS elements, described as a "huge update" that "completely overhauled" the game. In 2022, v7 added the second planet, Erekir, as well as more units for Serpulo and individually selectable RTS control for units. Originally, the next update (v8) would have reworked Neoplasm, a byproduct of the game's "Neoplasm reactors", to have been turned into another "faction", with more turrets, units, blocks, etc. Instead, the Neoplasm rework has been postponed to the next update (v9), while update v8 reworked the campaign, unit pathfinding, and multiplayer instead.

The game has been called an "impressively unique masterwork" by PC Gamer, and a "mine out of ten" by the New Indian Express. GamingOnLinux said that, while it had similarities to other factory games like Factorio, it "manages to come off quite unique" due to a greater focus on combat and micromanagement, and was "seriously fun", praising the pacing of the campaign mode as well as the multiplayer experience. MSN said that it was "a very in-depth game with a lot of stuff to it that can keep you entertained for a long time".

Reviewers have mentioned that the resource management aspects of the game can be complicated, requiring players to research the large number of turrets, and creating overwhelming "Nokia Snake level-10 type pattern"s of conveyor belts. A reviewer from Android Central said that it was "straight-up intimidating", but also that he was "absolutely smitten" with the game and that it was "wonderfully polished". Mindustry was also ranked the third best open source video games by The Gamer.

Mindustry was popular among US federal prison inmates, where it was sold for $2 USD on the inmate app store, until it was banned in July 2023 because "it was found to jeopardize the safety, security and orderly operation" of federal prisons.
