= Electronics For You =

Indian technology magazine

- Editor-in-chief: Ramesh Chopra
- Categories: Technology magazine
- Frequency: Monthly
- Total circulation: 200,000
- First issue: 1 January 1969; 57 years ago
- Company: EFY Group
- Country: India
- Based in: New Delhi, India
- Language: English
- Website: www.electronicsforu.com
- ISSN: 0013-516X

Electronics For You magazine is India's first monthly publication for electronics engineers. It was first conceptualised at IIT Madras in 1969 by Ramesh Chopra, and was published by EFY Enterprises Pvt Ltd headed by S.P Chopra and Veena Khanna.

Today, ElectronicsForU.com is the online face of Electronics For You Magazine.

The publisher of this magazine currently manages multiple magazines, annual events, and around 30 book titles. The company also provides hands-on training courses, and manufactures and markets Do-It-Yourself electronics projects and hobby kits. It has partnered with Mouser Electronics for their entire IoT series in India. The magazine has partnered with ELCINA to conduct events that recognise and award innovative technology companies. Additionally, the magazine sponsors the Electronics For You Prize, an award given to a student at IIT Madras each year.

Electronics For You magazine has a history of being collected and saved by engineers and technologists across India.
