= Blobby Volley =

2000 video game

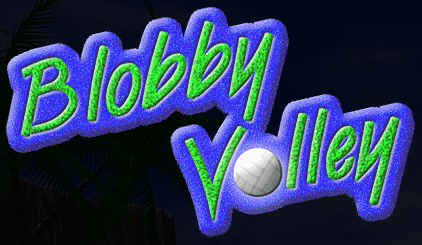
- Initial release: November 1, 2000; 25 years ago
- Stable release: 1.0 (final) / 2016; 10 years ago
- Written in: Delphi, C++, HTML5
- Operating system: Linux, macOS, Windows, FreeBSD, Android, iOS
- Platform: x86, x86-64, ARM
- Available in: Multi-language
- Type: Casual, sports
- License: GPLv2, Freeware/Donationware (PC, Browser), Commercial (mobile)
- Website: blobby.sourceforge.net

Blobby Volley is a free and open-source sports computer game series in which two blobbed shaped entities play volleyball against each other. There are multiplayer and single-player modes.

== Game rules ==
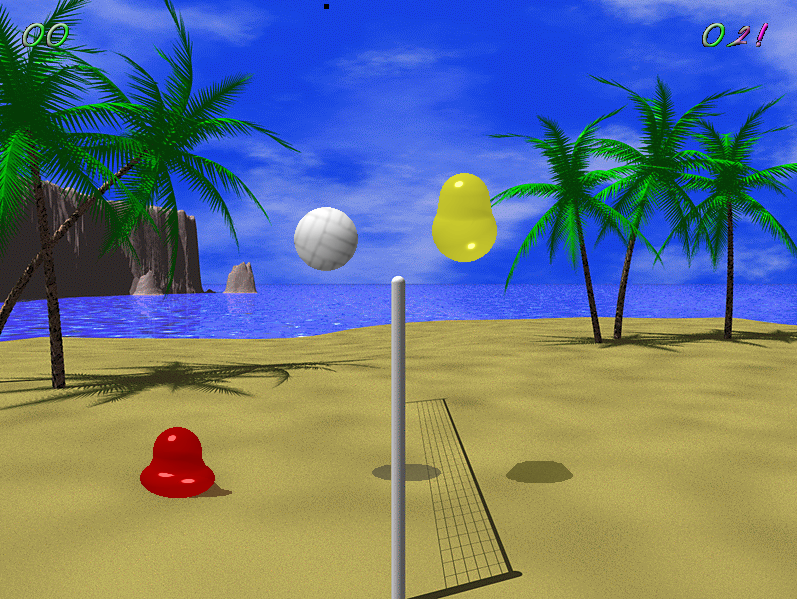
Screenshot of Blobby Volley

The rules used in Blobby Volley are derived from the standard volleyball rules. Unlike real volleyball, the movements of the players are limited to the two-dimensional space of the screen. The borders of the screen acts as an invisible wall which the ball bounces off, which is completely legal to use. Since there is only one player on each side of the field, it is permitted (unlike standard volleyball) for the player to touch the ball several times in a row.

The protagonists, blob like creatures without arms, can move left and right, jump and interacting with the ball by hitting it with their "head", therefore resembling a Header like gameplay.

The game ends when one of the two players reach 15 (or more) points and also there is a two-point lead over the other. Points may only be achieved by the player that serves the ball. Therefore, each of the players tries to make the other one commit a fault so they can serve and score points. A player can commit the following faults:

- The ball touches the ground in their own field.
- A player touches the ball more than three times in a row (the initial serve also counts as a touch).

=== Features ===
Network games are possible in Blobby Volley where the players can play against another human opponent. Locally, they can also play with another human opponent on the same system or against the AI. Blobby Volley allows players to configure keyboard and mouse controls, the colors of the blobs and the background image. The game is available in three languages (German, English and French) and also gives an insight into a history of game statistics (wins, losses).

There are community made mods available for the game. For instance Quick Game is a modification for Blobby Volley which speeds up the game and reduces the winning number of points to 10.

== History ==
Blobby Volley was originally written in Delphi by Daniel Skoraszewsky with graphics by Silvio Mummert. Version 1.0 was released in November 2000 on the authors' homepage as Freeware for PCs with Windows. Development ended around 2005 with version 1.8.

=== Blobby Volley 2 ===
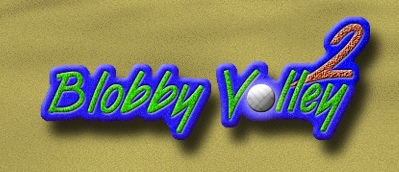
Blobby Volley 2 logo

Started in 2007 on SourceForge under the GPLv2 license, Blobby Volley 2 is the official continuation written by new programmers and based on the original assets. The continuation is programmed in C++ (gcc) instead of Delphi. This new version uses OpenGL/SDL for rendering which allows cross-platform ports for Linux, macOS, and Windows. The game is offered as freely downloadable and shareable Freeware, while also asking for donations for further development and server funding, which makes the game also donationware.

This version has several improvements over the first iteration of the series, for instance better bots, by using the Lua scripting language. There is now the ability to store multiple settings, which can be also exchange, due to a XML configuration files. A Replay functionality was added as also native Gamepad/Joystick support. It is now possible to change the game speed as also alter the default volleyball rules. There is improved network support with dedicated servers, to reduce lag.

In November 2013 a commercial Android version was released, and later in 2014 a version for iOS. In 2016 a commercial version for Windows mobile followed.

Since 2016 there is also a version of Blobby Volley 2 available for browsers which utilizes HTML5 for rendering.

== Reception ==
The Blobby Volley series became quite popular freeware game, either as single player casual game and also as competitive tournament game on LAN parties, for instance the GameCon. There is an online Sports league, running since several years organized by the community.

It is offered from many freeware download outlets, for instance it was downloaded between 2007 and May 2017 alone from SourceForge.net over 700,000 times, Chip.de counted over 1 million downloads (in May 2017). Blobby Volley was also included on several video game magazines' cover disks with freeware game compilations, for instance CD-Action 1/2007, GameStar 01/2012, or the Open Source Software CD. The game is also included in several Linux distributions, for instance Ubuntu OS.

In 2001 Gamehippo.com's staff awarded 9 of 10 points. A jeuxvideo.com retrospective described Blobby Volley as fun multiplayer game in 2009. Chip.de rated the game "very good" and called it a "fun volley ball game for one to two players". PCWorld.pl gave 4/5 points in March 2014. Linux For You September 2009 ranked Blobby Volley 3/5. Linux Format December 2014 selected Blobby Volley as "HotPick".
