= Egoboo (video game) =

1999 video game

- Developer: Egoboo Development Team
- Publisher: Ben Bishop
- Designer: Aaron Bishop
- Engine: SDL, OpenGL
- Platforms: Linux, Microsoft Windows, Mac OS X
- Release: 1999
- Genre: Action role-playing
- Modes: Single player, Multiplayer

Egoboo is a free-to-play 3D open source dungeon crawling action role-playing game with support for Windows XP, Windows Vista, Linux, Mac OS X, and some earlier versions of Windows. Egoboo has been downloaded over 590,000 times since its first release over SourceForge alone until mid 2016, while Egoboo can be downloaded from other sources as well.

== History ==
The original Egoboo was the creation of Aaron Bishop (who was at first known only as "Programmer X") and his brother, Ben Bishop in 1999. With the help of his brother Ben Bishop, he eventually released it as open source. In 2001 an alpha was released. Soon after this, however, Aaron stopped developing the project and it was abandoned. Fairly soon after this, the "Zippy Project" took over, and the game's development continued. The Zippy project eventually died as well. After this, it was taken over by Johan Jansen (alias "Zefz") and the "Resurrection" project. Currently Egoboo is being developed by the previous "Resurrection" project, which has reorganized itself as the official development team.

== Plot ==
Egoboo's story revolves around the capture of Lord Bishop, the king of Bishopia. He was taken away by the evil Dracolich for unknown reasons, and brave adventurers have risen up to try to rescue him. The Dracolich hid in the Abyss, which is only accessible through secret catacombs. The catacombs are sealed, however, and can only be unlocked by the Legendary Sporks of Yore. Players must progress through the five Palaces in order to retrieve the Sporks so that the catacombs can be opened.

== Gameplay ==
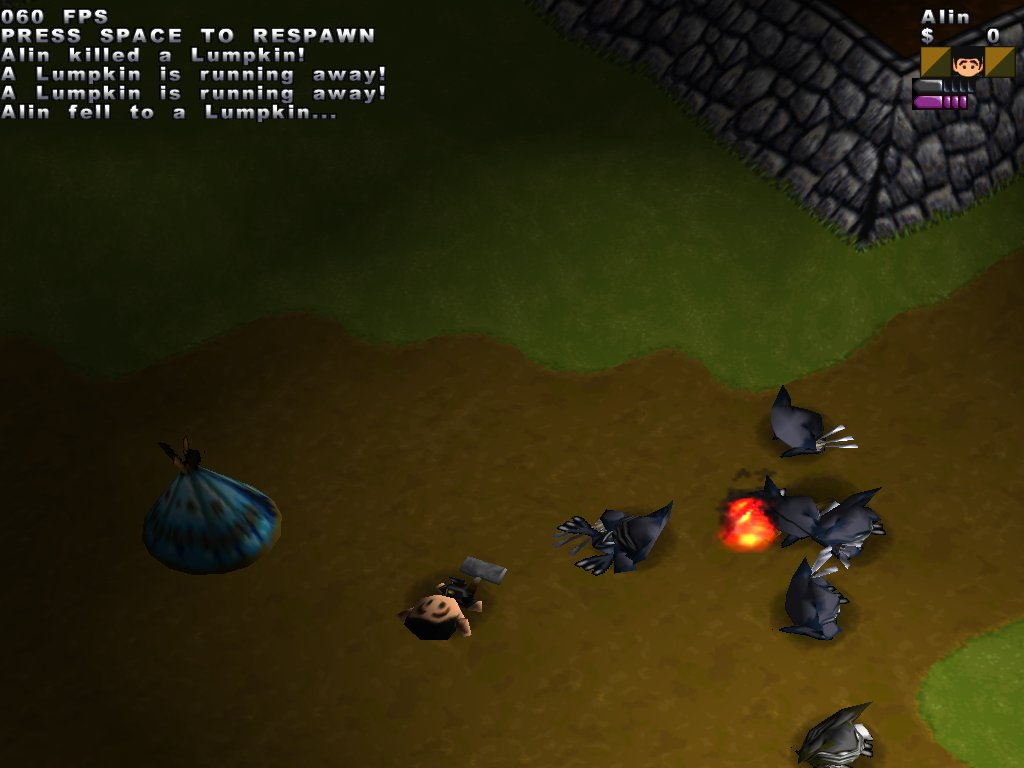
A screenshot from Egoboo

The player must progress through areas (Palace, Catacomb, Abyss) in order to proceed and finish the main storyline. The game has no world map. Instead, locations are selected from a list of available "modules" which unlock more modules when completed the previous one.

Egoboo currently features eleven playable character classes, each with its own unique abilities and skills. Each one has its own special "starter module." When the player completes a starter module, the character is saved and can enter the other areas of the game. There is no limit to how many of each class the player saves, but there is a limit to how many total characters can be displayed on the character selection screen. All of the classes but four are available at the beginning of the game. The Zombi, G'nome, Tourist and Archaeologist classes are unlocked when certain requirements are met. "Hero classes" are currently being made, which are 'level ups' of the base classes. Each hero class has advanced skills, but also some disadvantages.

Much of the game revolves around combat. There are several different types of weapons (crushing, slashing, etc.) that do different types of damage (e.g. cuts, piercings, fire, ice). Each type of weapon has its own advantages and disadvantages, and depending on the type of damage they deal, they may be more or less effective against certain monsters. In addition to normal melee (or ranged) combat, some character classes are able to use magic. Magic is divided into two types, divine and arcane. Divine magic focuses on healing. It can be used when no weapons are in the characters hand to heal nearby allies, or it can be channeled by special Relics with even more powerful effects. Arcane magic is used through books, which can create various magical effects, some more powerful than others. Most Arcane magic focuses on attacks or enchantments. All magic uses up mana, which can be restored with special potions, and also naturally regenerates.

Currently only co-operative play on a single machine is available. The developers hope to eventually add full online multiplayer support with multiple modes of play, including competitive game modes.

== Development ==
Egoboo was created by Aaron Bishop in 1999 and released as open-source software. Early development later slowed when Bishop stepped away from the project, after which members of the player community continued maintaining the codebase.

In the mid-2000s the project was revived by a new volunteer team led by Johan Jansen (“Zefz”), forming the basis of ongoing community-led development.

Since the 2010s the maintainers have focused on modernising the engine, reorganising data files, improving platform compatibility, and adding features such as an in-engine editor.

Development continues openly on GitHub, where source code, issues, and releases are maintained. Builds are distributed through the project's SourceForge page.

== Reception ==
Egoboo has achieved some popularity in the open-source gaming community, has been downloaded over 590,000 times until July 2016, and has been integrated in several linux distributions. Egoboo received reception from various game and open-source focussed news outlets over the years.

Due to the source code availability the game was ported later by other communities to new platforms as well, like the OpenPandora handheld device.
