= Solipsis =

Open-source software system

- Developers: France Télécom - R&D Division
- Stable release: 1.09 / February 18, 2009
- Operating system: Microsoft Windows, Linux, and macOS
- Type: MMORPG, Peer-to-peer
- License: LGPL
- Website: https://web.archive.org/web/20090507014736/http://happening.netofpeers.net/

Solipsis is a free and open-source system for a massively multi-participant shared virtual world designed by Joaquin Keller and Gwendal Simon at France Télécom Research and Development Labs. It aims to provide the infrastructure for a metaverse-like public virtual territory. Relying on peer-to-peer architecture, the virtual world may potentially be inhabited by a theoretically unlimited number of participants.

== Motivations ==
A central objective of Solipsis is to create a virtual world which is as independent as possible from the influence of private interests, such as server ownership. In order to achieve this, it is based around a peer-to-peer model rather than the traditional server-client one. Additionally, it aims to give users more flexibility in designing interfaces and content in their individual segments of the virtual world.

== Main principles ==
A Solipsis entity is a basic element of the virtual world. To exist, an entity should run a node that may be controlled by a navigator. Nodes are self-organized in a pure peer-to-peer network, in which relationships depend on virtual proximity. A navigator is mainly a graphical user interface, but some communication services may be added to one for interaction between entities.

The virtual world is initially empty and is only filled by entities run by end users' computers. All Solipsis nodes are functionally equal, and no preordained infrastructure is required. This eliminates as far as possible any restrictions on the content or functionality of the world.

== Current status ==
Solipsis currently consists of:

- A peer-to-peer protocol over UDP. The Solipsis protocol gives a node the ability to broadcast its presence within the virtual world. Moreover, this protocol aims to guarantee the maintenance of some global properties.
- A node-navigator interface, which takes the form of an API between the node and the navigator. Currently written in XML-RPC, this interface allows a navigator to control a node and to retrieve information on its virtual surroundings.
- A basic implementation of a Solipsis node and a Solipsis navigator licensed under the LGPL. The navigator features a two-dimensional representation of the virtual world. The design of current interface resembles YackPack, an interactive system developed by the company of the same name, by a team of engineers in Santa Rosa, led by Chief Technology Officer David Levine and envisioned by Professor BJ Fogg of Stanford University. Interaction between entities consists only of chat.
- Some other services, which implement blogs, some identity fields for social networking, file sharing, and graphical chat.

== See also ==
- Snow Crash
- OSMP
- Croquet project
- Second Life
