= Dust Racing 2D =

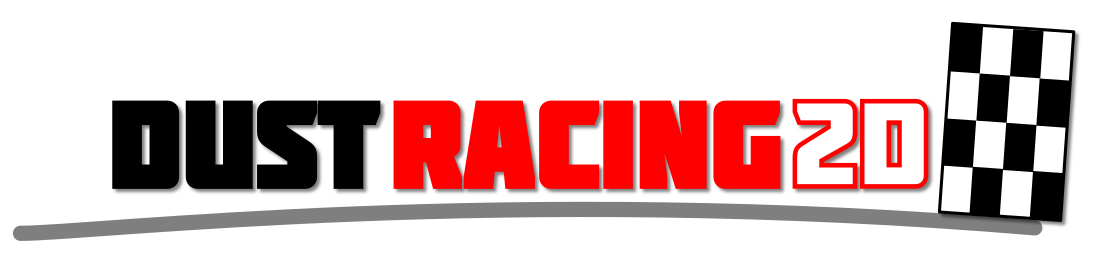
- Developer: Jussi Lind
- Publisher: Jussi Lind
- Platforms: Windows, Linux
- Release: 2012; 13 years ago
- Genre: Racing video game
- Modes: Single-player, multiplayer

Dust Racing 2D (dustrac) is an open-source, tile-based 2D racing game developed by Jussi Lind. The source code is licensed under GNU GPLv3.

== Gameplay ==
The game allows the player to race against eleven AI players on different race tracks. Finishing in the top 6 racers will unlock a new race track. Only a small portion of the race track is visible on the scrolling screen. Dust Racing 2D also includes an option for split-screen multiplayer, and a level editor that allows the creation of new race tracks.

== History ==
Dust Racing 2D was inspired by Super Cars and Slicks ’n’ Slide. The game was built by Jussi Lind on Qt development framework, and it uses OpenGL for graphics. Due to the source code availability, it is possible to port the game to multiple operating systems. The first version of the game was published in 2012. The game is under continued development as of August 2017.

== Reception ==
Dust Racing 2D was reviewed by Marius Nestor of Softpedia as being "a fun video game, especially for nostalgics who want to relive their childhood", and received 4/5 points. Senthilkumar Palani from OSTechNix praised it as a fun, interesting and challenging game with a good combination of 2D and some 3D objects. Linux Format compared it to Super Sprint though much more improved. Linux Voice emphasized the simple controls and attested for fun gameplay.
