= Kiki the nano bot =

2005 open-source puzzle video game

kiki the nano bot
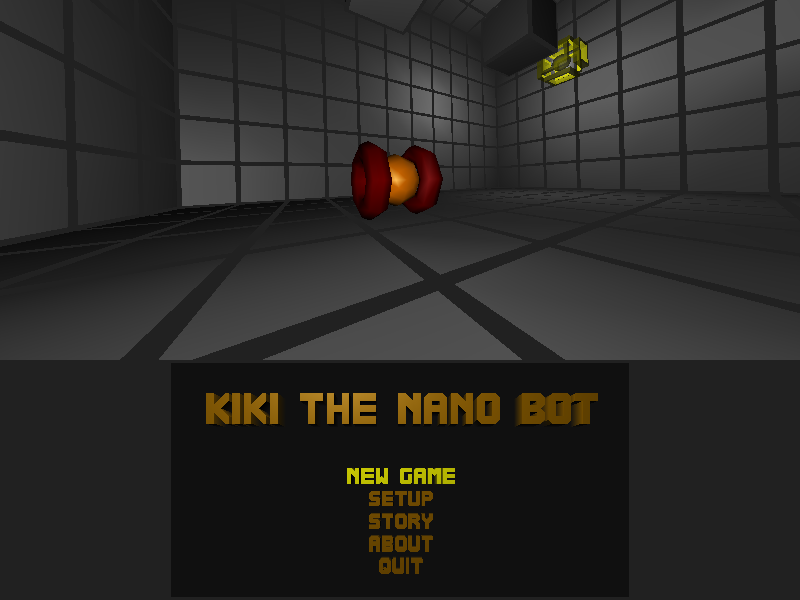
- kiki the nano bot
- Developers: Thorsten Kohnhorst (aka Monsterkodi) and others
- Stable release: 1.0.2 (Windows): 2 December 2005; 20 years ago 1.0.3 (Mac OS X): 15 February 2007; 19 years ago
- Operating system: Microsoft Windows, Mac OS X, Linux, FreeBSD
- Available in: English, Basque, German, Portuguese, Spanish, Swedish and Dutch
- License: Open source/public domain software
- Website: kiki.sourceforge.net

kiki the nano bot is an open-source puzzle video game designed by Thorsten Kohnhorst and first released in 2005. It is a mixture of the games Sokoban and Kula World. It is available for Microsoft Windows, Linux, FreeBSD and Mac OS X.

== Plot ==
The game's protagonist is a nano bot called Kiki. Kiki is the only bot left sane from a "parasitic capacity" that affected the nano world where he lived, leaving all the nano bots produced in that world "lazy stupid little robots/which shoot each other/and destroy the nano world". Kiki's task is to "repair the maker" of the nano bots.

== Gameplay ==
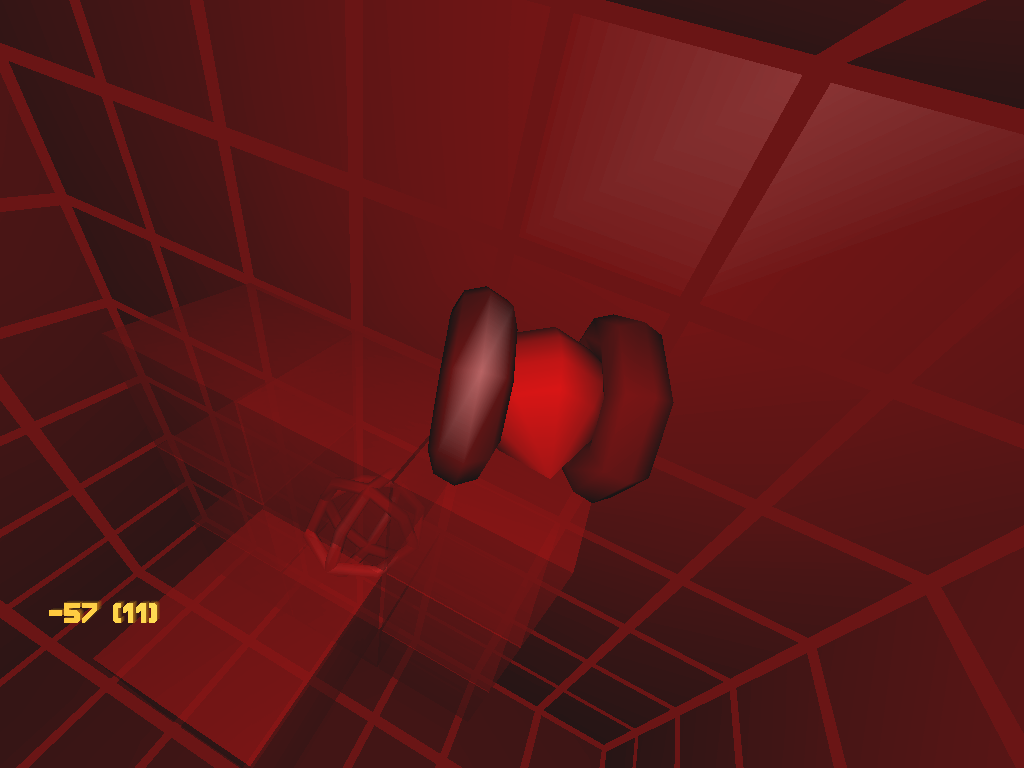
Screenshot

In each level, certain task must be performed, so the exit gate can be activated, then, if kiki moves through the activated exit gate, it will be 'beamed' to the next level. Gravity works towards the surface you were last touching and kiki can walk around the walls and on all sides of any block. The game has 50 levels, which can be viewed by selecting "Statistics", in the main menu, in which the progress of the user appears.

== Development ==
kiki the nano bot took four months of development to complete. It was designed by Thorsten Kohnhorst, who began work with such a tight deadline because he was participating in the 2002 uDevGame contest. He chose to make this during a hiatus following the dot-com bubble, allowing him to work full-time on the project. Kohnhorst took inspiration from Kula World, explaining that he liked how Kula World took advantage of all three dimensions. In order to avoid his game being a copy, he had the character move on the inside walls of a room instead of on free-floating platforms. He then dropped the run-and-jump gameplay, instead borrowing ideas from Sokoban. He kept the graphics simple due to his lack of time and skill in this area. The nano world setting of the game was chosen to complement the simple graphics.

The other nanobots in the game were originally added as a test for movement routines, but Kohnhorst felt that they added life to the game. A problem he encountered, however, was that they introduced a "level of indeterminism" to the game. To avoid removing them, he instead had it so that players needed to repair the thing making these malfunctioning machines.

== Reception ==
It won the Categories 'Best Graphics', 'Best Originality' and 'Best Overall Game' in the uDevGame Game Programming Contest 2002.

The game was downloaded between 2003 and May 2017 alone from SourceForge.net over 170,000 times. A review at acid-play.com was favourably with 4.9 of 5 points. Freeware game website Planet Free Play called in 2005 kiki the nanobot "one of the best freeware games ever.". Inside Mac Games reviewed the game favourably, recommending to give it a try "If you're in the mood for a good, challenging, puzzle game.".
