= Zaz (video game) =

2009 puzzle video game

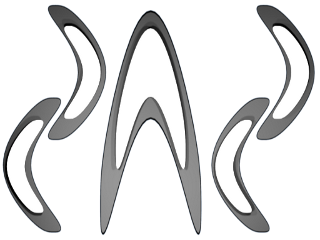

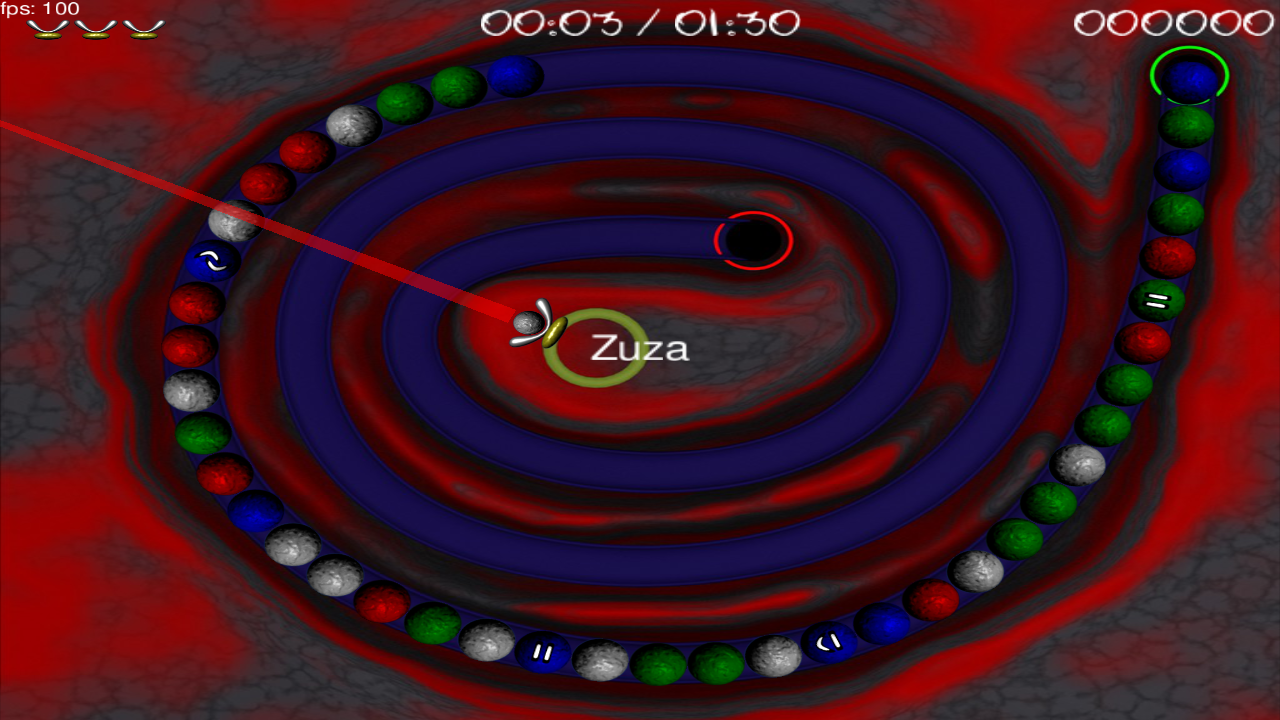
- Original author(s): Remigiusz Dybka; Kinga Dybka; Leonard Ritter
- Initial release: 0.0.1 / July 29, 2009; 16 years ago
- Stable release: 1.0 / September 3, 2010; 15 years ago
- Platform: Linux, Windows, FreeBSD, OpenBSD, Amiga
- Available in: English, Polish, Spanish (6 more)
- Type: Puzzle game
- License: GPLv3
- Website: zaz.sourceforge.net

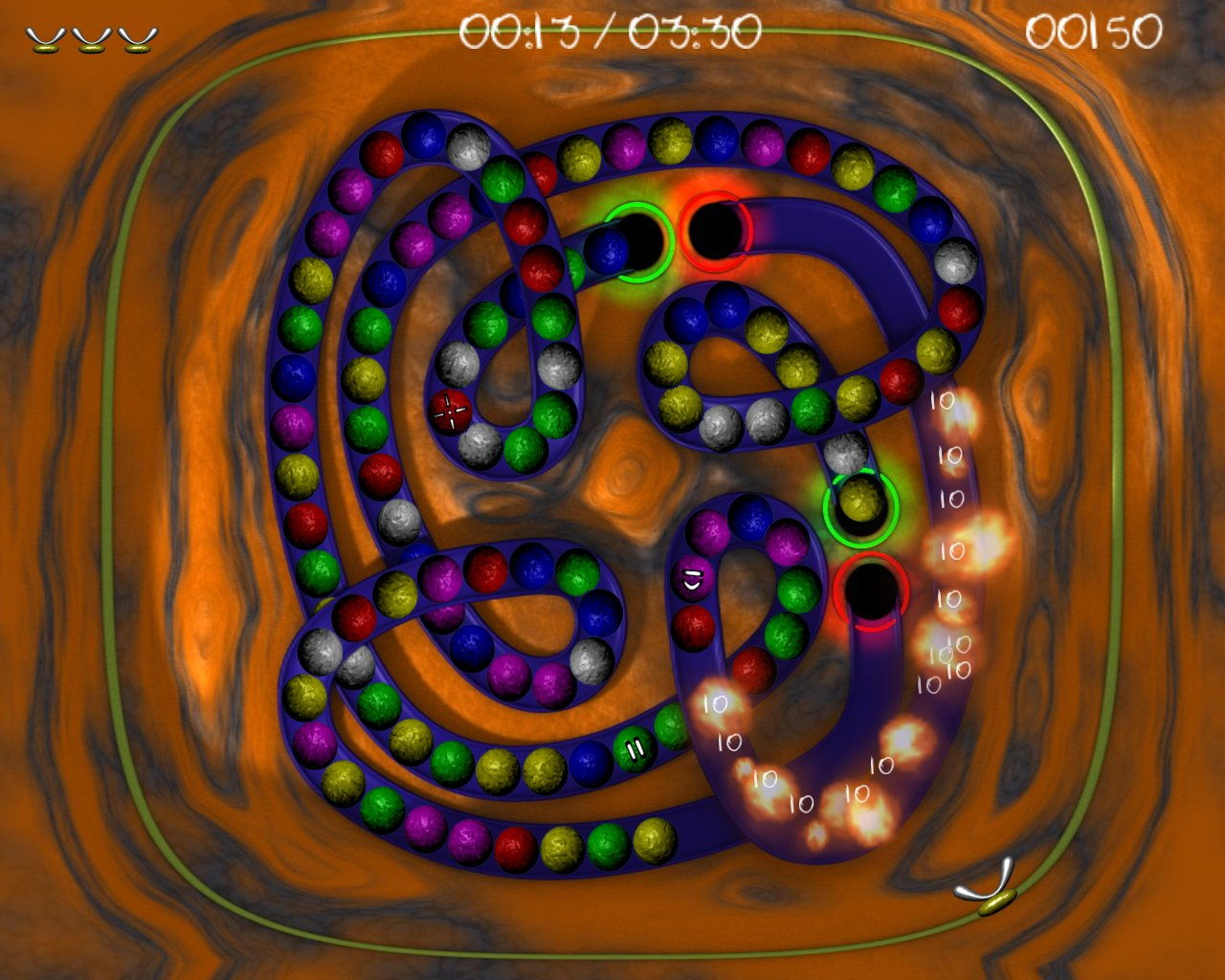
Screenshot

Zaz (a backronym for "Zaz ain't Zhit") is a free software (GPLv3) puzzle video game which is similar to Zuma.

== Gameplay ==
The goal is to remove all incoming marbles by rearranging their order and making triplets or quartets of the same color. The game features 23 levels and is reportedly harder than the original Zuma. In each of the levels there are some special items, for example marked balls that explode more than just the normal three balls.

Unlike Zuma, where the player shoots new balls from a center point, in Zaz the player moves a grabber on a separate track on the playfield to grab a ball that can then be shot back at a new location. Instead of inserting randomly assigned new balls, the player moves existing balls.

== Reception ==
Zaz is available in Linux distributions, such as Ubuntu, Fedora and Debian repositories as the game's content complies with the DFSG. This was achieved after replacing the CC BY-NC-SA licensed NIN soundtracks in versions after 0.2.6. Between 2010 and 2016 Zaz was downloaded from SourceForge directly 100,000 times. The game was positively reviewed by German computer web sites Chip.de and Computer Bild. The Chip.de review described the game as '"very well made clone of the original classical game. Zaz implements the game idea perfectly and offers challenging levels".
