= EFY Group =

Indian magazine publisher

Electronics For You (EFY)
- Company type: Private
- Industry: Publishing
- Founded: 1969
- Founder: S.P Chopra; Veena Khanna
- Headquarters: New Delhi, India
- Area served: South Asia
- Key people: S.P Chopra Chairman; Rahul Chopra MD; Ramesh Chopra Vice Chairman; Poonam Kapoor Director South
- Products: EFY Online Shop Online magazines, Print (magazine)s
- Revenue: ₨ 11,00,00,000 per annum
- Number of employees: 200
- Website: efyindia.com

EFY also known as Electronics For You, is a privately held Indian technology-oriented publishing organisation based in New Delhi. The initial publication of the EFY Group was Electronics For You, a monthly electronics magazine that was first published in 1969. The EFY Group currently manages six magazines, six web portals, five annual events, four Facebook communities, a directory, and around 30 book titles. The company also provides hands-on training courses, and manufactures and markets Do-It-Yourself electronics projects and hobby kits. Its revenue is over 11 million rupees per year. The organisation hires 200 employees, who are situated mostly in southeast Asia.

== EFY Group publications ==
Some magazines and web properties by EFY Group are:

- Electronics For You
- Open Source For You (before Linux For You)
- EFY Mag Online
- ElectronicsForU
- Electronics Industry Directory
- Electronics For You Business

== EFY training and events ==
EFY also conducts a set of major events on a regular basis, targeting design engineers, developers, technologists, and technical decision makers. The biggest in India among these is India Electronics Week (IEW), under which come Electronics Rocks as well as the IoTShow, Embedded India events. These events also have short-term technical courses that are designed to provide students with practical hands-on training.
