= List of free multiplayer online games =

This is a selected list of multiplayer online games which are free to play in some form without ever requiring a subscription or other payment. Some common types are first-person shooters or multiplayer online battle arena, but could be of any genre.

== Free and open-source ==
These MOGs run on a non-profit basis, requiring no payment from the players.

	Developer(s)	Release date	Required OS	Genre	Payment	Synopsis	Type
0 A.D.	Wildfire Games	April 1, 2010	Windows, OS X, Linux, BSD	Real-time strategy	Free to Play	historical war and economy game	3D
Alien Arena	Free Software community	October 2004	Windows, OS X, Linux, BSD	first-person shooter	Free to play	1950s-era sci-fi shooter	3D
AssaultCube	Free Software community	November 21, 2008	Windows, OS X, Linux, Android	Tactical first-person shooter	Free to play	fast paced shooter with special movements	3D
Allegiance	Microsoft Research	March 16, 2000	Windows	Space simulation, RTS	Free to play	Players control space fighter ships, and fight for various factions.	3D
C-Dogs SDL	Free Software community	Jul 25, 2013	Windows, OS X, Linux	Shoot 'em up	Free to play	features both co-op and deathmatch	3D
Cube	Free Software community	2001	Windows, Linux, FreeBSD, OS X, AmigaOS 4, AROS, iPhone, Wii, Pocket PC	first-person shooter	Free to play	multiplayer shooter with multiple game modes	3D
Cube 2: Sauerbraten	Free Software community	May 6, 2004	Windows, Linux, BSD, OS X	first-person shooter	Free to play	shooter with real-time editing	3D
Fantasy Masters	Zeonix	January 2003	Windows	Collectible card game	Free to play	Network trading card game. Play with other users with your 50 card deck.	2D
Freeciv	Free Software community	January 5, 1996	Linux	Turn-based strategy	Free to play	Build, explore and conquer.	2D
Globulation 2	Free Software community	2 February 2009	Windows, OS X, Linux	Real-time strategy	Free to play	Aims to reduce micromanagement	2D
OpenArena	Free Software community	August 19, 2005	Windows, OS X, Linux	First-person shooter	Free to Play	Open source quake 3 clone.	3D
OpenClonk	Free Software community	3 December 2010	Windows, OS X, Linux	action game	Free to Play	mining, settling and PvP combat	2D
OpenTTD	Free Software community	6 March 2004	Windows, OS X, Linux	Business simulation game	Free to Play	logistics simulator with construction elements	2D
OpenRA	Free Software community	April 13, 2010	Windows, OS X, Linux	Real-time strategy	Free to Play	Command & Conquer reimplementation with gameplay modernisation	2D
PokerTH	Free Software community	October 2006	Windows, OS X, Linux, Maemo, Android	Card game	Free to Play	Texas hold 'em simulator	2D
TetriNET	Free Software community	1997	Windows, Linux, MacOS, BeOS	Puzzle video game	Free to Play	multiplayer online Tetris	2D
Liquid War	Free Software community	1995	Windows, OS X, Linux	action game	Free to play	Based on particle flow dynamics	2D
MegaGlest	Free Software community	January 6, 2010	Windows, OS X, Linux	Real-time strategy	Free to play	Fantasy strategy game with magic and steampunk elements	3D
Luanti	Free Software community	November 2, 2010	Windows, OS X, Linux, Android	Sandbox game	Free to play	Survival game with voxel view similar to Minecraft	3D
Red Eclipse	Free Software community	March 15, 2011	Windows, OS X, Linux, Android	first-person shooter	Free to play	science-fiction shooter with parkour movements	3D
Smokin' Guns	Free Software community	June 8, 2012	Windows, OS X, Linux	first-person shooter	Free to play	western themed	3D
SubSpace	Virgin Interactive	November 30, 1997	Windows	Action game	Free to play	2D space shooting	2D
SuperTuxKart	Free Software community	6 August 2007	Windows, OS X, Linux, Android, iOS, Switch	Racing game	Free to play	arcade kart racing game	3D
The Battle for Wesnoth	Free Software community	October 2, 2005	Windows, OS X, Linux	Turn-based strategy	Free to play	hex cell based strategy with high fantasy theme	2D
Teeworlds	Free Software community	May 27, 2007	Windows, OS X, Linux	Platform, Action	Free to play	2D Action Platformer with a grappling hook. Wide variety of community created maps and game-modes.	2D
Urban Terror	Free Software community	August 5, 2000	Windows, OS X, Linux	First-person shooter	Free to Play	Open source stand alone game based on a quake 3 mod.	3D
Unvanquished	Free Software community	February 29, 2012	Windows, OS X, Linux	first-person shooter, real-time strategy	Free to Play	sci-fi themed team game	2D
Warzone 2100	Pumpkin Studios, Free Software community	April 10, 1999	Windows, OS X, Linux	real-time strategy and real-time tactics	Free to Play	post-apocalyptic, military-science-fiction setting	3D
Widelands	Free Software community	22 February 2014	Windows, OS X, Linux	Real-time strategy	Free to Play	construction game with indirect controls	2D
World of Padman	Free Software community	April 1, 2007	Windows, OS X, Linux, AmigaOS 4	First-person shooter	Free to Play	based on a video game cartoon series	2D
Xonotic	Free Software community	December 23, 2010	Windows, OS X, Linux	First-person shooter	Free to Play	Fast-paced open-source FPS.	3D
Zero-K	Free Software community	October 1, 2010	Windows, OS X, Linux	Real-time strategy	Free to Play	similar gameplay to Total Annihilation	3D

== Free to play ==
These MOGs run on a for-profit basis, and do not require money from the player for an in-game advantage over other players.

	Developer(s)	Release date	Required OS	Genre	Payment	Synopsis	Type
Apex Legends	Respawn Entertainment	2019	Windows, PlayStation 4, Xbox One	Battle royale	Free to play	Apex Legends fuses elements of a variety of video games, including Respawn's own Titanfall series, battle royale games, and class-based shooters.	3D
Battlefield Heroes	EA Games	2009	Windows	First-person shooter	Free to play, with the option to purchase accessories such as guns, clothes, widgets etc.	Cartoon simulation game of WWII where players can choose to fight as a soldier for one of two factions, Royal or National, and fight for victory.	3D
Battlerite	Stunlock Studios	2017	Windows	MOBA	Free to play	Battlerite consists of two teams battling against each other. Each player chooses a unique playable character called a Champion with unique offensive, defensive, and movement abilities.	3D
Brawlhalla	Blue Mammoth Games	2017	Windows, PlayStation 4, Xbox One, Nintendo Switch, iOS, Android	Fighting	Free to play	A platform fighter for up to 8 players with the goal to knock one's opponent off the stage	2D
Bloodline Champions	Stunlock Studios	2011	Windows	MOBA	Free to play, with option to unlock more cosmetic items and usable characters.	Arena-based PvP game where teams of 2–5 battle in three different game modes; team deathmatch, capture the flag and map point control.	3D
Call of Duty: Warzone	Infinity Ward, Raven Software	2020	Windows, PlayStation 4, Xbox One	Battle royale	Free to play	The title is a part of the 2019 video game Call of Duty: Modern Warfare but does not require the purchase of it.	3D
Company of Heroes Online	THQ	2010–2011	Windows, macOS, iPadOS, iOS, Android	Real-time strategy	Free to play, with option to purchase convenience items	Action WWII game where players quickly build a force to gain control of the map in 1v1 through 4v4 games in multiplayer or play alone.	3D
Counter-Strike 2	Valve	2012	Windows	First-person shooter	Free to play, with cosmetics that can be obtained through a case by chance	A team-based shooter that has an in game economic system to purchase weapons and grenades in a 5v5.	3D
Destiny 2	Bungie	2017	Windows, PlayStation 4, Xbox One, Stadia, PlayStation 5, Xbox Series X/S	First-person shooter	Free to Play	A game that incorporates role-playing and massively multiplayer online game (MMO) elements.	3D
Dota 2	Valve	2013	Windows, macOS, Linux	MOBA	Free to play, with various cosmetic customization options available for purchase. Every single hero can be freely chosen in All-Pick mode.	Players control different heroes in a 5 vs 5 battle to control lanes.	3D
Fortnite Battle Royale	Epic Games	2017	Windows, macOS, PlayStation 4, Xbox One, iOS, Nintendo Switch, Android, Xbox Series X/S, PlayStation 5	Battle royale	Free to play	100 players skydive onto an island and scavenge for gear to defend themselves from other players; the last player or team alive wins the match.	3D
Guns and Robots	Masthead Studios	2013	Windows	Third-person shooter	Free to play, with the option to purchase additional content	Comic-style, robot creation, online shooter	3D
Heroes of Newerth	S2 Games	2010	Windows	MOBA	Free to Play	One of the spiritual successors to the Warcraft III mod Defense of the Ancients (DotA)	3D
Heroes of the Storm	Blizzard Entertainment	2015	Windows, macOS	MOBA	Free to play, with options to purchase cosmetics and permanently unlock playable heroes	The game features various characters from Blizzard's franchises as playable heroes, as well as different battlegrounds based on Warcraft, Diablo, StarCraft, and Overwatch universes.	3D
League of Legends	Riot Games	2009	Windows, macOS	MOBA	Free to play, with options to purchase cosmetics and unlock additional heroes with premium currency in addition to ingame currency	Players control different heroes in a 5 vs 5 battle to control lanes	3D
Paladins	Hi-Rez Studios	2018	Windows, PlayStation 4, Xbox One	First-person shooter	Free to play	Hero shooter video game	3D
Rec Room	Against Gravity	2016	Windows, PlayStation 4	First-person shooter, Action RPG, Sports	Free to play	Social VR game including multiple game experiences, including FPS, action RPG, and sports	3D
Rogue Company	First Watch Games	2020	Windows, PlayStation 4, Nintendo Switch, Xbox One, Xbox Series X/S, PlayStation 5	First-person shooter	Free to play	Hero shooter video game	3D
Smite	Hi-Rez Studios	2014	Windows, macOS, PlayStation 4, Xbox One, Nintendo Switch, Amazon Luna	MOBA	Free to play	Players control a god, goddess, or other mythological figure, and take part in team-based combat	3D
Snake.io	Kooapps	2016	Windows, macOS	Battle royale	Free to play	Players control a snake that grows longer by consuming glowing pellets scattered throughout the game arena	3D
Team Fortress 2	Valve	2007	Windows, macOS, Linux	First-person shooter	Free-to-play in perpetuity from June 2011, with some cosmetic in-game items available for purchase on a microtransaction basis.	Cartoon-style first person shooter where two opposing but functionally identical factions battle for control of maps	3D
Transformice	Atelier 801	2010	Windows, macOS, Linux	MMO, Platform	Free-to-play	Collect cheese playing as a mouse and take it back to the hole.	2D
Valorant	Riot Games	2020	Windows	First-person shooter	Free to play	A team-based tactical shooter in which player characters have unique abilities and use an economic system to purchase their abilities and weapons	3D
Warframe	Digital Extremes	2013	Windows	Third-person shooter	Free to play	A cooperative action role-playing third-person shooter	3D
Roblox	Roblox Corporation	2007	Windows, macOS, Linux, ChromeOS, Xbox One	Platform	Free to play, items and boosts available for purchase.	A game engine/platform where users can build their own creations.	3D
Straftat	Lemaitre Bros	2024	Windows, Linux, MacOS	First-person shooter	Free to Play	An arena shooter where people collect weapons around the map to fight.	3D

== See also ==
- List of massively multiplayer online games
- List of free massively multiplayer online games
- List of MMORPGs
- List of multiplayer browser games
- Browser game
