= Planeshift =

Planeshift may refer to:

- Planeshift (Magic: The Gathering), an expansion set for Magic: The Gathering
- PlaneShift (video game), a free to play massively multiplayer online role playing game
