= SuperTux =

Free and open-source 2D platform game

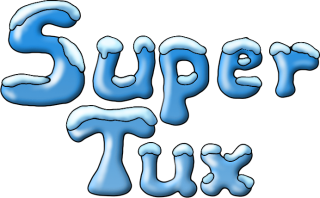

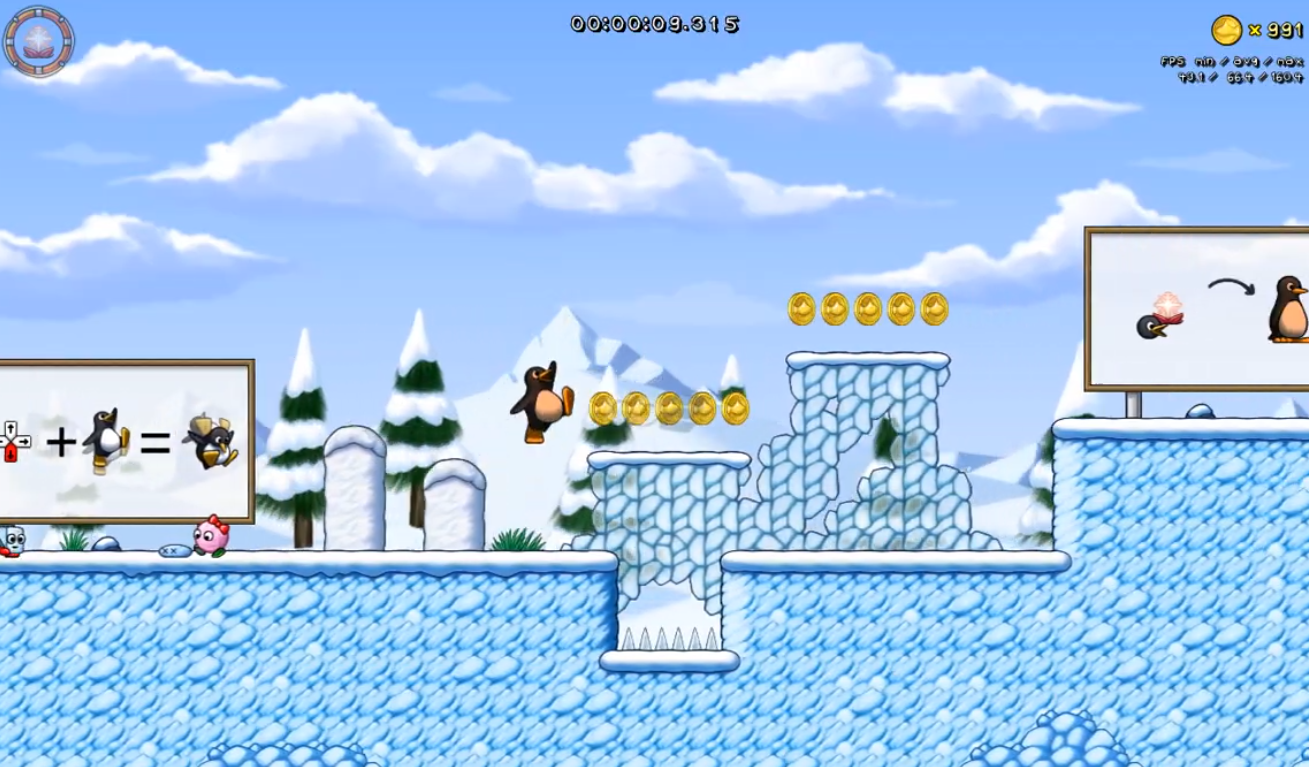
- Original authors: Bill Kendrick (code); Ingo Ruhnke (art)
- Developers: Supertux development team with Tobias "Tobbi" Markus, Carsten "RustyBox" Wirtz and others
- Release: 0.1.1 / May 11, 2004; 22 years ago

Stable release(s)
- 0.7.0 / 15 March 2026
- Written in: C++, Squirrel
- Platform: Linux, Mac OS X, Microsoft Windows, Wii (homebrew, ported), Wii U (homebrew, running in vWii mode, ported), Nintendo 3DS (Homebrew port), Nintendo Switch (Homebrew port),Wiz, Pandora, BlackBerry, TI-Nspire, Android, Ubuntu Touch, Steam
- Available in: English, Spanish, German, French, Japanese, Arabic, and Norwegian Bokmål.
- Type: Single-player platformer
- License: GPLv3
- Website: supertux.org
- Repository: github.com/SuperTux/supertux

SuperTux is a free and open-source 2D side scrolling platform video game inspired by Nintendo's Super Mario Bros. series. Players control Tux, the mascot of the Linux kernel, through a variety of levels and worlds to rescue his girlfriend, Penny, from the evil Nolok. Originally developed for Linux operating systems, the game has since been ported to Windows, Mac OSX, Steam, and other platforms.

== Synopsis ==
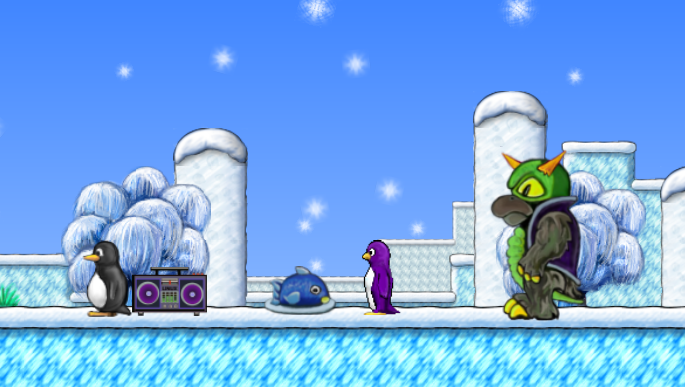
Tux, Penny, and Nolok

The game starts with Tux and Penny on a picnic. While Tux is distracted showing Penny his dance moves, Nolok kidnaps her and takes her to his castle. Tux must make his way through several worlds and beat a boss at the end of each world to save her.

== Gameplay ==
Speedrun of a SuperTux level

Gameplay in SuperTux is similar to Super Mario Bros. Tux can jump beneath bonus blocks marked with question marks to obtain coins or power-ups, such as the egg, which increases his size and allows him to withstand one additional hit. Bonus blocks may also contain items including trampolines and temporary invincibility stars. Enemies can be defeated by jumping on them, while most enemies can additionally be defeated or frozen by projectiles obtained after collecting a fire flower or an ice flower. Earth flowers equip Tux with a miner's helmet that provides a spotlight in dark areas and grants brief invincibility, whereas air flowers allow Tux to glide, jump higher, and move more quickly. When Tux is hit while empowered by a flower, he loses the upgrade and reverts to his larger form. The goal of each level is to reach the endpoint, which is typically marked by a set of checker-patterned poles.

Each world concludes with a boss encounter, such as the Yeti at the end of "Icy Island", the game's first world, or the Ghosttree in the Forest World.

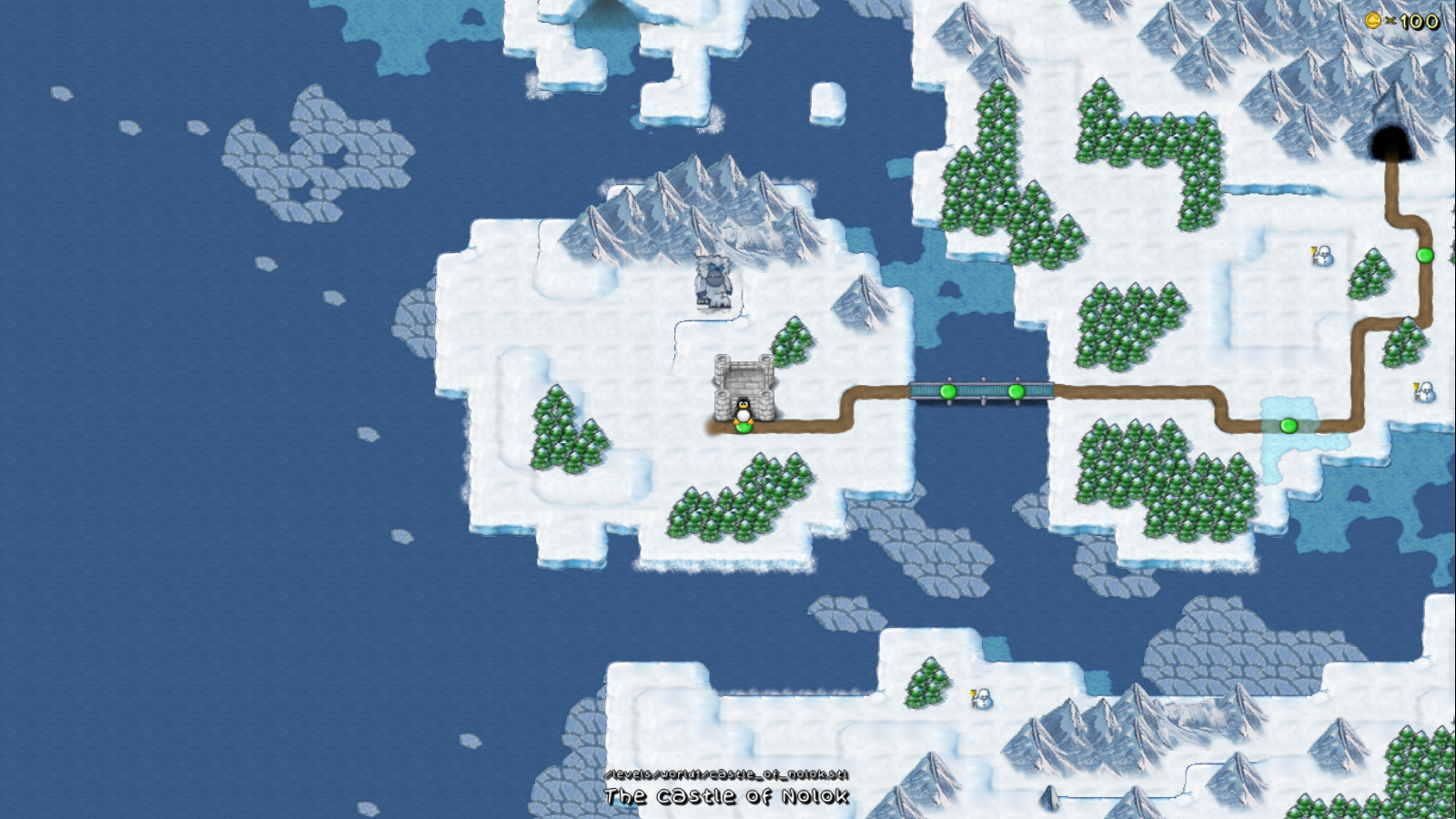
At the end of "Icy Island", the first world in the game, the Yeti boss awaits Tux.

In addition to the two primary worlds, the game includes contributed levels such as the four Bonus Islands, seasonal level sets for Christmas and Halloween, and a retro-themed level set titled Revenge in Redmond, which was created to commemorate the game's 20th anniversary in 2020. Further content, such as user-created levels built in the internal level editor and content like custom music and tilesets, are available online and in the game's Add-On Manager.

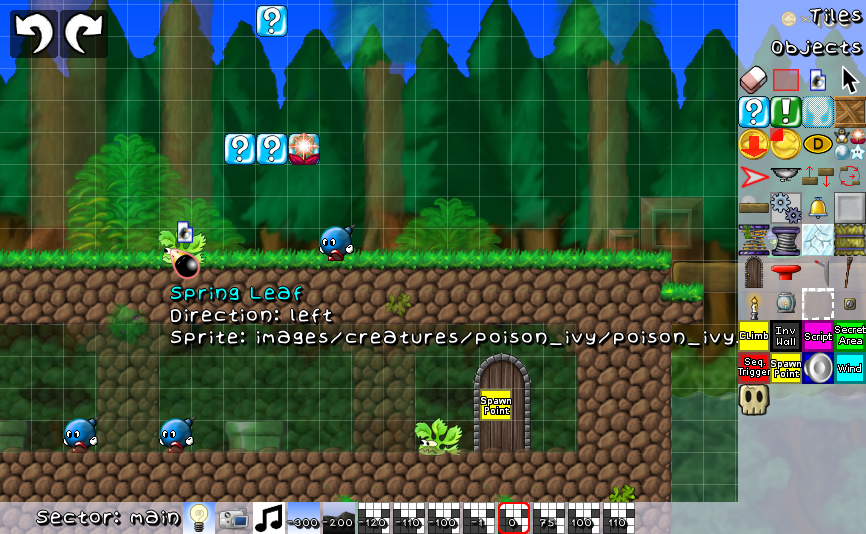
Level editor in 0.6.2

== Development and History ==
SuperTux began development in 2003 as an open-source platform game inspired by the early Super Mario Bros. titles. The project was initiated by a small group of developers seeking to create a free and cross-platform alternative using the Simple DirectMedia Layer (SDL) library. Over time, the game evolved through contributions from a broad community of volunteer programmers, artists, and level designers, with development coordinated primarily through public version-control repositories and community forums.

Early releases focused on establishing the core platforming mechanics and graphical style. The first Milestone release was version 0.1.0, released on May 3, 2004. Milestone 1 introduced a completely new set of original graphics, the basic gameplay framework, new enemies, and the first official Windows and Mac OS X ports. Subsequent releases also added new enemies, power-ups, and environmental themes. Another significant milestone came out on December 17, 2006 with version 0.3.0, also known as Milestone 1.9. Milestone 1.9 was a preview release of Milestone 2 and marked the beginning of a transition to a more modern engine architecture, improved physics, and expanded level scripting capabilities. The later 0.4.x and 0.5.x series continued refining the engine, updating artwork, and enhancing compatibility with contemporary operating systems.

Version 0.6.0, released in 2019, provided substantial graphical and technical upgrades, including new animations, improved lighting effects, and major revisions to many levels. The update also integrated an enhanced in-game level editor, enabling players to create and share custom levels more easily. Subsequent minor releases have focused on stability improvements, updated assets, and quality-of-life features such as an add-on manager for installing user-created content.

In January 2022, SuperTux was released on Steam as an Early Access game.

Version 0.7.0, released in 2026, introduced brand new sprites and abilities for Tux, revamped graphics, a complete level design and story rework of various levelsets, new NPCs, enemies, music, gameplay mechanics, a level editor revamp, local multiplayer, and other improvements to the code.

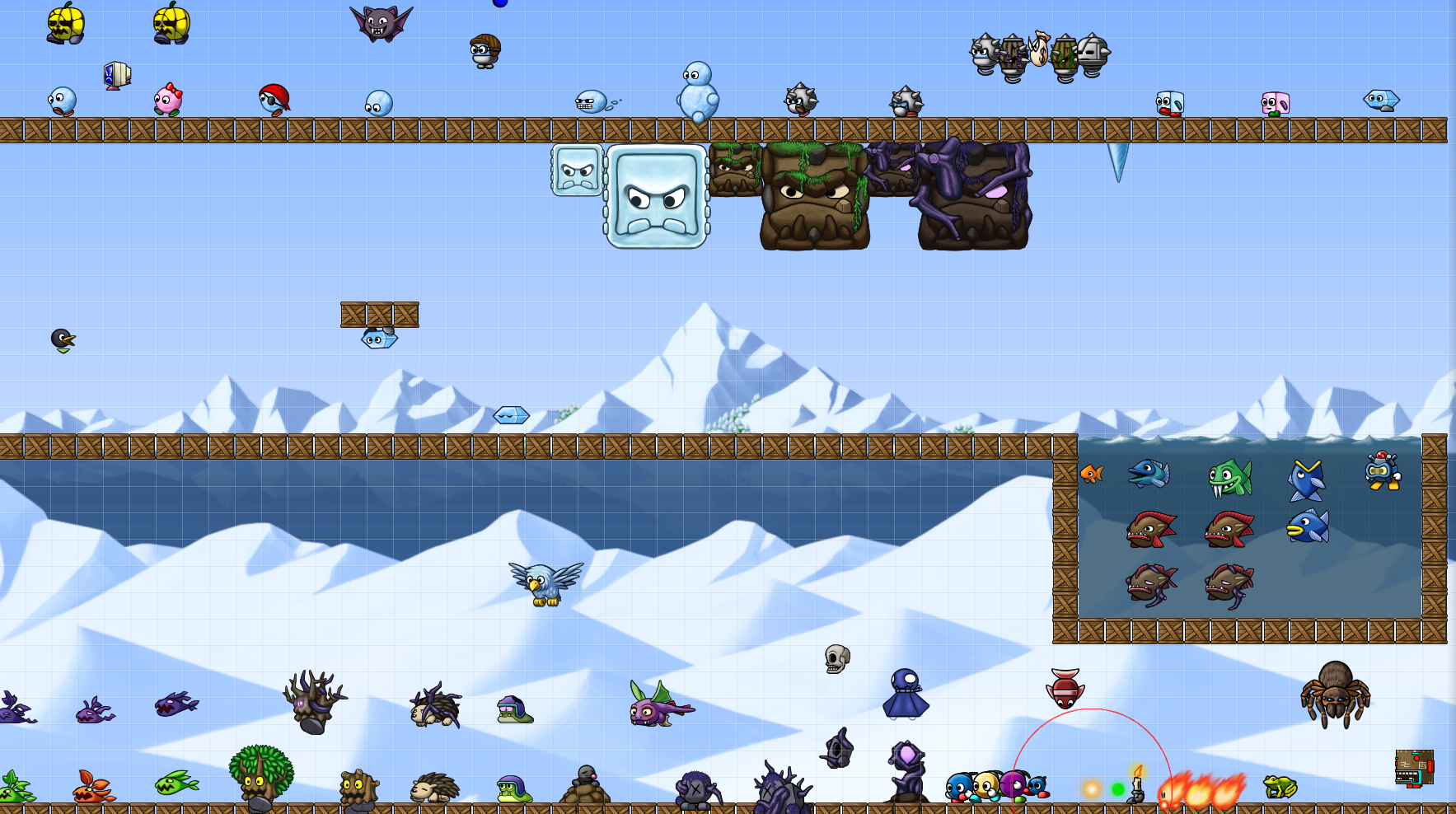
All mobs in SuperTux

Throughout its development, SuperTux has been distributed free of charge under the GNU General Public License. Official releases are made available for Linux, Windows, macOS, and various BSD systems, and are regularly packaged by Linux distributions. The game continues to be actively maintained by its volunteer community, with ongoing work on additional worlds, engine enhancements, and expanded modding support.

The game was developed under usage of Simple DirectMedia Layer as a cross-platform middlelayer targeting OpenGL and OpenAL. The game engine and physics engine are self-developed. The game's metadata are S-Expressions of the programming language Lisp, and scripts are written in Squirrel.

== Reception ==
In 2007 Punto Informatico described the atmosphere of the game as pleasant and praised the free availability of the game.

In 2008, SuperTux was used as a game for children by school district #73 in British Columbia, which had decided to transition to free and open-source software.

The game was ported to other platforms, including Wii Homebrew, GP2X, Pocket PC, PSP, and Palm WebOS. The game was also scheduled to be included in the release of the EVO Smart Console as of April 2009.

== See also ==
- Secret Maryo Chronicles
- Mari0
- SuperTuxKart
- List of open-source video games
