= Secret Maryo Chronicles =

2003 video game

- Developer: SMC Team
- Platforms: AmigaOS, Windows, Linux, Mac OS X 10.5 or higher, Pandora
- Release: January 23, 2003
- Genre: Platform
- Mode: Single-player

Secret Maryo Chronicles is a free and open-source 2D platform game first released in 2003. The game has been described as a Super Mario Bros. clone, but with a gameplay reminiscent of Super Mario World (1990).

== History ==
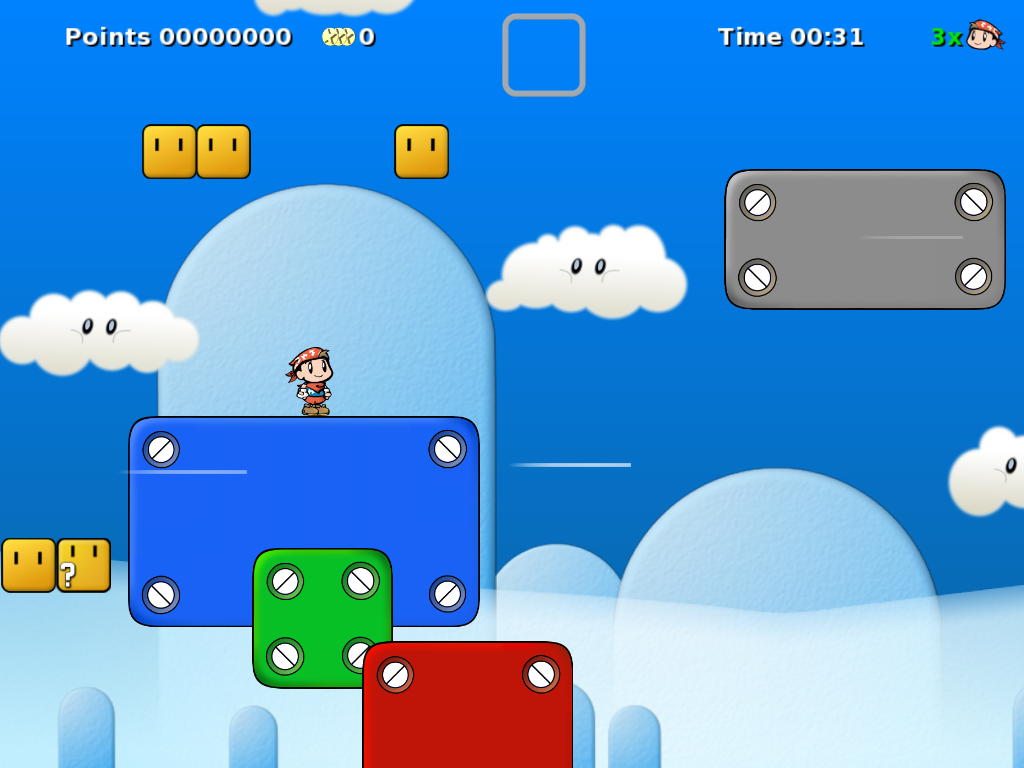
Version 2 of Secret Maryo Chronicles

Secret Maryo Chronicles began as a SourceForge project in January 2003. It was developed and is maintained by the Secret Maryo Chronicles development team, led by Florian Richter ("FluXy"). The game is OpenGL-based and has an original soundtrack and a built-in game editor. It has been released under the GNU General Public License, Version 3. The game has been expanded up the latest release in 2009.

=== The Secret Chronicles of Dr. M. ===
After the Secret Maryo Chronicles game ceased development, there now exists a continuation called The Secret Chronicles of Dr. M. (TSC) with its latest release being 2.2.0 on Oct. 27, 2024.

== Reception ==
Secret Maryo Chronicles was listed as the number one open source video game by APC in January 2008. The game was named one of the most promising open source games of 2008 by El Heraldo. In 2008, Stern praised the speed of the game and its puzzle solving, and heute praised it as a well-made nonviolent game for children. Secret Maryo Chronicles was selected in March 2009 as "HotPick" by Linux Format. An in-detail review of the Free Software Magazine in 2015 called the game a "great way to procrastinate".

The game became a popular title offered by many freeware download outlets; the game was downloaded over 3.4 million times just via SourceForge.net between 2004 and May 2017.

== See also ==
- List of unofficial Mario media
- List of open-source video games
- SuperTux
- Mari0
