= Tenés Empanadas Graciela =

Open-source turn-based strategy game

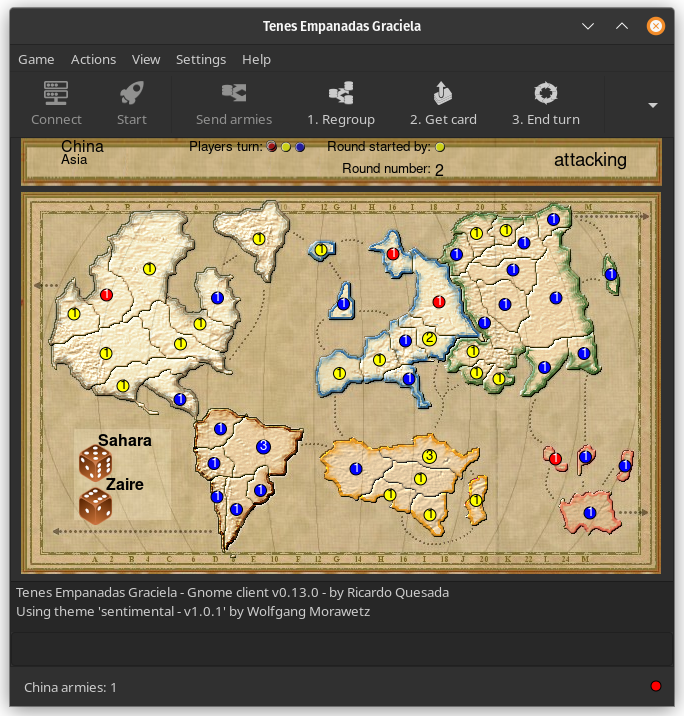
- Tenes Empanadas Graciela running on Ubuntu Linux
- Original authors: Ricardo "riq" Quesada, community
- Initial release: 1996; 30 years ago
- Stable release: 0.13.0 / 15 September 2024; 18 months ago
- Written in: C++
- Platform: cross platform
- Available in: Spanish, French, German, Polish, others
- Type: turn-based strategy
- License: GPL 3
- Website: github.com/wfx/teg
- Repository: https://github.com/wfx/teg

Tenés Empanadas Graciela (TEG) is a turn-based strategy game available in several popular Linux distributions. It is based on the board game Plan Táctico y Estratégico de la Guerra (TEG), which is based on the strategy board game Risk. It is free and open-source software (FOSS), released with a GNU General Public License (GPL) 3.

== Gameplay ==
Using a server, several players can fight for world domination and chat with each other. Maps are used as battlefields. The game is available in languages including Spanish, German, French, and Polish.

== History ==
In 1996, Argentine software developer Ricardo "riq" Quesada started developing the game and released it under the GNU GPL 2.0 only. He stopped working on it for a few years but brought the project back to life in early 2000. In time, other developers, graphic artists, and translators joined the project.

TEG was an early supporter of the FOSS multiplayer client-server system GGZ Gaming Zone.

In around 2014, the project moved from SourceForge to GitHub.

== Reception ==
Tenés Empanadas Graciela was reviewed as a notable Risk video game clone by free and open-source software associated media outlets, such as Linux Journal and Linux Magazine. In 2007, Linux.com reviewed Tenés Empanadas Graciela again as a notable Risk clone. The Linux Game Tome lists the game with 4.2 of 5 stars.

The game was reviewed in 2012 by republica.com.

=== Versions, ports ===
The game is available for Ubuntu, Debian, Gentoo, and Arch Linux, and was ported to other operating systems such as macOS.

An Argentine online version of the game is called WebTeg which allows users to play with just a web browser.

== See also ==
- Lux, a series of proprietary Risk-clones that work on Linux
- List of open source games
