= The Last Eichhof =

1993 video game

- Developers: Alpha Helix (Tritone, Tweety, Zynax)
- Initial release: 1993; 33 years ago
- Stable release: Allegro version / 2014; 12 years ago
- Platform: MS-DOS, Windows Phone, Windows
- Type: Scrolling shooter
- License: Public domain like license Allegro version: GPLv3
- Website: Original homepage (archived by archive.org)
- Repository: lasteichhof (Allegro) on SourceForge.net

The Last Eichhof is a freeware and open-source vertically scrolling shooter released for MS-DOS in 1993 by independent Swiss developer Alpha Helix. The game is similar to Xenon 2, but the player controls a beer bottle and destroys bottles belonging to rival beer companies.

== History ==
=== Development ===
In the 1990s, some students of the ETH Zürich formed a game development group called "Alpha Helix" and developed "The last Eichhof" as comment against the concentration of the Swiss beer market which led to the decline of smaller and independent breweries like "Eichhof". The Last Eichhof's code and levels were created by Daniel "Tritone" Schoch, graphics and fonts were credited to "Tweety". Additional programming and music was provided by "Zynax". Much of the music in "The Last Eichhof" comes from the songs "Schnaps Bonus" and "Bring me Edelweiss" by the pop band Edelweiss. The instrumental from the Pink Floyd song, "Money" plays during this stage where you can sell beer bottles. Many sound effects were samples taken from the TV sitcom Parker Lewis Can't Lose. The source code was later released under a "Do what ever you want with this code"-license, a Public domain like license, similar to the WTFPL.

=== Releases and ports ===
Ports to other platforms and OSes were later created by the game's community with the available source code, for instance for Linux (with Allegro), Windows XP, Windows 8 and Windows Phones.

== Gameplay ==
The object of the game is for the player to shoot cork projectiles out of the beer bottle/s and destroy as many enemies to gain as many litres of brew as possible (the game's score is tallied in terms of litres, instead of the usual points). Not only does the amount of brew collected boost the player's score, but it also provides money needed to buy supplies from the pub. In most of the levels, waves of mugs, bottles and tankards will attack the player followed by minibosses (usually crates and rival beer logos) and occasionally big bosses. In one of the levels, the player is faced by hostile champagne bottles, Daiquiris, tequilas, martinis, Jack Daniel's, and Bourbon; most of the enemies have an alcohol theme. In another level, the enemies are items associated with hangovers such as alarm clocks, coffee pots, toilets, Alka-Seltzer and Aspirin. However, there are a few enemies in the game which do not have any alcohol-related themes like the Windows logo, the MacIntosh Apple logo, Pac-Man, and a toaster screensaver.

The main beer bottle must be protected and avoid enemies, otherwise a life is lost. If all lives are lost, the game is over. Bottles that accompany the main beer bottle cannot be destroyed. Once a level has been completed, the player stops by the pub to buy extra bottles of beer to assist the main beer bottle. Four standard bottles (Stange, Pony, Barbara Braeu and Dunkel) can be purchased from the counter and many others (Can 33CL, Chuebeli, Pokal, Xenon 2 Cannon, plus Bonus Guttere for lives and Speed) can be purchased from the Menu Card. Up to six bottles can accompany the main beer bottle. After each level, the player has the choice of selling the bottles for a small reduction of what they first cost.

There are 5 levels; between each level, the player is given a chance to buy extra bottles, each with their own shooting projectiles. Note that the second to fifth level have checkpoints. If the main beer bottle is hit, the player restarts at the last checkpoint successfully passed instead of restarting at the beginning of the level.

== Reception ==
The Abandonware webpage Home of the Underdogs awarded the game the title "TopDog" and described it as a "rare freeware gem" and MobyGames considered it as "one of the most "original" games of all time".

In 2002, Czech newspaper IDNES.cz reviewed the game in detail.

In 2004, Swiss computer magazine PCtipp called "The Last Eichhof" in a review "small, but the humor makes it unique".

An article about "The Last Eichhof" was in German-language printed video game magazine Games, Entertainment, Education 2005.

In 2012, Eurogamer described in an article The Last Eichhof as "awesome". The Italian edition of The Game Machine referred to "The Last Eichhof" in an article in February 2012.

== See also ==
- List of open source games
