= PlaneShift (video game) =

Free to play MMORPG

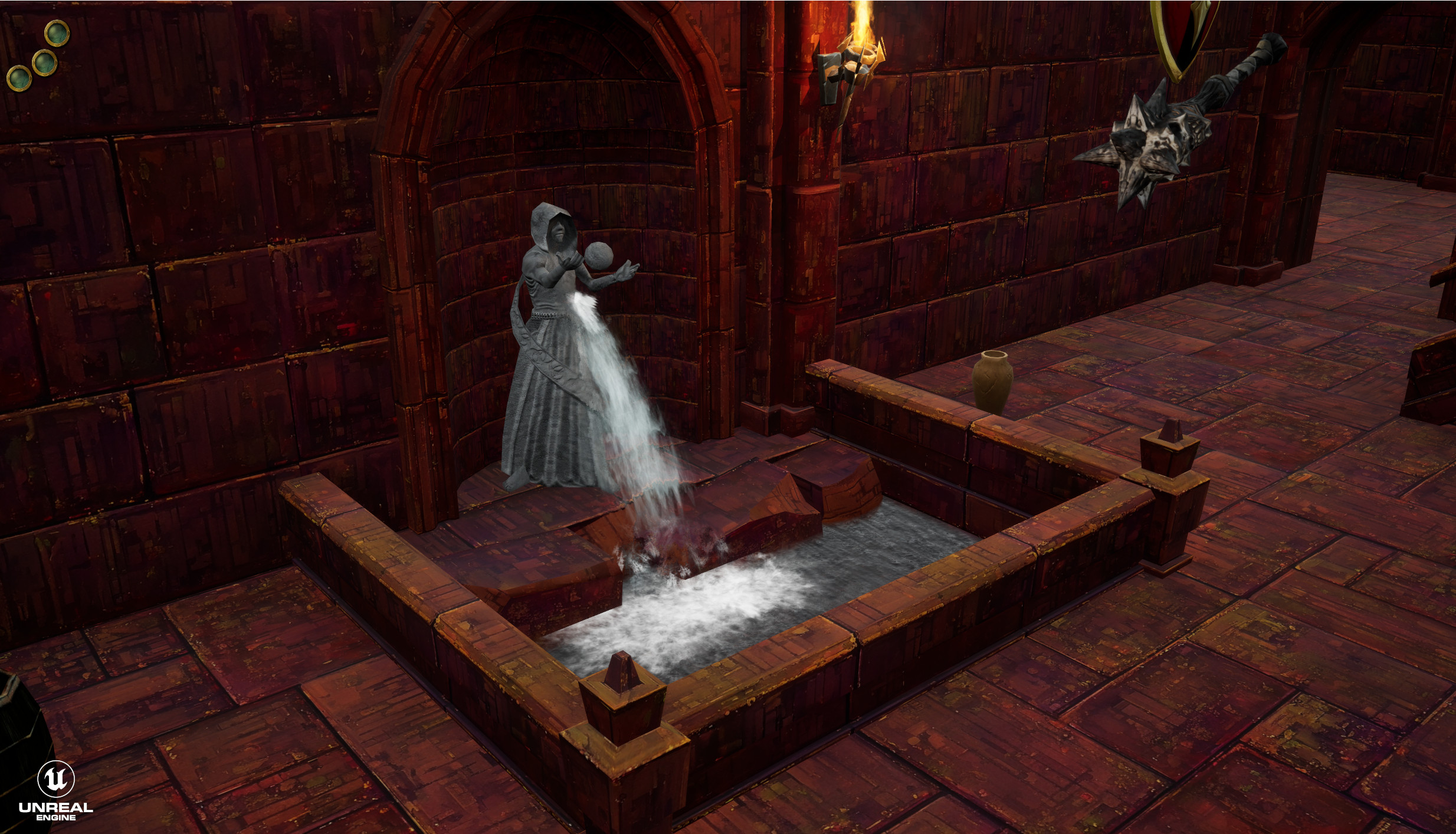
- Picture of the day for PlaneShift Unreal Release 0.7.45
- Developer: Atomic Blue (Volunteer Team)
- Release: 2 May 2002; 24 years ago
- Preview release: v0.7.45 / 24 September 2024; 2 years ago
- Written in: PlaneShift Engine, Crystal Space for 3D
- Engine: Crystal Space; Unreal Engine 5
- Platform: Microsoft Windows, macOS, Linux
- Type: Multiplayer Fantasy MMORPG
- License: GPLv2 (PSLegacy source code); PCL (content) proprietary license (PlaneShift Unreal)
- Website: http://www.planeshift.it
- Repository: http://www.sf.net/projects/planeshift

PlaneShift is a free to play, cross-platform 3D Online Multiplayer Role Playing Game in a fantasy setting. The game requires client software to be installed on the player's computer. The project is no-budget and produced by a group of developers guided by the Atomic Blue organization. The development team comprises volunteers from mostly European countries and North America.

== Setting ==
PlaneShift takes place inside a colossal stalactite named Yliakum. Players begin in the main city, Hydlaa, where they will start their journey. In most recent setting PlaneShift has 9 playable races, after returning a playable status to Diaboli, making Kran race playable and removing playable status from Ynnwn. Each race has their own homelands and characteristics. The races feature standard fantasy types, like elves and dwarves, but also humanoids made of rock and winged amphibians. Though set underground, life is possible because a crystal named the Azure Sun draws light from the surface of the planet.

== Gameplay ==
Screenshot showing Eagle Bronze Doors, an in-game area in PlaneShift

PlaneShift gameplay is based on classical Multiplayer Role Playing Game style, with exploration, magic, single player or team based combat and quests. A major goal of the game is to explore and learn. This can either be done by reading books or by learning about the world by speaking with the NPCs. The interaction with the NPCs is based on predefined answers the player can pick from a list, and also a freeform text entry, which uses natural language parsing to interpret the text. Some of these NPC's provide quests and guidance on how to proceed to gain items and powers. The quests are sequenced to allow character progression in the different skills of the game. There are also events, hosted by Game Masters, that allow for unique quests, festivals and happenings. Players increase their character's skills by completing these quests in the game. The game has strong focus on Role-play (RP). IC (In-Character) behaviour and speech are promoted by the Game Master team.

Players trade using the currency Tria, a triangle-shaped coin. There are denominations for 10, 50 and 250 Tria, named Hexas, Octas and Circles.

=== Character creation ===
The PlaneShift character creation tool features two options. The first option is to choose to make a "quick" character, in which a player chooses a "path" and the character's specific attributes are chosen based on the profession. A path reflects the career of the character in his youth, and has associated events which will set the starting skills and stats. The available paths are "Street Warrior", "Enchanter", "Fighting Monk", "Warlock", "Knight", "Rogue". The second option is to make a character with the "custom" method. This method allows the player to choose many additional aspects of the character by describing the story of their birth, parents, jobs, house, siblings, and the life events that happened up to his or her adulthood. The choices made affect the starting attributes and skills the character has.

=== Combat ===
PlaneShift features both player versus environment and player versus player combat. The latter is implemented as the ability to engage in duels on a voluntary basis, which requires both parties to agree to the conditions of the duel. If two players' guilds are at war with each other, they do not need to agree to a duel in order to initiate combat with each other. Characters attain progression points (PP) when they successfully engage in combat and use certain abilities, which are used for training attributes. PlaneShift uses a skill based progression system, which allows the player to develop this character in any skills without the mandatory choice of a profession.

=== Magic ===
PlaneShift magic comprises several distinct "Ways" (Schools): Crystal Way, Red Way, Brown Way, Azure Way, Blue Way, and Dark Way. Casting spells requires combinations of special magical items called glyphs. The spells are not known upfront, and have to be researched by combining glyphs in sequence.

== Development ==
The PlaneShift project is developed under guidance of Atomic Blue, a Texas-based non-profit organization. The PlaneShift development team is organised in several departments with corresponding leaders.

PlaneShift has been open to players for free since its first public release. The server side engine code and the client code is written from scratch by the PlaneShift team, while the 3D rendering features are based on the Crystal Space 3D engine. In 2018 support for the Crystal Space engine was discontinued, so the decision was taken to move the whole game content to Unreal Engine 4.

On February 9, 2023, the migration was completed. All player accounts were transferred. It is no longer possible to play the Crystal Space version (also called PlaneShift Legacy), and newly created characters start in the tutorial of the Unreal Version.

Throughout the migration process the main developer Luca Pancallo did live streams on YouTube and Twitch. The streams continue now that the migration is complete. There are more than 1,600 streams so far. "We still keep an open development concept, and most of our developments are done live on Twitch and Youtube."

The servers and the internet connection for the game are donated by sponsors.

Prior to the transition to Unreal Engine the game used two different licenses: the engine was released under the GNU General Public License v2, and the content was released under a proprietary license. The artwork, ruleset, dialog, and other non-engine content of PlaneShift are proprietary and licensed under a custom license: the PlaneShift Content License (PCL). The PCL prevents modifications, redistributions, and assigns the copyright of accepted contributions to Atomic Blue. This license also forbids using the content for profit or for unofficial hosting.

After the transition there are two versions of PlaneShift: PlaneShift Legacy and PlaneShift Unreal. PlaneShift Unreal is the new and current version made with Unreal Engine 5. This version is currently not open source.

The original game idea came from Luca Pancallo in 1994, who released a 2D version in 1996. The development of this game ended 1998 as no commercial support or publisher could be found. In 2000 the development was restarted aiming for a 3D version with an international team of developers. The first major version (0.1) released on May 2, 2002, was codenamed "Atomic Blue". Four different public versions of the game have come out since then, with additional functionality. PlaneShift is currently in the alpha stage of development at version 0.7.45.

Since January 22, 2026, PlaneShift is also available through Steam.

== Reception ==
Metacritic lists the game with 56 points from one review from mmorpg.com.

PlaneShift has been used in multiple studies regarding development of free software and video games. PlaneShift has been also studied as a collaborative software engineering organizational model.

== See also ==
- WorldForge
- List of open source games
