= Chromium B.S.U. =

Open source arcade-style video game

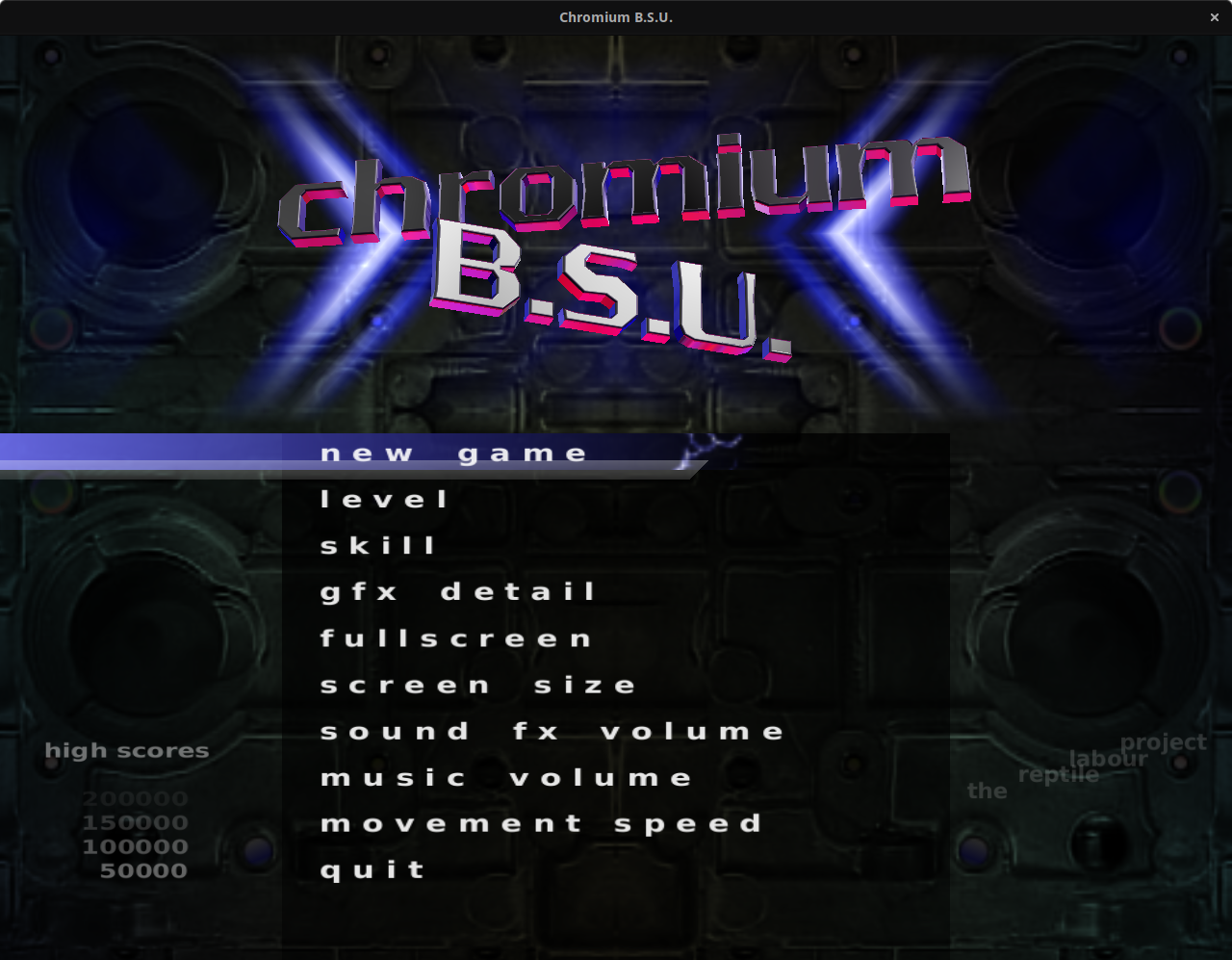
- Developers: Mark B. Allan (the main author) and others.
- Initial release: 2000
- Stable release: 0.9.16.1 / September 6, 2016; 9 years ago
- Operating system: Microsoft Windows, AmigaOS 4, Linux, Mac OS X, UNIX-like OS, PSP, iPhone
- Type: Single-player arcade
- License: Clarified Artistic, MIT
- Website: Project site

Chromium B.S.U. is an arcade-style, top-scrolling space shooter available on Windows, iPhone, PSP, Mac, AmigaOS 4, Linux and numerous other UNIX-like operating systems. It is a free software distributed under the Clarified Artistic License. The original version of Chromium B.S.U. was designed in 2000 by Mark B. Allan and released under the Artistic License. Since then it has received many contributions from the community.

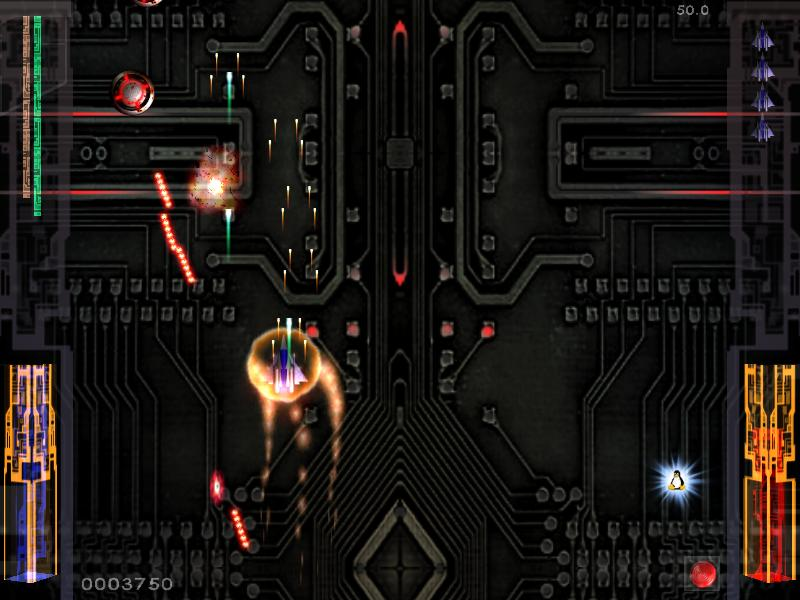
Chromium B.S.U. gameplay

== Plot ==
The storyline of Chromium B.S.U. consists of the player taking the role of a captain aboard a cargo ship. The name of the cargo ship is "Chromium B.S.U." The player is given the task of delivering cargo to troops on the front line. The cargo ship has a series of robotic fighter spaceships aboard. The players have to make use of these ships to ensure that the cargo ship makes it to the front line.

== Gameplay ==
Chromium B.S.U. is a 2D top-scrolling space shooter. Players must shoot enemy aircraft before they reach the bottom of the screen. For each aircraft that reaches the bottom of the screen, the player will lose a life. This particular rule makes Chromium B.S.U. unique amongst scrolling space shooters. Another aspect of the game's difficulty is its limited ammunition. Ammunition must be used efficiently to win.

When a player is having difficulty destroying foes, the player has two options. They can crash into enemy vessels and deal damage to the ship as well as themselves. The other alternative is to self-destruct, thereby destroying all the enemies on the screen.

In the first level of the game there are only three types of enemy ships. More enemy ships are introduced to the player as they advanced through levels. The game was designed to be played in short time intervals rather than long dedicated hours.

== Technical information ==
The game is written in C++. Graphical support is provided by OpenGL. The game demands hardware acceleration in order to reliably maintain a steady frame rate. Therefore, software implementations of OpenGL are not suitable for playing the game. SDL is used for creating the window that the OpenGL context is attached to as well as handling input events (such as mouse, keyboard, joystick). Alternatively, a user may choose GLUT rather than SDL for these things.

Audio is an option that is configurable by the user at compile time. The user may choose between OpenAL and SDL_Mixer for audio playback support. They both have their own advantages and disadvantages. A key feature of the audio system in Chromium B.S.U. is that it supports both user-defined playlists and CDROM playback. The user may choose between FTGL and QuesoGLC for font rendering.

From a library point of view Chromium B.S.U. is customizable.

== Critical reception ==
Chromium was selected on Christmas 2008 as "HotPick" by Linux Format. Ubuntu Magazine praised Chromium for its graphics, music, shooting action, easy mouse controls and challenging gameplay. Linux Planet highlighted several elements that they considered unique to a space shooter: that escaping enemies cause the player to lose a life; that the damage leeway allows the player to ram enemy ships; and the player's limited amount of ammunition. Novell recommended Chromium as a "fun stress-reliever". The Linux Game Tome listed the game with 4 of 5 stars. Between 2007 and 2019, the game was downloaded from SourceForge.net over 110,000 times.

== See also ==
- Linux gaming
- List of open source games
