= List of open-source video games =

This is a list of notable open-source video games. Open-source video games are assembled from and are themselves open-source software, including public domain games with public domain source code. This list also includes games in which the engine is open-source but other data (such as art and music) is under a more restrictive license.

== Open engine and free data ==
The games in this table are developed under one or more free and open-source software license with free content which allows reuse, modification and commercial redistribution of the whole game. Licenses can be public domain, GPL, BSD, Creative Commons, zlib, MIT, Artistic or other (see the comparison of Free and open-source software and the Comparison of free and open-source software licenses).

Title	First release	Latest release	Genre	Engine license	Content license	Dimensions	Other information	Programming language
0 A.D.	2009	2026	RTS	GPL-2.0-or-later	CC BY-SA 3.0	3D	Historic, cross-platform RTS, using an original engine named Pyrogenesis; source-code released July 10, 2009	C++, JavaScript, GLSL
2048	2014	2014	Puzzle	MIT	MIT	2D	Sliding block puzzle	Ruby, JavaScript, HTML, CSS
A Dark Room	2013	2023	Online text-based role-playing game	MPL	MPL	Text	In July 2013, source code was put on GitHub under MPL 2.0; became commercial success after source code release	Python, JavaScript, HTML, CSS
Ancient Beast	2012	2026	TBT	AGPLv3	CC BY-SA 4.0	2D	Browser based eSport where you materialize and control a squad of super deadly creatures	JavaScript, TypeScript, HTML, CSS
Abuse	1996	2011	Run and gun	Public-domain software	Public domain	2D		C, C++, newLISP, CMake, Common Lisp
Argentum Online	1999	2018	MMORPG	GPL-3.0-or-later	GPL-3.0-or-later	2D	First open-source MMORPG developed in Argentina	Visual Basic, VBA, JavaScript, C++, HTML
Armagetron Advanced	2001	2024	Racing	GPL-2.0-or-later	GPL-2.0-or-later	3D	Multiplayer 3D Tron lightcycle racing	C++
AstroMenace	2007	2025	Arcade	GPL-3.0-or-later	GPL-3.0-or-later, CC BY-SA 4.0	3D	Top-scrolling space shooter	C, C++
Ballerburg	1987	2008 (ports)	Artillery game	Public-domain software	Public domain	2D	Public-domain software on author website with source code; later ported to more operating systems: Linux, macOS, iOS, etc.	
The Battle for Wesnoth	2005	2026	TBT	GPL-2.0-or-later	GPL-2.0-or-later, CC BY-SA 4.0	2D	Turn-based tactical strategy game with RPG elements; campaign and skirmish modes for single- and multi-player	C++, Lua, Python
Biniax	2005	2012	Puzzle	zlib	zlib	2D		
Bos Wars	2004	2013	RTS	GPL-2.0-or-later	GPL-2.0-or-later	Isometric 2D	2D real-time strategy game running on modified version of Stratagus engine	C++, Lua
Brogue	2009	2018	Roguelike	GNU AGPLv3	GNU AGPLv3	Text	Like its predecessor Rogue, the goal is for the player to descend to the last dungeon level and retrieve the Amulet of Yendor.	C
BZFlag	1997	2026	Tank, FPS	LGPL-2.1-only and MPL-2.0	LGPL-2.1-only and MPL-2.0	3D	First-person shooter 3D tank-based multiplayer online game	C++
C-Dogs	2002	2026	Run and gun	Public-domain software (engine), GPL-2.0-or-later (game code)	CC0, CC BY, CC BY-SA	2D	Overhead run-and-gun, with hotseat cooperative and deathmatch play for up to four players	
Cart Life	2011	2017	Simulation	Cart Life's Free License (permissive license)	Cart Life's Free License (permissive license), Freeware	2D	In March 2014, source code and game released by Richard Hofmeier for free online, saying he was ending support; Winner of the IGF 2013 award; mirrored on GitHub	
Cataclysm: Dark Days Ahead	2013	2026	RPG, Roguelike	CC BY-SA 3.0	CC BY-SA 3.0	2D	Post-apocalypse survival roguelike with open-ended play; financed by successful Kickstarter crowdfunding campaign, 22 June 2013	C++
Chromium B.S.U.	2000	2016	Arcade	Clarified Artistic	MIT	2D	Fast-paced arcade-style top-scrolling space shooter	
Colobot	2001	2021	RTS, educational	GPL-3.0-or-later	GPL-3.0-or-later	3D	Source code of original game by EPSITEC SA released March 2012; since then, maintained by community as Colobot: Gold Edition	
Colossal Cave Adventure	1976	1995	Text adventure	Public-domain software	Public domain	Text	First text adventure game, by Crowther and Woods	
Core War	1984	1984	Programming game	Various (public domain, BSD, GPL)	Various	Text	Original created by D. G. Jones and A. K. Dewdney; continued to present by community	
Crossfire	1992	2019	MMORPG	GPL-2.0-or-later	GPL-2.0-or-later	2D	Crossfire first begun as a Gauntlet clone developed by Frank Tore Johansen at University of Oslo, Norway	
Cubyz	2019	2026	Sandbox, survival	GPL-3.0	GPL-3.0	3D, Voxel	A sandbox game focusing on exploration, building, and survival	Zig
Danger from the Deep	2003	2010	Submarine simulator	GPL-2.0-or-later	GPL-2.0-or-later	3D	WWII U-boat simulator	C++
DDraceNetwork	2013	2024	Platformer	zlib	CC BY-SA 3.0 (except font)	2D	2D online multiplayer side-scrolling co-op platformer	C++
Diamond Trust of London	2012	2012	TBS	Public-domain software	Public domain	2D	After Kickstarter crowdfunding campaign, Diamond Trust was developed by Jason Rohrer and published by indiePub; released for Nintendo DS August 28, 2012; placed in public domain, hosted on SourceForge, like most Rohrer games	
DRL	2013	2016	Roguelike	GPL-2.0-or-later	CC BY-SA 4.0	2.5D	Based on Doom and Doom II	
Duelyst	2016	2023	Collectible card game	CC0	CC0	2D	Built using Node.js, open source release 2023	
Dungeon Crawl Stone Soup	2006	2026	Roguelike	GPL-2.0-or-later	CC0	2D	Fork of 1997 Linley's Dungeon Crawl	C++
Endgame: Singularity	2005	2020	Science fiction/AI simulation game	GPL-2.0-or-later	CC BY-SA 3.0	2D	Written in Python by EMH, later continued by community	
Endless Sky	2015	2026	Space trading and combat simulator	GPL-3	Public domain, various CC licenses	2D	Inspired by Escape Velocity series; updated continuously	C++
Enigma	2003	2021	Puzzle	GPL-2.0-or-later	GPL-2.0-or-later	2D	Oxyd clone	
Fish Fillets NG	2004	2011	Puzzle	GPL-2.0-or-later	GPL-2.0-or-later	2D	Released commercially as Fish Fillets in 1998. Source released in 2002 under GPL-2.0-or-later	
FlightGear	1997	2026	Flight sim	GPL-2.0-or-later	GPL-2.0-or-later	3D	Microsoft Flight Simulator-inspired clone	C++, Nasal
Freeciv	1996	2026	TBS	GPL-2.0-or-later	GPL-2.0-or-later	Isometric 2D	Civilization II clone	
FreeCol	2003	2024	TBS	GPL-2.0-or-later	GPL-2.0-or-later	Isometric 2D	Sid Meier's Colonization clone	Java
FreeDink	2006	2019	RPG	GPL-3.0-or-later	GPL-3.0-or-later	2D	Dink Smallwood fork with non-free assets replaced with free ones	C++
Friday Night Funkin'	2020	TBA	Rhythm game	Apache License 2.0	The Funkin' Crew Inc.	2D	An upcoming 2D Rhythm game that follows a character called Boyfriend (yes that's his actual name) as he rap battles various opponents in order to date his Girlfriend (yes that's also her actual name).	Haxe
Frozen Bubble	2002	2008	Puzzle	GPL-2.0-only	GPL-2.0-only	2D	Puzzle Bobble clone	
Gang Garrison 2	2008	2019	Shooter	Proprietary (engine), MPLv2 (game code)	MPLv2	2D	Retro "demake" of Team Fortress 2; project formerly under GPLv3	
Glest	2004	2008	RTS	GPL-3.0-or-later	CC BY-SA 3.0	3D	3D real-time strategy game with two factions, AI, and same-platform networking support. Development ceased in 2008. Two forks exist, named MegaGlest and Glest Advanced Engine	
Globulation 2	2008	2009	RTS	GPL-3.0-or-later	GPL-3.0-or-later	2D	In open beta as of 2019	
GLtron	2003	2016	Racing	GPL-2.0-or-later	GPL-2.0-or-later	3D	Based on the light cycle portion of the film Tron	
GNOME Games	1997	2021	Various	GPL-3.0-or-later	GPL-3.0-or-later		Set of games included with GNOME desktop environment	
GNU Chess	1984	2025	TBS	GPL-3.0-or-later	GPL-3.0-or-later	2D	Chess-playing engine developed by GNU Project	
GNU Go	1999	2009	TBS	GPL-3.0-or-later	GPL-3.0-or-later	2D	Go-playing engine developed by GNU Project	
Hunt the Wumpus	1973	1981	Survival horror, adventure, puzzle	Various (Public-domain software, GPLv2, MIT)	Various (Public-domain software, GPLv2, MIT)	2D	Hunt a monster named Wumpus while moving through caves	
HyperRogue	2011	2021	Puzzle, Roguelike, Educational	GPL-2.0-or-later	GPL-2.0-or-later	Hyperbolic	Puzzle roguelike in the hyperbolic plane	
kiki the nano bot	2003	2007	Puzzle	Public-domain software	Public domain	3D	Mixture of Sokoban and Kula World	
Lincity	1999	2013	City-building game	GPL-2.0-only	GPL-2.0-only	2.5D	SimCity clone	
Liquid War	1995	2015	Maze games	GPL-3.0-or-later	GPL-3.0-or-later	2D	2D game; control particles and move them to defeat the opposing side	
Luanti (formerly Minetest)	2010	2026	Sandbox, survival	zlib (engine), LGPL-2.1-or-later (game code)	LGPL-2.1-or-later	3D, Voxel	Voxel engine for building games similar to Infiniminer and Minecraft	C++, Lua
Lugaru	2005	2017	Action, third-person shooter	GPL-2.0-or-later	CC BY-SA	3D	By Wolfire Games; player is an anthropomorphic rabbit who seeks revenge when a group of enemy rabbits kill their family	
Madness Interactive Reloaded	2024	2025	Shoot 'em up	GPL-3.0-or-later	CC BY 3.0	2D	highly moddable 2D shooter developed by Studio Minus that aims to capture the fast-paced, violent combat of the Madness Combat series from Newgrounds	C#
Maelstrom	1992	2010	Shoot 'em up	GPL-2.0-only	CC BY 3.0	2D		
Mari0	2012	2018	Platformer	zlib (engine), MIT (game code)	MIT	2D	Remake of Super Mario Bros. with elements from Portal	
MegaGlest	2010	2016	RTS	GPL-3.0-or-later	CC BY-SA 3.0	3D	Cross-platform 3D real-time strategy game for up to eight players (can be AI-controlled) on seven factions. MegaGlest is a fork of Glest	
Meridian 59	1996	2024	MMORPG	GPL-2.0-only	GPL-2.0-only	2.5D	Free MMORPG; fight alongside friends, side with powerful factions, explore diverse environments	C, C++
Mindustry	2017	2026	RTS, TD, sandbox	GPL-3.0	GPL-3.0	2D	The automation tower defense RTS, written in Java	Java
Moria	1983	1999	RPG, Roguelike	GPL-2.0-only	GPL-2.0-only	2D	Roguelike RPG based heavily on J. R. R. Tolkien's novel The Lord of the Rings	Pascal, C
NetHack	1987	2026	RPG, Roguelike	NetHack GPL	NetHack GPL	Text	Single-player dungeon exploration game	C
Netrek	1988	2020	Shoot 'em up	MIT	MIT	2D	Successor to 1986 Xtrek, Netrek was first played in 1988; was the third Internet game, the first Internet team game, and as of 2022 is the oldest Internet game still played actively	
Nexuiz	2005	2009	FPS	GPL-2.0-or-later	GPL-2.0-or-later	3D	Forked into Xonotic	
NoGravity	1997 (?)	2005	Space shooter	GPL-2.0-or-later	GPL-2.0-or-later	3D	Source code of Wing Commander-inspired game released by realtech VR February 16, 2005	
One Hour One Life	2018	2023	Survival	Public domain	Public domain	2D	Multiplayer co-op survival game	
Oolite	2006	2020	Space sim	GPL-2.0-or-later	Dual-licensed under GPL-2.0-or-later, CC BY-NC-SA 3.0	3D	Elite clone	Objective-C
OpenArena	2005	2012	FPS	GPL-2.0-or-later	GPL-2.0-or-later	3D	Quake III clone	
OpenCity	2003	2008	City-building game	GPL-2.0-or-later	GPL-2.0-or-later	3D	SimCity clone	
OpenClonk	2010	2018	Action, platformer	ISC	CC BY	2D	Successor of the Clonk shareware series	
OpenTTD	2005	2026	Business sim	GPL-2-0-only	GPL-2-0-only, GPL-2-0-or-later, CC BY-SA 3.0, CDDL 1.1	2D	Open-source clone of Transport Tycoon Deluxe	
Passage	2007	2007	Side-scroller	Public-domain software	Public domain	2D	Rohrer released source code and assets into public domain, 2007, while asking for donations (donationware) and selling an iOS version for $0.99	
Pingus	1998	2011	Puzzle	GPL-3.0-or-later	GPL-3.0-or-later	2D	Lemmings clone	
Pinball Construction Set	1982	1983	Pinball, game creation system	MIT	MIT	2D	First construction set video game, and one of the initial Electronic Arts releases	
Pioneer	2006	2026	Space sim	GPL-3.0-only	CC BY-SA	3D	Inspired by Frontier: Elite 2	
PokerTH	2006	2026	Card	AGPL-3.0-or-later	AGPL-3.0-or-later	2D	Open-source virtual poker game	
Red Eclipse	2011	2019	FPS	zlib	CC BY-SA	3D	Fork of Cube 2: Sauerbraten, with improved graphics and play incorporating parkour movement	
Rigs of Rods	2005	2022	Vehicle sim	GPL-3.0-or-later	GPL-3.0-or-later	3D	Rigs of Rods was initially created as an off-road truck simulator, but has developed into a versatile physics sandbox	
ROTA	2022	2025	Puzzle platformer	Switched from Unlicense to MIT	Switched from Unlicense to MIT	2D	Platformer; player rotates world to solve puzzles	GDScript
Ryzom	2004	2024	MMORPG	AGPL-3.0-or-later	CC BY-SA 3.0	3D	All textures, effects, 3D models, animations, characters, clothing (no music or sounds) under CC BY-SA	
Scorched 3D	2001	2014	Artillery game	GPL-2.0-or-later	GPL-2.0-or-later	3D	Clone of Scorched Earth	
SCP - Containment Breach	2012	2018	Survival horror	zlib (game engine), CC BY-SA 3.0 (game code)	CC BY-SA 3.0	3D	Horror; based on SCP Foundation collaborative writing project	Blitz3D
Secret Maryo Chronicles	2003	2014	Platformer	GPL-3.0-or-later	GPL-3.0-or-later	2D	2D platformer inspired by Super Mario series	
Space Station 14	2015	2026	RPG	MIT	CC BY-SA 3.0	2D	Space Station 13 remake, intended as successor	C#
The Secret Chronicles of Dr. M.	2017	2020	Platformer	GPL-3.0-or-later	GPL-3.0-or-later	2D	2D platformer inspired by Super Mario series	
Seven Kingdoms	1997	2017	RTS	GPL-2.0-or-later	GPL-2.0-or-later	2D	Source code released in 2009	
Shattered Pixel Dungeon	2014	2026	Rogue-like game	GPL-3.0-or-later	Java	2D	Rogue-Like game with procedurally generated levels and a storyline	Java
Simutrans	1997	2026	Business sim	Artistic	Artistic	2D	Similar to Transport Tycoon and its open-source clone OpenTTD. The player must build a profitable transportation system	
Sintel The Game	2012	2012	RPG	GPL	CC BY, GPL	3D	Based on Blender Foundation film Sintel	
Soldat	2002	2020	Action	MIT	CC BY 4.0	2D	Source code release May 26, 2020, under MIT on GitHub	
Sopwith	1984	2014	Shoot 'em up	GPL	GPL	2D	C and x86 assembly source code released in 2000, at first under a non-commercial use license, then later under GNU GPL at request of fans	x86 assembly, C
Speed Dreams	2010	2023	Sim racing	GPL-2.0-or-later	FAL	3D	Forked from TORCS in late 2008	
SuperTux	2003	2026	Platformer	GPL-3.0-or-later	Various	2D	2D platformer inspired by Super Mario series	C++, Scheme (programming language), Squirrel (programming language), C Sharp (programming language), Shell script
SuperTuxKart	2006	2022	Racing	GPL-3.0-or-later	Various	3D	Arcade racing game similar to Mario Kart	
Teeworlds	2007	2020	Platformer	zlib	CC BY-SA 3.0 (except font)	2D	2D online multiplayer side-scrolling shooter	
Tenés Empanadas Graciela	1996	2021	TBS	GPL-2-0-only	GPL-2-0-only	2D	Based on the boardgame Risk	
The Castle Doctrine	2014	2014	MMO	Public-domain software	Public domain	2D	By Jason Rohrer, developed on a SourceForge repository and sold on Steam for $15.99	
The Powder Toy	2010	2023	Sandbox game	GPL-3.0-only	GPL-3.0-only	2D	Falling-sand game	
Thrive	2013	2026	God game, Life simulation game			3D		C Sharp (programming language), GDScript
Tremulous	2006	2009	FPS	GPLv2	CC BY-SA 2.5	3D	Alien vs. human base-building, defending, and attacking the opposing team	
TripleA	2002	2020	TBS	GPL-3.0-or-later	GPL-3.0-or-later	2D	Turn-based strategy; inspired by board game Axis & Allies; development ongoing	
Tux Racer	2000	2009	Racing	GPL-2.0-or-later	GPL-2.0-or-later	3D	Downhill slalom racing game featuring Tux, the Linux mascot	
Tux, of Math Command	2001	2011	Educational game	GPL-3.0-or-later	GPL-3.0-or-later	2D		
UFO: Alien Invasion	2006	2016	TBT	GPL-2.0-or-later	GPL-2.0-or-later, CC BY-SA 3.0	3D	Inspired by XCOM series but with 3D combat on surface of Earth	
UltraStar Deluxe	2007	2020	Music	GPL-2.0-or-later	GPL-2.0-or-later	2D	SingStar clone	
Unknown Horizons	2008	2019	City-building game	GPL-x2.0-or-later	GPL-2.0-or-later, CC BY-SA 3.0, OFLv1	Isometric 2D	Genre-mix of city-building game and real-time strategy game, inspired by Anno series	
Unvanquished	2012	2026	FPS	BSD 3-clause, GPLv3+	CC BY-SA 2.5	3D	Team-based first-person shooter with strong real-time strategy elements, derived from the Tremulous project	
Vega Strike	2008	2022	Space sim	GPL-2.0-or-later	GPL-2.0-or-later	3D	Wing Commander: Privateer clone and space simulator engine	
Veloren	2018	2024	Adventure, RPG	GPL-3.0-or-later	GPL-3.0-or-later	3D, Voxel	Open-world, open-source multiplayer voxel RPG	Rust
Warzone 2100	1999	2026	RTS, RTT	GPL-2.0-or-later	GPL-2.0-or-later, CC0, other open source	3D	Post-apocalypse cross-platform real-time strategy	
Widelands	2002	2026	RTS	GPL-2.0-or-later	GPL-2.0-or-later	2D	Widelands is a real-time strategy clone of The Settlers II	
WorldForge	1998	2014	MMORPG	GPL-3.0-or-later	GPL-2.0-or-later	3D	Framework for massively multiplayer online role-playing games	
Worms?	1983	1983	Software toy	MIT	MIT	2D	Interactive version of Paterson's worms, one of the first Electronic Arts releases	
Xconq	1987	2005	TBS	GPL-2.0-or-later	GPL-2.0-or-later		4X strategy game engine	
X-Moto	2005	2023	Platformer	GPL-2.0-or-later	GPL-2.0-or-later	2D	Elasto Mania clone	
Xonotic	2010	2023	FPS	GPL-2.0-or-later	GPL-2.0-or-later	3D	Fork and direct successor of Nexuiz; binary files for Linux and Windows under GPLv3+	
XPilot	1992	2010	Arcade	GPL-2.0-or-later	GPL-2.0-or-later	2D	Multiplayer, Asteroids-like	
Yo Frankie!	2008	2009	Action-adventure	GPL-2.0-or-later, LGPLv2.1	CC BY 3.0	3D		

== Open-source games with non-free data (or not entirely free data) ==
Only the game engines in this table are developed under an open-source license, which means that the reuse and modification of only the code is permitted. As some of the games' content created by the developers (sound, graphics, video and other artwork) is proprietary or restricted in use, the whole games are non-free and restricted in reuse (depending on the content license). The motivation of developers to keep own game content non-free while they open the source code may be the protection of the game as sellable commercial product. It could also be the prevention of a commercialization of a free product in future, e.g. when distributed under a non-commercial license like CC NC. By replacing the non-free content with free content, these games could also become completely free. In practice, many projects include a mixture of free and non-free own content.

Title	First release	Latest release	Genre	Engine license	Content license	Dimensions	Other information
Angband	1990	2016	Roguelike	GPLv2	GPLv2, Proprietary	Text	
AssaultCube	2006	2022	FPS	zlib	Freeware	3D	Based on Cube. A lightweight online FPS (45-50 MB package), with a built-in map maker and capable of being played with a 56k connection.
C-evo	1999	2013	TBT, 4X	Public-domain software	Proprietary	2D	Inspired by Sid Meier's Civilization
Alien Arena	2004	2011	FPS	GPL	Proprietary	3D	Based on ID Software open-source engine.
Celeste 64: Fragments of the Mountain	2024	2024	Platformer	MIT license	Proprietary	3D	An open-source game made for the six anniversary of Celeste.
Illarion	2000	2025	MMORPG	AGPL	Proprietary	3D	
Cube	2002	2005	FPS	zlib	Proprietary	3D	Deathmatch style multiplayer gameplay with map editing.
Cube 2: Sauerbraten	2004	2020	FPS	zlib	Various non-free and some free licenses	3D	Deathmatch style multiplayer gameplay with map editing.
Doom	1993	1997	FPS	GPL	Shareware	2.5D	Game engine source code was released on December 23, 1997.
Frets on Fire	2006	2008	Music	GPL	GPL, Proprietary	3D	Guitar Hero clone.
Friday Night Funkin'	2020	2026	Rhythm	MIT (engine), Apache 2.0 (game)	Proprietary	2D	2D rhythm game; play similar to Dance Dance Revolution, aesthetics similar to early–mid 2000s browser games. Built with HaxeFlixel.
Frogatto & Friends	2010	2013	Platformer	zlib license	Proprietary	2D	Initially for Windows, Linux, and Mac; hold and toss enemies, swim, talk; scripting language included.
Gravity Bone	2008	2009	Platformer	GPLv2	Freeware	3D	Brendon Chung built this game on base of the Quake II engine and released therefore the game's source code in 2008. In 2015 ported to Linux and the OpenPandora handheld.
H-Craft Championship	2007	2015	Racing	zlib	Free for personal use	3D	Sci-fi racer for Linux, Windows and Android which is using the Irrlicht engine.
Hammerfight	2009	2011	physics based combat	zlib	commercial	2D	For the third Humble Indie Bundle Ryan C. Gordon ported the underlying game engine, "Haaf's Game Engine", to Linux and Mac OS X, and released source code under the zlib license.
Katawa Shoujo	2012	2012	Visual novel	MIT license (most of game and engine beside some scripts)	CC BY-NC-ND	2D	A visual novel.
Narcissu	2005	2005	Visual novel	GPL	Freeware/PFSL	2D	Is a free visual novel by the dōjin group stage-nana, telling the story of a terminally ill young man and woman. The English version was made with the ONScripter engine.
OpenFront	2024	2025	RTS	AGPL v3.0 with Additional Attribution Terms	Mostly CC BY-SA 4.0, some Proprietary assets	2D	Online browser based real time strategy game. Started originally as WarFront.io fork in MIT license.
osu!	2007	2023	Rhythm game	MIT license	CC BY-NC 4.0	2D	Open-source clone of several games, including Osu! Tatakae! Ouendan!, Taiko no Tatsujin and beatmania IIDX. On August 28, 2016, an Open-source re-write of the osu! client was announced (code named osu!lazer). It was released under the MIT License on GitHub, assets under CC BY-NC. Aims is to make osu!, written in C# with the .NET Framework, available to more platforms and transparent. The closed-source stable osu client is still used by a large portion of the playerbase, however it is feature locked and the developers aim to deprecate it once osu!lazer gains user acceptance.
Overgrowth	2008	2017	Action	Apache License 2.0	Proprietary	3D	Source code released on 2022, April 22.
PlaneShift	2001	2016	MMORPG	GPL	Proprietary	3D	Free to play MMORPG.
Rocks'n'Diamonds	1995	2025	Puzzle	GPL-2.0-or-later	Unclear	2D	A puzzle game that is a clone of Boulder Dash-style games and Sokoban. The Debian distribution excludes this title, as it is unclear whether the stated license extends to the game data.
OpenJK	2003	2020	Third-person shooter	GPLv2	Proprietary	3D	Source code was released as GPLv2 by Raven Software and Activision following the dissolution of Lucas Arts in 2013.
Steel Storm: Episode I	2010	2010	Action	GPLv2	CC BY-NC-SA 3.0		Based on DarkPlaces. An indie top-down arcade shooter with single-player, deathmatch, and co-op.
StepMania	2001	2018	Rhythm game	MIT	MIT, CC-BY-NC	2D, 3D	DDR clone, player must hit buttons or keys timed with music. The content is under MIT license except the included musics.
Smokin' Guns	2009	2012	FPS	GPLv2	Proprietary	3D	Western-themed first-person shooter using the ioquake3 engine.
Tales of Maj'Eyal	2012	2016	RPG/Roguelike	GPL-3.0-or-later	GPL-3.0-or-later, Proprietary	2D	Developed open-source from the beginning with the own T4E engine, while the assets are kept proprietary for commercialization on Steam and gog.com.
The Dark Mod	2009	2023	Stealth game	GPL-3.0-or-later	CC BY-NC-SA	3D	First person stealth game in the style of the Thief games (1 and 2) using a modified Id Tech 4 engine
The Last Eichhof	1993	2014	Shoot-'em-up	"Do whatever your want" license (public domain)	Freeware	2D	Shoot-'em-up game released for DOS in 1993 by Swiss development group Alpha Helix. Source code released in 1995.
The Ur-Quan Masters	2002	2021	Action-adventure	GPL-2.0-or-later	CC BY-NC-SA-2.5	2D	Source port of Star Control II.
The White Chamber	2005	2006 / 2013	Adventure	MIT license (Wintermute Engine) / CC BY-NC-SA (game code)	CC BY-NC-SA / Freeware	2D	The White Chamber and its Wintermute source code have been under CC BY-NC-SA Creative Commons license. That means anyone is free to share and modify the game as long Studio Trophis is credited, it is not for commercial gain and that the result is made available under a similar license. 2013 the Wintermute engines source code was released under MIT.
TORCS	1997	2016	Racing	GPL	Free Art License, Proprietary	3D	Some car models are non-free, but there is a DFSG-compliant version which does not include them.
Urban Terror	2000	2018	FPS	GPL	Proprietary	3D	Multiplayer tactical shooter based on the id tech 3 engine.
VDrift	2005	2012	Racing	GPL-3.0-or-later	GPL-3.0-or-later, Proprietary	3D	Some data are non-free, for example the "SV" car model, under a CC BY-NC-SA license.
Warsow	2005	2017	FPS	GPL-2.0-or-later	CC BY-SA 4.0, CC BY-ND 4.0	3D	A fast-paced arena FPS with movement tricks.
World of Padman	2007	2008	FPS	GPL	Proprietary		Originally a Quake III modification. Became stand-alone in 2007, now runs on ioquake3.
Zero-K	2010	2023	RTS	GPL-2.0-or-later	various, CC BY-NC-ND 2.0 (sound)	3D	A multi-platform real time strategy game inspired by Total Annihilation, powered by the Spring game engine. Released 2018 on Steam.

== Open-source remakes with non-free data from the proprietary original ==
The video game remakes in this table were developed under an open-source license which allows usually the reuse, modification and commercial redistribution of the code. The required game content (artwork, data, etc.) is taken from a proprietary and non-opened commercial game, so that the whole game is non-free. See also the Game engine recreation page.

Title	First release	Latest release	Genre	Engine license	Content license	Dimensions	Other information	
Arx Libertatis	2012	2022	RPG, Immersive sim	GPL-3.0-or-later	Proprietary, content from Arx Fatalis	3D	Engine remake	
Daggerfall Unity	?	2024	RPG	Proprietary (engine) /MIT License (game code)	Proprietary, content from The Elder Scrolls II: Daggerfall.	3D	Engine remake	
OpenAge	?	2023	RTS	GPL-3.0-or-later	Proprietary, content from Age of Empires II	2D	Engine remake	
OpenMW	2008	2025	RPG	GPL-3.0-or-later	Proprietary / CC BY SA (OpenMW Example Suit)	3D	Engine remake of The Elder Scrolls III: Morrowind.	
OpenRA	2009	2025	RTS	GPL-3.0-or-later	Proprietary, content from the freeware releases of the classic games.	2D	Engine remake for the classic games in the Command & Conquer franchise, in particular Red Alert.	
OpenRW	2019	2020	Action-adventure	GPL-3.0-or-later	Proprietary, content from Grand Theft Auto III and Grand Theft Auto: Vice City.	3D	Engine remake	
OpenRCT2	2014	2026	Simulation	GPL-3.0-or-later	Proprietary, content from Rollercoaster Tycoon 2 and if chosen, RollerCoaster Tycoon 1 and the expansion packs as well.	2D	Engine remake	
Taisei	2017	2024	Shooter	MIT	CC BY 4.0, CC0-1.0	2D	Manic shooter derived by Tōhō series	C
OpenXcom	2009	2020	TBТ	GPL-3.0-or-later	Proprietary, content from the X-COM: UFO Defense or Terror from the Deep releases of the classic games, which the user needs to have a copy of.	2D	Engine remake	
Pizza Legacy	2026	2026	Business simulation game	GPL-3.0-or-later	Proprietary software, content from Pizza Tycoon.	2D	Engine remake	
Julius	2018	2021	City-building	AGPL-3.0-or-later	Proprietary, proprietary content from Caesar III.	2D	Engine remake	
VCMI	2022	2025	TBS	GPL-2.0	Proprietary, content from Heroes of Might and Magic III.	2D	Engine remake	
OpenCE https://github.com/OpenCommunityEdition/OpenCE/tree/main#licence	2023	2026	FPS	AGPLv3	proprietary, requires halo ce xbox	3d	engine remake	

== Source-available games ==
Video games in this table are source-available, but are neither open-source software according to the OSI definition nor free software according to the Free Software Foundation. These games are released under a license with limited rights for the user, for example only the rights to read and modify the game's source for personal or educational purposes but no reuse rights beside the game's original context are granted. Typical licenses are the creative commons "non-commercial" licenses (e.g. CC BY-NC-SA), MAME like licenses or several shared source licenses.

Title	First release	Latest release	Genre	Engine license	Content license	Dimensions	Other information
Alien Swarm	2010	2010	Shooter game	Non-commercial usable and shareable	Freeware	3D	In 2010 Valve released this Source engine based game with source code, which started as a mod.
Bugdom	1999	2003	Platformer	CC BY-NC-SA 4.0	CC BY-NC-SA 4.0	3D	Released under a non-commercial license in 2020.
Barotrauma	2019	2026	Submarine simulator, survival-horror, RPG	Custom, for mod development only	Proprietary	2D, side scrolling	In 2017, the source code was published on GitHub.
Hero Core	2010	2013	Shooter game	Non-commercial, attribution required	Freeware	2D	Around 2013 Daniel Remar released the GameMaker source code of the game, together with the sources of his other games like Iji.
Flow	2006	2009	Life simulation	? (educational purposes)	Freeware	2D (layered)	Around 2009 the flash source code was made available for educational purposes by the developers.
Fortress Forever	2007	2018	FPS	Proprietary		3D	Unofficial, open-source Source engine successor to Team Fortress Classic.
Half-Life	1998	2023	FPS	Proprietary	?	3D	The source code of Half-Life is available, but the source code of the game engine that Half-Life uses, GoldSrc, is not available.
Half-Life 2	2004	2024	FPS	Proprietary		3D	Available through Source SDK 2004 and later.
I Wanna Be the Guy	2007	2011	Platform game	Proprietary	Freeware	2D	On November 9, 2011, the developer Michael "Kayin" O'Reilly released the source code of the game under an own software license (forbidding new content) so that the game's community would be able to create fixes and patches.
Jump 'n Bump	1998	1999	Deathmatch, platformer	Emailware	Emailware	2D	1998 freeware DOS platform video game, written in C and Assembly language by Brainchild Design. The source code was released in 1999, then source ported to several other operating systems and platforms via SDL.
Larn	1986	2016	Roguelike	Non-commercial	Freeware	Text	
Noctis	2000	2003	Platformer	WTOF Public License	Freeware	3D	Space exploration/flight simulation
Notrium	2003	2008	Top-down shooter, survival game	custom FOSS license / GPLv3	custom FOSS license / Freeware	2D	Notrium's source code was released by the developer after 2003 under a custom software license and is developed as OpenNotrium on GitHub since then, with new code being GPLv3.
Prince of Persia	1989	1989	Cinematic platformer, action-adventure	Proprietary	Proprietary	2D	On April 17, 2012, Jordan Mechner released the Apple II source code of the game on GitHub.
Progress Quest	2002	2011	Parody MMORPG	Proprietary	Freeware	2D	On May 20, 2011, Eric Fredricksen released the source code of the game on bitbucket.
Racer	2003	2011 (proprietary)	Sim racing	Proprietary	Proprietary, Freeware		Only source code of 0.5 version is available, all other releases are closed source.
Space Engineers	2013	2018	Sandbox, simulation	Distribution as mod allowed	Proprietary	3D	
Space Station 13	2003	2024	RPG	Proprietary	GNU AGPLv3 / CC BY-NC-SA / Others (depends on server)	2D	Many different servers exist each with a different codebase and different license.
Spelunky	2008	2009	Platformer	Non-commercial	Freeware	2D	The source code of the 2008's Windows freeware version was published on December 25, 2009, under a software license permitting noncommercial distribution and modification. Based on this source code the game community created a community patch which added support for Mac OS X. The source code for the 2012 remake has not been made available.
Team Fortress 2	2007	2025	FPS	Proprietary		3D	Released alongside the Source SDK 2013 source code on February 18, 2025.
Visual Pinball	2000	2019	Pinball simulation editor and game	MAME like license	diverse	3D	Many free custom tables and recreations of original machines available. The program is also able to operate with Visual PinMAME.
VVVVVV	2010	2020	Platformer	Attribution required	Proprietary	2D	On the 10th anniversary of the game's release in January 2020, developer Terry Cavanagh made its source code publicly available on GitHub.

== Proprietary developed games, later released under varying licenses ==
For games that were originally developed proprietary as commercial closed source product, see also Category:Commercial video games with freely available source code.

== See also ==
- List of game engines
- List of open-source first-person shooters
- List of commercial video games with available source code
- List of commercial video games released as freeware
- List of freeware video games
- Homebrew
- Linux gaming
