= PokerTH =

2006 open-source video game based on Texas hold 'em

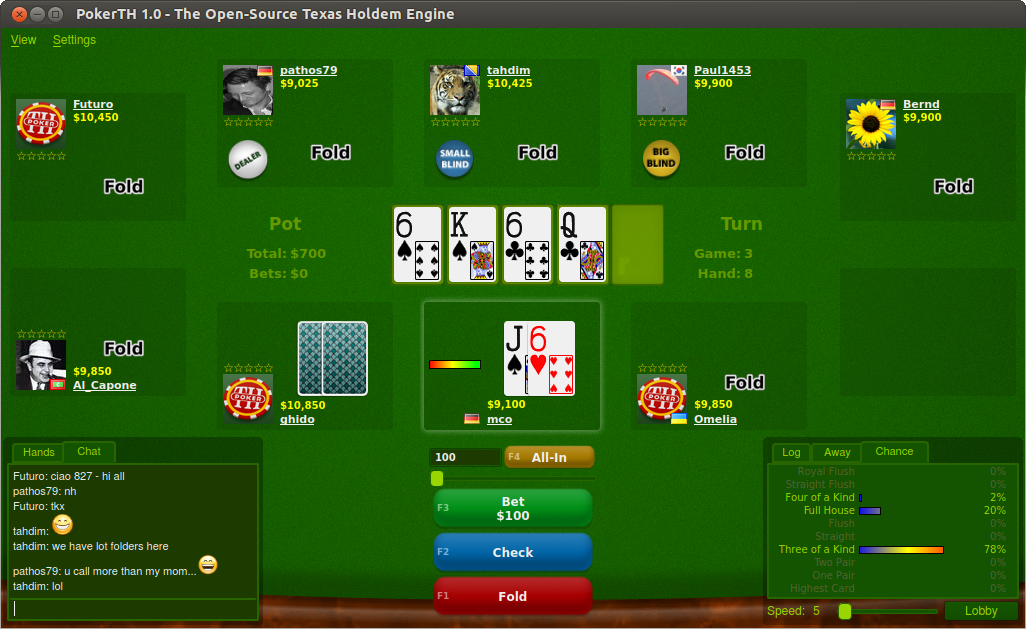
- A session of PokerTH 1.0 in progress.
- Release: v0.2 (first public release) October 4, 2006; 19 years ago
- Stable release: 2.1.8 / September 1, 2026; 9 days ago
- Operating system: Windows, macOS, Linux, Android
- License: AGPLv3 (2011 onward), GPLv2 (prior to 2011)
- Website: pokerth.net
- Repository: github.com/pokerth/pokerth

PokerTH is a free and open-source Texas hold 'em poker game available for Windows, macOS, Linux, and Android. It is written primarily in C++ using the Qt framework and supports games with up to ten players. Computer-controlled opponents can be used in local games, while multiplayer games can be played over a local area network or the Internet.

Since 2026, PokerTH has also had a web client that allows the game to be played directly in a web browser and can be installed as a Progressive Web App (PWA).

The project was started in 2006 by Felix Hammer and Florian Thauer. Twenty years later, it remained under active development, with version 2.1.8 released on 1 September 2026.

== History ==
The PokerTH project was started in 2006 by Felix Hammer and Florian Thauer. The project was registered on SourceForge on 13 May 2006.

Version 0.1 was not released to the public and only allowed partial gameplay. Version 0.2 was released on 4 October 2006, followed by version 0.3 on 16 October. By version 0.2, the game could play a complete round.

Version 0.4 was released on 4 April 2007 and included a new interface, an options dialog and reprogrammed computer opponents. In June 2007, version 0.5 added network and online play as well as sound effects. Internationalization also began with version 0.5.

Version 0.6 was released on 13 December 2007. The most prominent change was the addition of a dedicated game server for online play, as well as IPv6 support.

Version 0.7 was released on 3 May 2009, adding support for up to ten players and a new skinnable interface.

Version 0.8 was released on 9 September 2010, adding the option to play online ranking games.

In 2011, PokerTH was relicensed from GPLv2 to the GNU AGPL.

Version 0.9 was released on 4 January 2012 after a year of development and a beta phase. The release introduced the ability for players to rejoin Internet games after a disconnection, along with other new features and bug fixes.

As of version 0.9.5, PokerTH included preliminary support for Android devices.

As of version 1.0, an online log file analysis tool was added, together with sound support and support for higher screen resolutions on Android devices and Windows 8 in desktop mode. The server was refactored using Protocol Buffers, allowing alternative clients to use the PokerTH network protocol.

Version 1.1.2 was released on 1 September 2017.

Development later continued with the 2.x series. In 2026, the project saw a series of new releases and significant changes to its user interfaces.

=== QML client ===
Version 2.1.0, released on 3 July 2026, marked the new QML client as stable. It was distributed alongside the traditional Qt Widgets client.

The QML client subsequently gained features including player statistics and ranking pages, game spectating, additional themes and card sets, chat improvements and other user-interface changes.

Version 2.1.8 was released on 1 September 2026. It introduced a dedicated inbox for private messages in the QML client, with conversations organized by player, as well as redesigned emoji reactions and new table themes. The release also included server-side security and reliability changes and updates to the Android builds.

== Gameplay ==
PokerTH implements the no-limit form of Texas hold 'em using virtual chips.

A game can contain up to ten players. In local games, computer-controlled players can fill empty seats.

PokerTH supports several ways of playing:

- local games against computer-controlled opponents;
- multiplayer games on a local area network;
- connection to a dedicated PokerTH server;
- Internet games against other PokerTH users.

The software includes a range of options for customizing game tables, card decks, card backs, avatars and other elements of the interface.

== Online play ==
PokerTH allows players to connect to Internet game servers and play against other users.

Players can create or join games, including games that contribute to rankings maintained by the PokerTH community.

The PokerTH community also organizes tournaments and competitions, including recurring community events.

== Web client ==
An official PokerTH Web Client was released in July 2026, allowing PokerTH to be played directly from a modern web browser.

The web client connects to the existing PokerTH network rather than operating as a separate game service. It supports Internet play on the PokerTH network, local training against computer-controlled opponents, and connections to LAN or private dedicated servers.

Like the desktop game, the web client supports tables with up to ten players. It is designed for desktop and mobile browsers and can also be installed as a Progressive Web App (PWA).

The web client's source code is publicly available and is distributed under the GNU AGPL v3.

== Development ==
PokerTH is developed primarily in C++ using the Qt framework.

Its source code is publicly available on GitHub, and official releases are distributed through SourceForge and other software distribution systems.

The project includes the poker engine, graphical clients and a dedicated server used to host multiplayer games.

The web client is a separate open-source client compatible with the PokerTH network protocol.

== License ==
PokerTH is free software. The current source code is distributed under the GNU Affero General Public License version 3 or, at the user's option, a later version, with additional permission concerning linking with OpenSSL.

The project had previously been distributed under the GNU GPL, before being relicensed to the AGPL in 2011.

The PokerTH Web Client is also distributed under the GNU AGPL v3 or later.

== Reception ==
PokerTH

Review score
| Publication | Score |
|---|---|
| Softonic | 8/10 |

PokerTH was selected in April 2013 as a "HotPick" by Linux Format.

PokerTH was downloaded more than 2.8 million times from SourceForge between 2007 and May 2017.

Linux Journal commented that "it's a great poker sim for newbies and veterans alike", and noted its fan base.

== See also ==
- List of open-source video games
- Texas hold 'em
- Open-source video game
