= Punto Informatico =

- Frontpage, 7 March 2009
- Website type: Online newspaper
- Available in: Italian
- Owner: Edizioni Master
- Editor: Massimo Mattone
- Website: punto-informatico.it
- Commercial: Yes
- Registration: Optional
- Launched: 1995
- Current status: Active

Punto Informatico (literally "Informatic point", pun for "Informative place") is an Italian online newspaper.

Founded in 1995 and established in 1996, it has been the first Italian daily newspaper published online and one of the most read and influential in Italy. With 1.1 millions of reader per month, the online edition was the third most widely read in Italy as of June 2008, after La Repubblica, Corriere della Sera and La Stampa.

It has a front page and several specific section dedicated to different topics such as "topicality", "technology", "law", "business" and "security". It has also been defined a "source for legal information", because of its interest to legal related topics and expert writers.

Punto Informatico was nominated twice for the Ischia International Journalism Award, in 2009 and 2010.

== People ==
=== Editorial staff ===
- Massimo Sesti (owner, from 2010)
- Andrea De Andreis (owner, 1995/2010)
- Massimo Mattone (editor-in-chief, from 2010)
- Paolo De Andreis (editor-in-chief, 1995/2010)
- Luca Schiavoni (graphic, columnist, 1995/2009)

=== Previous and current columnists ===
- Luca Schiavoni - "Download"
- Massimo Mantellini - "Contrappunti"
- Marco Calamari - "Cassandra Crossing"
- Luca Spinelli - "Puntodivista"
- Dario Bonacina - "Telefonia"
- Alessandro Del Rosso

=== Other writers ===
- Paolo Attivissimo
- Dario d'Elia
- Alfonso Maruccia
- Giulio Fornasar
- Luca Saccomani

== Awards ==
- Beta Logo Awards (Communication), 1999, Beta Magazine
- Premio WWW 2005 (Technology and innovation), Il Sole 24 Ore
- Premio WWW 2006 (Technology and innovation), Il Sole 24 Ore
- Big Brother Awards (Italy) 2010 (positive section), Winston Smith - eroe della Privacy
