= SuperTuxKart =

Arcade racing game, first released in 2007

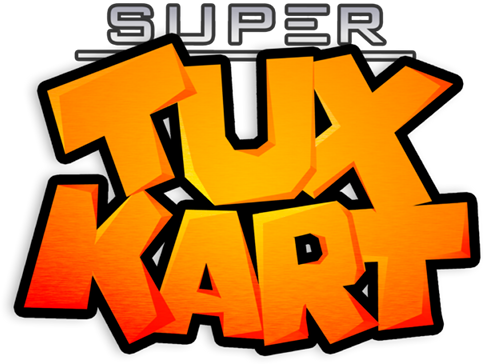
- Developers: Alayan; Sven Andreas Belting ("Sven"); Jean-Manuel Clemençon ("Samuncle")
- Publisher: SuperTuxKart Team
- Programmer: Joerg Henrichs ("Hiker")
- Series: SuperTux
- Engine: Irrlicht; Antarctica (modified fork of Irrlicht used since v0.9)
- Platforms: Linux, macOS, Microsoft Windows, Android, iOS (beta), Nintendo Switch
- Release: 6 August 2007 (19 years ago)
- Genre: Racing
- Modes: Single-player, Multiplayer

SuperTuxKart (STK) is a free and open-source kart racing game, distributed under the terms of the GNU General Public License, version 3. Its initial version was released in 2007. It features mascots of various open-source projects. SuperTuxKart is cross-platform, running on Linux, macOS, Windows, iOS (beta), Android systems and Nintendo Switch (homebrew).

SuperTuxKart started as a fork of TuxKart, originally developed by Steve and Oliver Baker in 2000. When TuxKart development ended around March 2004, a fork as SuperTuxKart was conducted by other developers in 2006. SuperTuxKart is still under major active development by the game's community.

== Gameplay ==
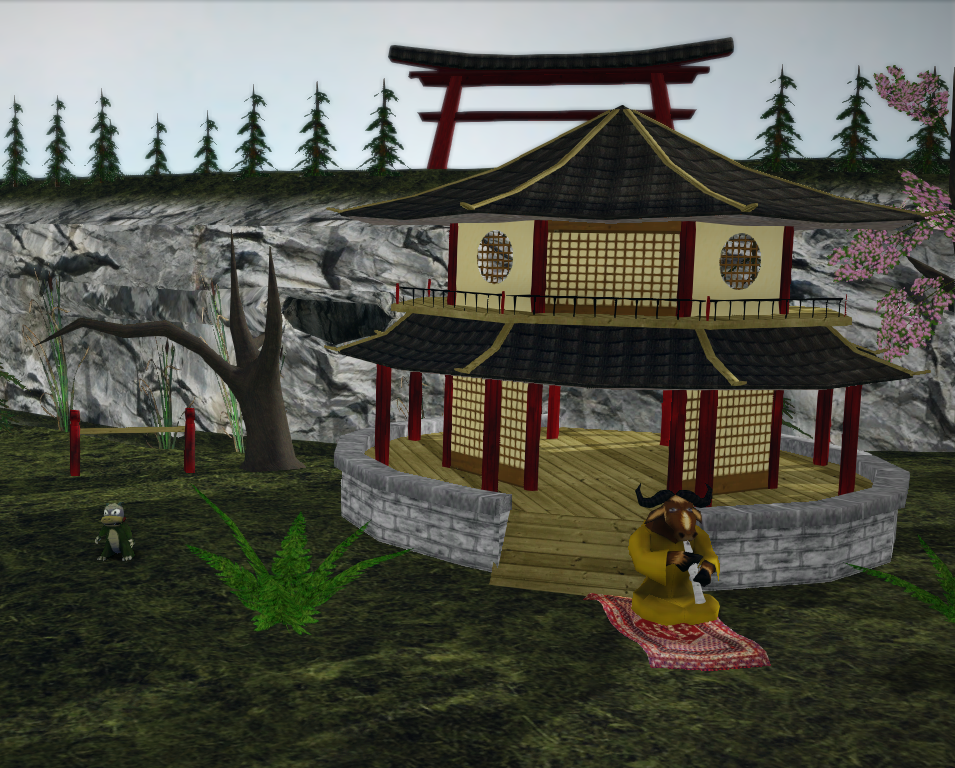
Gnu and Nolok in the beginning cut-scene of Story Mode in STK

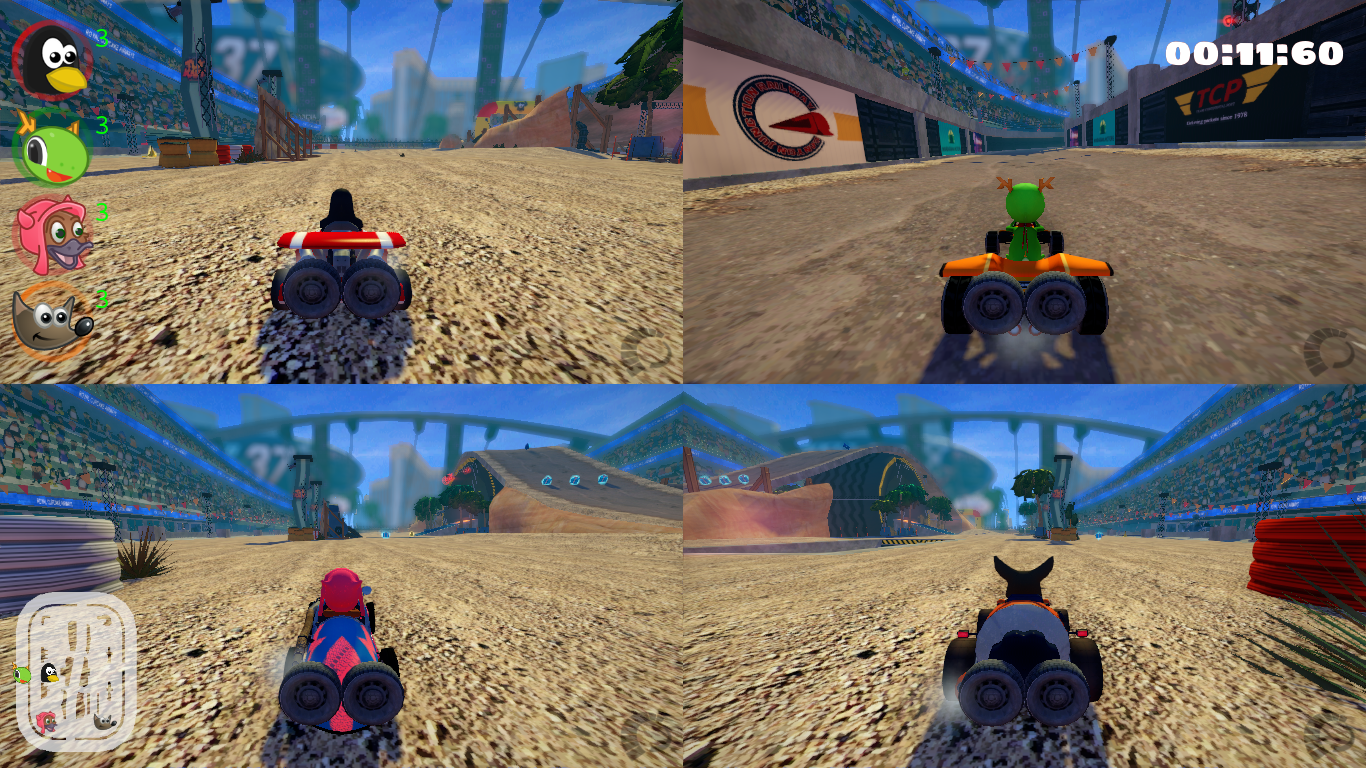
Split-screen 4-player multiplayer in SuperTuxKart (2017, 0.9.3)

SuperTuxKart is similar to the Mario Kart series, but also has differentiating elements, such as collecting and using cans of Nitro and the use of presents and bananas on tracks. The game features the mascots of several open source projects. For example, Gnu, mascot of the GNU Project, who serves as the character kidnapped by the villain Nolok. The game supports single player, local multiplayer, WAN multiplayer, and LAN multiplayer modes. Networking modes were introduced in version 1.0.

=== Plot ===
Unlike Mario Kart, STK has a story associated with gameplay, similar to Crash Team Racing. "Story mode" in STK is used to unlock tracks and characters for single and multi-player modes. At the beginning of story mode, Gnu, the leader of the free/libre and open-source world, is captured by Nolok, the villain in STK, with his spaceship. Nolok then visits Tux and tells him that he has kidnapped Gnu; unless Tux and his friends can defeat Nolok, the 'King of the Karts', Gnu would become the meal for his next supper. After the player defeats Nolok in Fort Magma, the final track of STK, Tux helps Gnu escape from his prison.

=== Characters ===
The official playable characters of SuperTuxKart are the mascots of free and open-source projects. The character Nolok does not represent a particular open source project, but was created by the SuperTux project as the antagonist of Tux. Some other mascots from other projects are available as add-ons from SuperTuxKart "add-ons" website.

The characters available in the base game are:

- Tux, a penguin, the mascot of Linux who appears as the protagonist
- Nolok, an evil dragon from the game SuperTux, main antagonist
- Gnu, a gnu based on the mascot of the GNU Project who rides a flying carpet
- Adiumy, a duck, mascot of the instant messaging client Adium
- Amanda, a panda, mascot of the window manager Window Maker
- Emule, a mule, mascot of the file sharing app eMule
- Gavroche, a goblin, mascot of media hosting system MediaGoblin
- Godette, a tech girl and robot, mascot of the game design program Godot
- Hexley, a platypus, mascot of Darwin
- Kiki, a squirrel, mascot of the art program Krita
- Konqi, an Asian dragon, mascot of the KDE project
- Pepper, a witch, from the webcomic Pepper&Carrot, who rides a broomstick
- Pidgin, a pigeon, mascot of the chat service Pidgin
- Puffy, a pufferfish, mascot of the OpenBSD project
- Sara, a princess, mascot of the website OpenGameArt
- Suzanne, a chimp, mascot of Blender
- Wilber, a dog like creature called a "gimp", mascot of the image editing tool GIMP
- Xue, a mouse, mascot of Xfce, who drives a hovercraft

Over the years, several characters have been removed or replaced due to licensing issues or the lack of available designers, such as Beastie, mascot of FreeBSD, and Elephpant, mascot of PHP.

== History ==
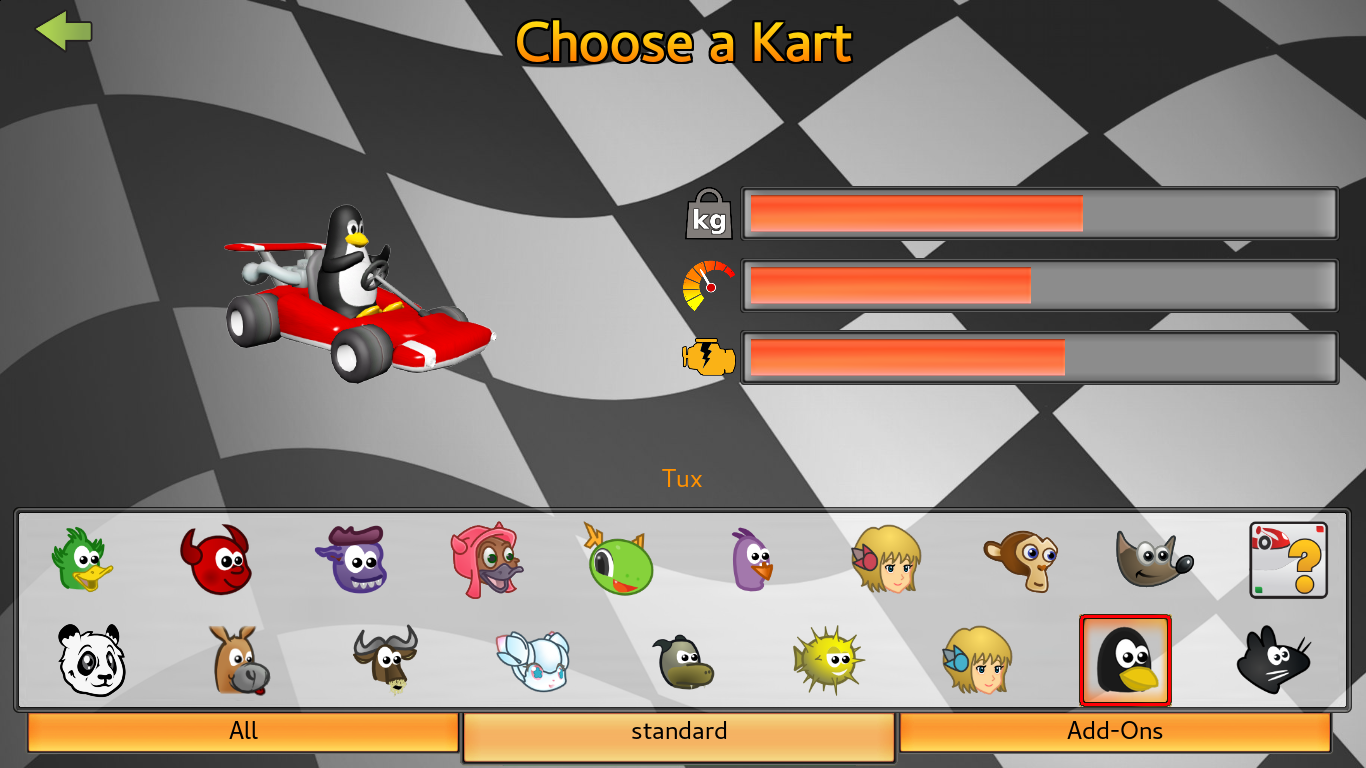
Screenshot showing character selection screen (2018)

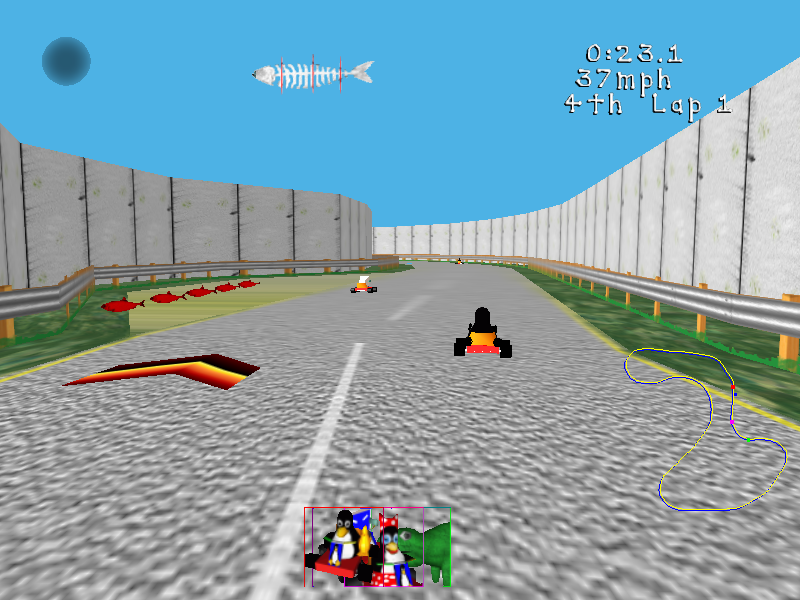
TuxKart - Tux Tollway, from version 0.4

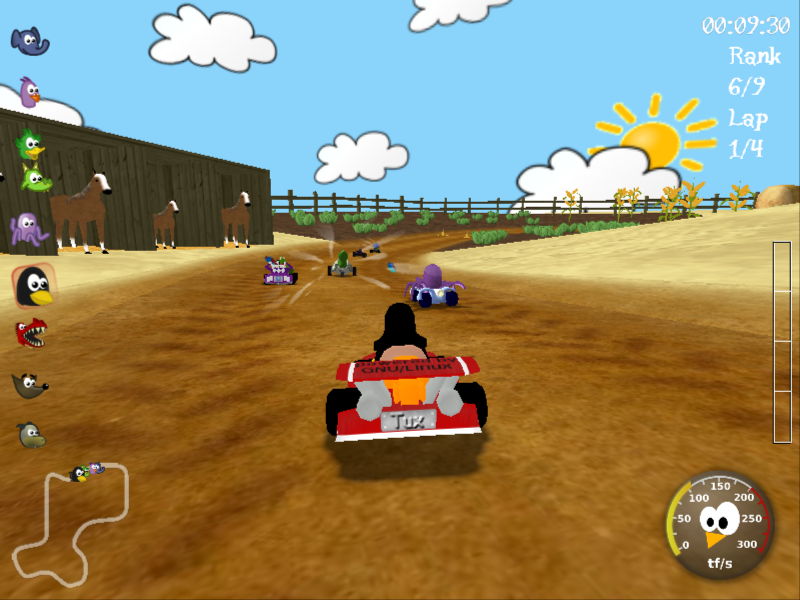
SuperTuxKart 0.7, the first version to use the Irrlicht Engine

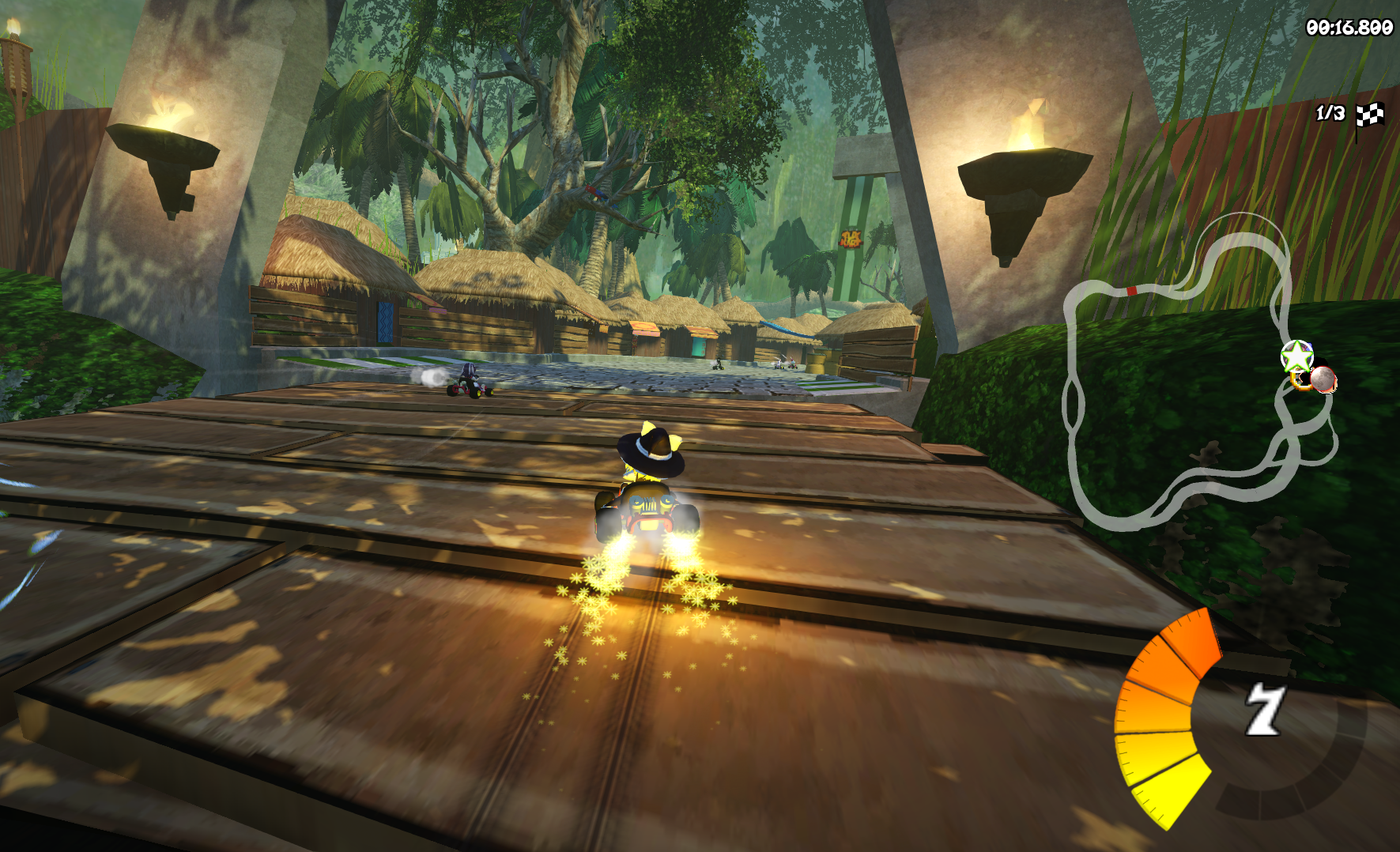
A game session with custom characters from games such as Pizza Tower, Bomberman and Touhou Project

SuperTuxKart is based on TuxKart, a project initiated by Steve Baker in April 2000 for his son Oliver Baker, who also helped design several of the racing tracks. The game used utilizing PLIB, a custom graphics library that Steve Baker had created himself. TuxKart saw its final release in March 2004, though by that point the project had spent several years in maintenance mode, with updates primarily focused on keeping it compatible with newer libraries and compilers.

Due to internal disagreements in the TuxKart project, development stalled. The project ultimately collapsed and was cancelled in March 2004. The project was then forked as SuperTuxKart, but remained in an unplayable and unmaintained state.

In June 2004, the Game of the Month (GotM) project based from the Linux Game Tome chose to improve TuxKart. Steve Baker was initially supportive of this community effort; however, the project went off-rails due to code quality and the lack of communication, leaving the game unplayable for over a year.

In December 2004, with the original maintainer showing zero interest in salvaging the troubled GotM changes and development completely stalled, the remaining contributors chose to preserve the currect state of the project in a fork called ‘SuperTuxKart’. TuxKart was later restored to its previous state.

In 2006, Joerg "Hiker" Henrichs resurrected the project, fixing many of the bugs and performance issues that had rendered the game unplayable. With the help of Eduardo "Coz" Hernandez Munoz, they released their first public release in a playable state. Later, in 2008, Marianne Gagnon (aka, "Auria") joined the project and eventually replaced Coz as one of the project leaders after his retirement.

Historically licensed under version 2 of the GPL, in 2008 the game's source code was relicensed to the GPLv3. The game's assets (textures, models, sounds, music, etc.) are licensed under a mixture of free content and DFSG conforming licenses: GPL, CC BY, CC BY-SA, and Public Domain.

During the first versions of the game, it had relied on PLIB for its graphics. However, the library had received no update since early 2008, and its capabilities were falling increasingly short of modern graphics card features. In 2010, during SuperTuxKart 0.7, they switched away from using SDL and PLIB libraries for graphics and started using the Irrlicht Engine for better game graphics and experience. Upon the release of version 0.7.2, an online add-on section was introduced, allowing players to safely download community made karts and tracks directly within the game, avoiding unreliable external sources and making it the first kart racing game to feature built-in add-on support.

In 2013 and 2014, the game participated in Google Summer of Code as a mentoring organization. The migration of the code repository from SourceForge to GitHub was officially announced in January 2014, though the assets repository and downloads remain on SourceForge.

In April 2015, version 0.9 was released which used a highly modified version of Irrlicht, including an entirely new graphics renderer dubbed Antarctica. This enabled much better graphics with features such as dynamic lighting, ambient occlusion, depth of field, real-time shadow mapping, and more. In 2016, Benau joined the team during the development of version 0.9.2 and introduced AI for Soccer and Battle modes, allowing players to enjoy these modes in single-player against computer opponents.

In March 2017, SuperTuxKart was greenlit on the digital distributor platform Steam, but as of July 2023, SuperTuxKart is not yet downloadable on Steam.

In early 2018, During the development of version 1.0, which was one of the most advanced releases in the game's history, many changes were made. Online multiplayer was added, requiring thousands of lines of code led primarily by Hiker and Benau, along with many bug fixes. Plus, the Antarctica engine switched to using PBR in the git version of the game. Antarctica Rendering Engine uses OpenGL 3.3+ (or OpenGL ES on suitable platforms) and GLSL for most of the graphical work. During this time, future lead devloper Alayan joined the team and began contributing intensively; while bugfixes and UI improvements was a large part of his work in the lead-up to version 1.0, improving gameplay was his primary motivation.

In May 2019, Joerg "Hiker" Henrichs stepped down as a lead developer of SuperTuxKart, with the developers "Benau" and "Alayan" taking over as the new project leaders. During his departure, Auria also stepped away after many years of heavy contribution.

During the releases of versions 1.1 to 1.4, SuperTuxKart received numerous bug fixes, newer kart designs, network enhancements, new arenas, and UI improvements. Notably, version 1.3 introduced support for force feedback, a feature that is extremely uncommon for free and open-source games.

In August 2025, Alayan announced the project was entering a new development phase, titled SuperTuxKart Evolution (version 2.0), to bring new content and improvements. Co-leader "Benau" and minor contributor "Devee" were removed from the STK organization due to internal disagreements causing development of version 1.5 to stagnate. As part of the change in leadership, STK Evolution is currently under a new website and new forum, with ongoing efforts to replace lost resources such as the official domain name, YouTube channel, email address, donation link, social links, and distribution of STK on the Google Play store.

As of September 2025, important resources were transferred and the conflict between the contributors was resolved. The release of 1.5 is planned as a joint release with full cooperation.

In October 2025, SuperTuxKart 1.5 was released, setting the stage for the next version(s) of the game, SuperTuxKart Evolution.

The development of SuperTuxKart Evolution is led by Alayan, with lead artist Sven contributing several track updates and Samuncle helping to shape and promote the project, alongside numerous other contributors assisting with character designs and bug fixes.

On October 6, 2026, the SuperTuxKart team released a preview of a new spin-off game titled SuperTuxZero. It is a text-based adventure game designed to lay the foundation for the story mode of SuperTuxKart Evolution.

== Reception ==
In 2004, TuxKart was selected by The Linux Game Tome to be their "Game of the Month" project. In 2007 Full Circle magazine named SuperTuxKart as one of the top five racing games available for Linux, describing it as a game for gamers who are tired of realistic driving. Linux Journal also praised the game, saying that the courses in SuperTuxKart are "fun", "colorful" and "imaginative". Although it did not make it into the APC Mag top five free games, it received an honorable mention in 2008. In 2009, TechRadar cited it as one of the best games to put on a Linux netbook. In 2016, OMG! Ubuntu! called SuperTuxKart "the best kart racing game to not feature Mario, Toad or Diddy Kong".

Since August 2007 SuperTuxKart has been downloaded over 3.6 million times from SourceForge.net and has over 1 million downloads on the Google Play store.

== See also ==
- List of computing mascots
- List of free and open-source software packages
- List of open-source video games
- SuperTux, another game featuring Tux and friends
- Tux Racer, another racing game that features Tux
- Sonic Robo Blast 2 Kart
