= Globulation 2 =

2009 video game

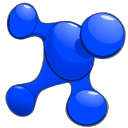
- Developer: Globulation 2 Team
- Platform: Cross-platform
- Release: 2 February 2009
- Genre: Real-time strategy
- Modes: Single player, Multiplayer

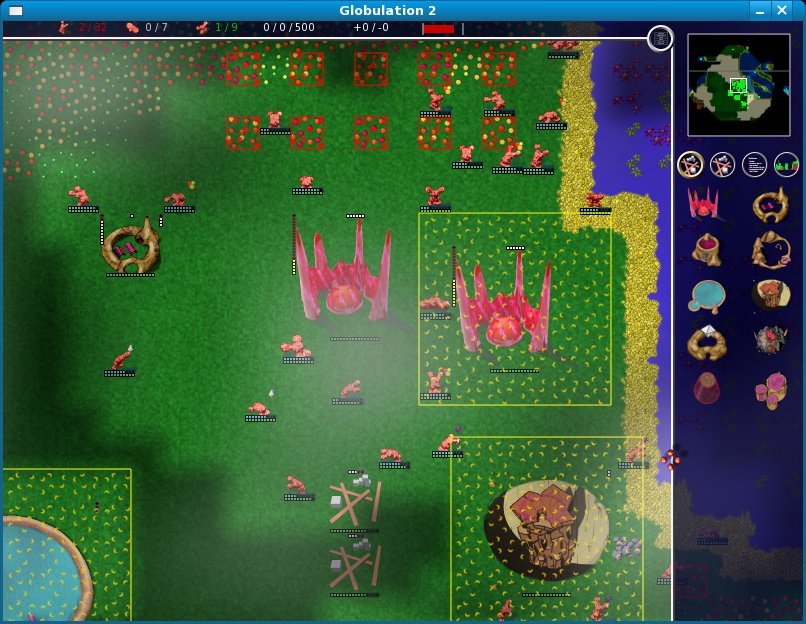
A building camp in Globulation 2

Globulation 2 is a real-time strategy game, available in beta as of January 2009. The game updates on an irregular release cycle and is available in many Linux distribution's package repositories. The game minimizes gaming micromanagement by automatically assigning tasks to units. The game is developed as free and open source software under the GNU GPL-3.0-or-later.

== Gameplay ==
In Globulation, the point is to either kill all of the enemies' units, to convert all of them to the player's side, or to kill the enemy by stealing their resources. The game can be played by a single player, through a local area network (LAN), or through the Internet via Ysagoon Online Game (YOG), a meta-server. It also features AI for playing with computer teams, a scripting language for versatile gameplay or tutorials and an integrated map editor.

== Reception and impact ==
Globulation 2 was rated 5 stars (out of 5) on The Linux Game Tome gaming news website. The game was ported cross-platform (Linux distributions, BSD Unix, GNU Hurd, Apple Mac OS, Microsoft Windows, etc.) and included in several major free operating system distributions such as Debian and Ubuntu.

== See also ==
- List of open source games
