= Tux Droid =

Programmable Tux figure

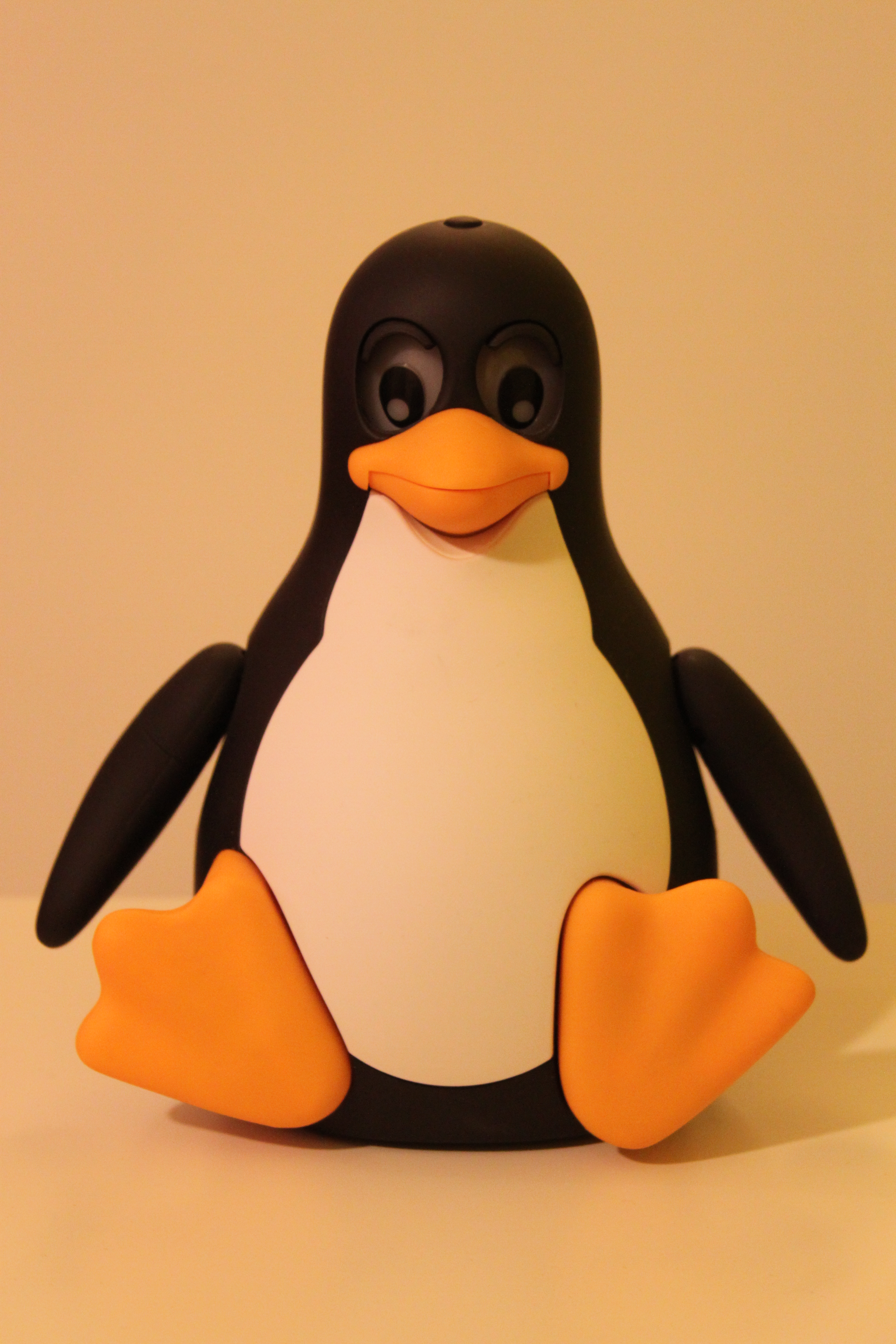
The Tux Droid

Tux Droid is a wireless robotic penguin figure based on the Linux mascot, Tux, released around 2007. It was manufactured by a company named KYSOH.

== Description ==
The Tux Droid measures 210mm × 180mm × 140mm with lowered wings. It supports Linux kernel 2.4 or later and needs an 800 MHz CPU and 128 MB RAM. Communication from Tux Droid to the computer is via signaling operating in the 802.11 WLAN band, but not compatible with Wi-Fi. The Tux Droid receives signals from a plastic fish-shaped USB receiver. An infrared remote control is supplied; signals from this are received by Tux Droid and sent to the host software over the wireless link. It needs an internet connection for media detection. The mascot is driven by Atmel AVR RISC microcontrollers. The Tux Droid only supports Linux computers.

== Functions ==
The Tux Droid can spin around, flap its wings, and light up its eyes. It came with bundled open source software to customize its functionality. It can announce events by its gestures such as dancing, flapping, and spinning, and by ALSA driven sound. The events are detected by specific gadgets, which are handled by the Tux Gadget Manager.

== Reception ==
The Tux Droid received positive reviews for its functionality, the open source software, and its humor and novelty value. Some reviewers did note the high asking price at the time, at £89.95, and that the software only worked on Linux.

== See also ==
- Speech synthesis
- List of computing mascots
