= Tux (mascot) =

Mascot of Linux

- Linux character
- Tux, here in a vector image conversion but originally drawn as a raster image by Larry Ewing in 1996
- First appearance: 9 May 1996; 30 years ago
- Created by: Larry Ewing

In-universe information
- Nickname: Linux
- Species: Penguin

Tux is a penguin character and the official mascot of the Linux kernel. Originally created as an entry to a Linux logo competition, Tux is the most commonly used icon for Linux, although different Linux distributions depict Tux in various styles. The character is used in many other Linux programs and as a general symbol of Linux.

== History ==
The concept of the Linux brand character being a penguin came from Linus Torvalds, the creator of Linux. According to Jeff Ayers, Linus Torvalds had a "fixation for flightless, fat waterfowl" and Torvalds claims to have contracted "penguinitis" after being nibbled by a little penguin on a visit to the National Zoo & Aquarium in Canberra, Australia, in 1993.

Linus spoke at the 1994 AUUG Conference (5–9 Sept, Melbourne) as part of a "World Tour" to Belgium, Australia, Singapore and elsewhere, mentioning in Linux Journal he was bitten by a penguin at Canberra Zoo, not at Phillip Island, Victoria, by a (shy) wild penguin.

In an interview Linus commented on the penguin bite:

I've been to Australia several times, these days mostly for Linux.Conf.Au. But my first trip—and the one when I was bitten by a ferocious fairy penguin: you really should keep those things locked up!—was in 93 or so, talking about Linux for the Australian Unix Users Group.

At Canberra zoo, a sign said in 2009 that staff believed the "original Tux" was still resident in the penguin enclosure.

Apart from this, in the book Just for Fun: The Story of an Accidental Revolutionary, there is an excerpt dedicated to how Tux became the mascot of the Linux kernel. In the book, Linus says he does not remember how Tux became the mascot, but believes the zoo story, which, according to his wife, Tove Torvalds, is probably right.

The story, according to Linus, is that while Tove may in fact have vaguely mentioned penguins at some early stage, it was in a conversation with two high-ranking Linux types that the icy creatures were first seriously considered as the operating system's official mascot.

In 1996, after an initial design suggestion made by Alan Cox, an image Torvalds found on an FTP site, showed a penguin figurine depicted in a similar style to the Creature Comforts characters created by Nick Park, the concept for Tux was further refined by Torvalds on the Linux kernel mailing list.

Linus Torvalds' "favourite penguin picture", used as inspiration for Tux

Torvalds was looking for something fun and sympathetic to associate with Linux, and he felt that a slightly fat penguin sitting down after having eaten a great meal perfectly fit the bill.

Confronted with further criticism about the choice, he wrote in a message "Some people have told me they don’t think a fat penguin really embodies the grace of Linux, which just tells me they have never seen an angry penguin charging at them in excess of 100 mph. They’d be a lot more careful about what they say if they had."

The final and original design was a submission for a Linux logo contest by Larry Ewing using the first publicly released version (0.54) of GIMP, a free software graphics package. It was released by him under the following condition:

Permission to use and/or modify this image is granted provided you acknowledge me lewing@isc.tamu.edu and The GIMP if someone asks.

Since Tux won none of the three competitions that were held, Tux is formally known as the Linux brand character and not the logo.

The first person to call the penguin "Tux" was James Hughes, who said that it stood for "(T)orvalds (U)ni(X)". However, tux is also an abbreviation of tuxedo, the outfit which bears resemblance in appearance to a penguin.

=== Tuz 2009 ===
Tuz, the Tasmanian devil (2009)

Tuz, a Tasmanian devil wearing a fake penguin beak, was the brand character of the 2009 linux.conf.au conference. It has been chosen by Linus Torvalds as the logo for version 2.6.29 of the Linux kernel to support the effort to save the Tasmanian devil species from extinction due to the devil facial tumour disease.

The image was designed by Andrew McGown and recreated as an SVG using Inkscape by Josh Bush, and released under the CC BY-SA license.

=== Linux for Workgroups 2013 ===
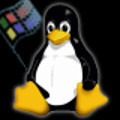
Tux logo in the "Linux for Workgroups" release (2013)

For the Linux 3.11-rc1 release, Linus Torvalds changed the code name from "Unicycling Gorilla" to "Linux for Workgroups" and modified the logo that some systems display when booting to depict a Tux holding a flag with a symbol that is reminiscent of the logo of Windows for Workgroups 3.11, which was released in 1993.

== Uses and reception ==
In some Linux distributions, for example Gentoo, Tux greets the user during booting with multi-processor systems displaying multiple images of Tux, one for each processor core.

=== Video games ===
Tux has taken on a role in the Linux community similar to that which Mario holds in the Nintendo community. The character has been featured in open-source look-alikes of other mainstream games, such as Tux Racer, Extreme Tux Racer, SuperTux, SuperTuxKart, Tux Typing and Tux Paint.

==== Team Fortress 2 ====
Tux appears as a cosmetic item in the game Team Fortress 2, following the release of the Linux version of the game and the Steam client. It was obtainable by launching the game on any Linux distribution, from 14 February to 1 March 2013.

==== Female Tux versions in video games ====
Some games that star Tux also include explicitly female penguin characters, allowing the players to play as one of those characters instead of Tux. One such female penguin is Tux's friend "Gown". Gown is variously depicted as being a pink version of Tux (XTux) or as having a somewhat less fat appearance and wearing items of clothing such as a red and white short skirt and a hair bow (e.g. TuxKart and A Quest for Herring).

In SuperTux and SuperTuxKart, there is a different female penguin called "Penny" who is purple and white (SuperTuxKart once had Gown and still has a map called "Gown's Bow"). In the arcade game Tux 2 there is a female penguin called "Trixi", and in FreeCiv the female leader name for the Antarctican civilization is "Tuxette".

=== Tux in popular culture ===
- In the comics Hellblazer, in issue #234 "Joyride, part 1", a Tux plush toy makes an appearance, set on the side of the road where a little girl was killed in a hit-and-run incident.
- Tux appeared as a character during one arc in the webcomic User Friendly.

=== Other uses ===
- In 1999, Corel Linux Deluxe included a free Linux Penguin (Tux) toy.
- Introduced in 2001, there was a Linux-based web server named TUX, which was deprecated around 2006.
- In 2006, Tux had an uncredited use in the Al Gore's Penguin Army video.
- In 2007, Tux was used by the German cutlery producer WMF in the Sealion set for children.
- In 2008, Tux had been made as a virtual pet under the name Tux Droid by Kysoh for Linux, it has many features including reading tweets from Twitter and checking the weather.
- Since 2009, TuxGuitar, a free guitar tab reading/editing program, features Tux holding a guitar as its brand character.
- In 2010, a prototype of a Tux monument with wings was presented in the Russian city of Tyumen by the local Linux user community.
- The avatar of Electronica artist Ephixa is based on Tux (around 2011).
- In April 2016, Tux was adapted to a designer toy called a Gwin and was distributed by October Toys. The toy was redesigned by different artists and sold in short collectible runs through the October Toys website and other collectable vinyl toy sites. October Toys has since ceased operations.

== See also ==
- List of computing mascots
- BSD Daemon, the mascot of various BSD releases
- Glenda, the Plan 9 Bunny, the mascot of Plan 9 from Bell Labs
- Kiki the Cyber Squirrel, the mascot of Krita
- Konqi, the mascot of KDE
- Mozilla (mascot), the mascot of Mozilla Foundation
- Puffy (mascot), the mascot of OpenBSD
- Tux Droid
- Wilber (mascot), the mascot of GIMP
