= Larry Ewing =

American computer programmer

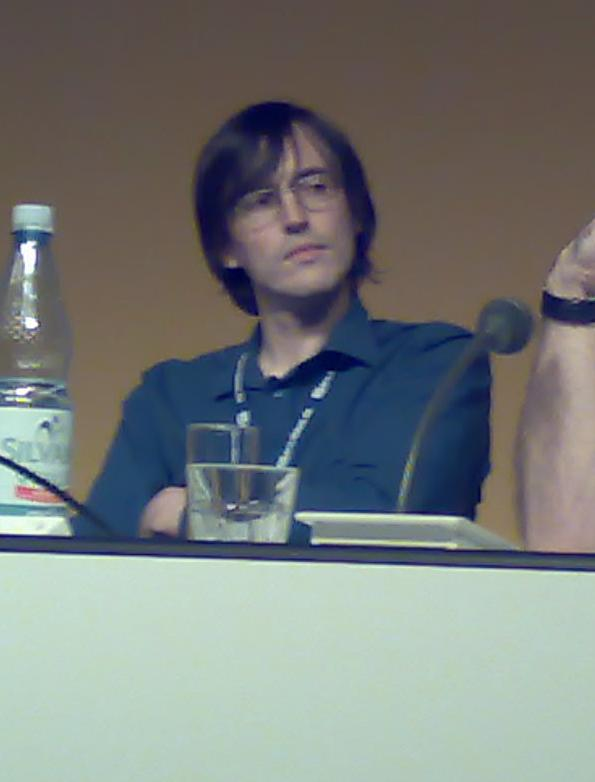
- Larry Ewing at LinuxTag 2007 in Berlin
- Education: Texas A&M University
- Occupation: Image designer
- Spouse: Kristy Anderson
- Children: Eva Ewing, Hazel Ewing

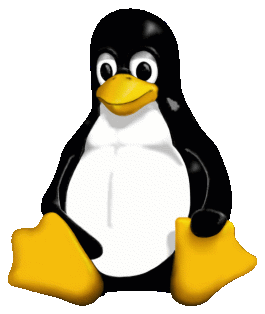
Tux, the Linux mascot

Larry Ewing is an American computer programmer who is known as the creator of the Linux mascot, Tux. The artwork was created in 1996, while Ewing was a student at Texas A&M University, originally as a submission for a contest to create the Linux logo. Though Ewing's submission didn't win, his artwork was adopted as the Linux "brand character". Ewing also created the Ximian and Mono monkey logos and is involved in:

- F-Spot: a project aiming to "manage all your digital photography needs."
- GtkHTML: a fast HTML renderer and editor used in several free software projects.
- Novell Evolution: a mailer, a calendar and a contact manager, all in one.
- GIMP: an image manipulation program.
- Moonlight: an open source implementation of Silverlight for Unix systems.
- Mimekit: A C# MIME creation and parser library with support for S/MIME, PGP, TNEF and Unix mbox spools.
- .NET Foundation: an independent organization, incorporated to improve open-source software development and collaboration around the .NET Framework.

He lives in Austin with his wife Kristy and their two daughters.
