= Freedom Planet 2 =

2022 video game

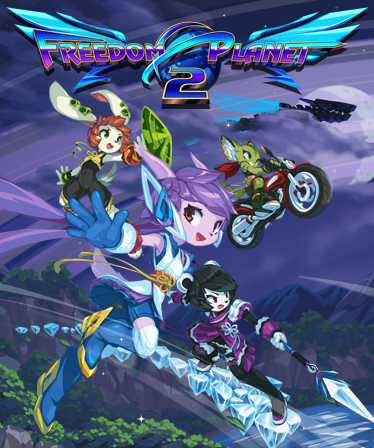
- Developer: GalaxyTrail
- Publishers: GalaxyTrail; Xseed Games (consoles)
- Director: Sabrina DiDuro
- Producers: Sabrina DiDuro; Dawn M. Bennett
- Designers: Sabrina DiDuro; Edwyn Tiong
- Programmers: Sabrina DiDuro; Christian Whitehead; Will Bowerman; Alexander Zung; Arrietty DeChabert; Dmitrii Altukhov; Noah Joseph Hall
- Writers: Sabrina DiDuro; Edwyn Tiong; Andrew Chen (based on Sonic the Hedgehog by Yuji Naka, Naoto Ohshima, and Hirokazu Yasuhara)
- Composers: Sabrina DiDuro; Will Bowerman; Leilani Wilson; Jason Lord; Nicole Frische
- Series: Freedom Planet
- Engine: Unity
- Platforms: Windows; Nintendo Switch; PlayStation 4; PlayStation 5; Xbox One; Xbox Series X/S
- Release: Windows: WW: September 13, 2022; Switch, PS4, PS5, Xbox One, Series X/S: WW: April 4, 2024
- Genre: Platform
- Mode: Single-player

Freedom Planet 2 is an indie platform video game developed and published by GalaxyTrail for Windows, and published by Xseed Games on home consoles. It is the sequel to Freedom Planet, originally developed as a Sonic the Hedgehog fangame. It was released for Windows on September 13, 2022, which was followed by ports on Nintendo Switch, PlayStation 4, PlayStation 5, Xbox One, and Xbox Series X/S on April 4, 2024. Like its predecessor, it is inspired by Sega Genesis games. It follows the three-person cast of the original game and new playable panda character Neera Li (who was previously introduced in Freedom Planet as a side character) as they fight the robotic army of Merga, a water dragoness who seeks revenge for ancient atrocities.

Critics called Freedom Planet 2 a general improvement over the first game in the series, and also noted how it became less similar to the Sonic series and adopted its own unique graphical and gameplay style.

== Gameplay ==
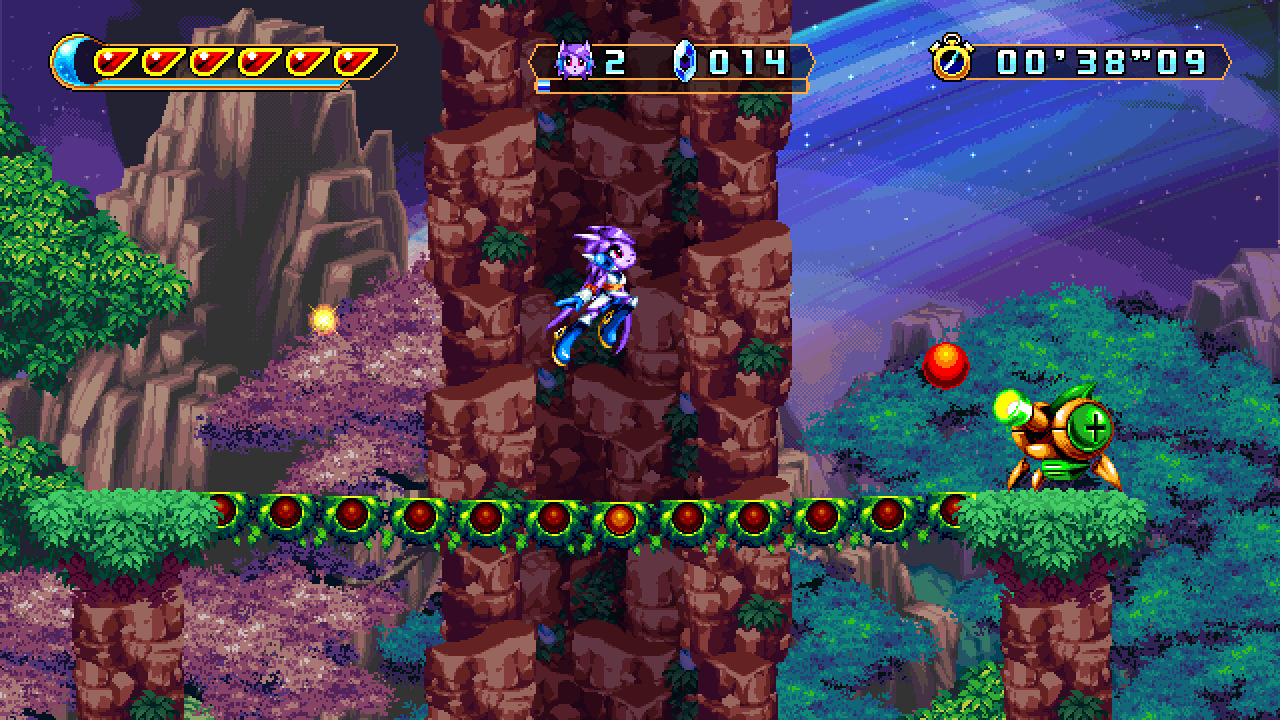
The character Lilac dodges an enemy projectile.

Freedom Planet 2 is a 2D platform game. The player quickly navigates through stages with multiple routes to defeat a boss at the end. Unlike the first game, there are no minibosses or second phases to levels. The player can run, jump and use attacks to defeat enemies, as well as guard to briefly negate incoming damage. By building up speed, players can run up ramps, through loop-de-loops and grind on rails. The game design and visuals have been compared to Sega Saturn games.

Each of the four playable characters has their own unique abilities, some of which are regulated by an energy meter. Lilac can use her hair as a whip or for a spinning Cyclone attack that hits rapidly while slowing her descent. Her special move, the Dragon Boost, is a powerful six-directional dash attack that makes her invincible and can now be performed after the Cyclone. She can also perform a short-range Blink Dash after guarding. Carol can wall jump, attack with her claws or throw her boomerang-like Jump Disc, which she can then leap towards from any direction. Finding gas canisters allows her to ride her motorcycle, which accelerates much quicker and can climb walls. Milla can briefly fly with her ears to reach high places and use an energy shield to deflect attacks. She can also summon Phantom Cubes that can be rapidly shot as projectiles or used for the powerful Super Shield Burst that propels her in the opposite direction. The new playable character, Neera Li, focuses on melee attacks and long-range Frost Arts that deal great damage. By guarding, she can enter a Focus State that increases her attack speed.

The player begins every level with three stocks and can earn more by collecting crystals. When their health is depleted, they lose a stock and can choose to either return to the previous checkpoint at full health or revive on the spot with no health. If all stocks are lost, the player must pay crystals to continue. Items purchased at shops or found in levels can provide benefits to the player, such as regaining health when landing attacks, but reduce the crystal bonus earned at the end of a stage. Conversely, Brave Stones cause negative effects, such as being unable to revive on the spot, while increasing the crystal bonus. At the end of each stage, the player is awarded a rank, which is lowered by taking damage, losing stocks or using items that reduce their crystal bonus.

There are two primary modes: In Adventure mode, players navigate a world map between stages and visit hub areas where they can talk to NPCs and purchase items using crystals and gold gems collected in levels. Classic mode, unlocked after completing Adventure mode, features no cutscenes, no hubs and a simplified map system to streamline play. Outside of stages, the player can take on challenges at the Battlesphere to earn time capsules that reveal more of the game's backstory. Collecting all the time capsules is required to access a secret stage and receive the true ending.

== Synopsis ==
=== Setting and characters ===
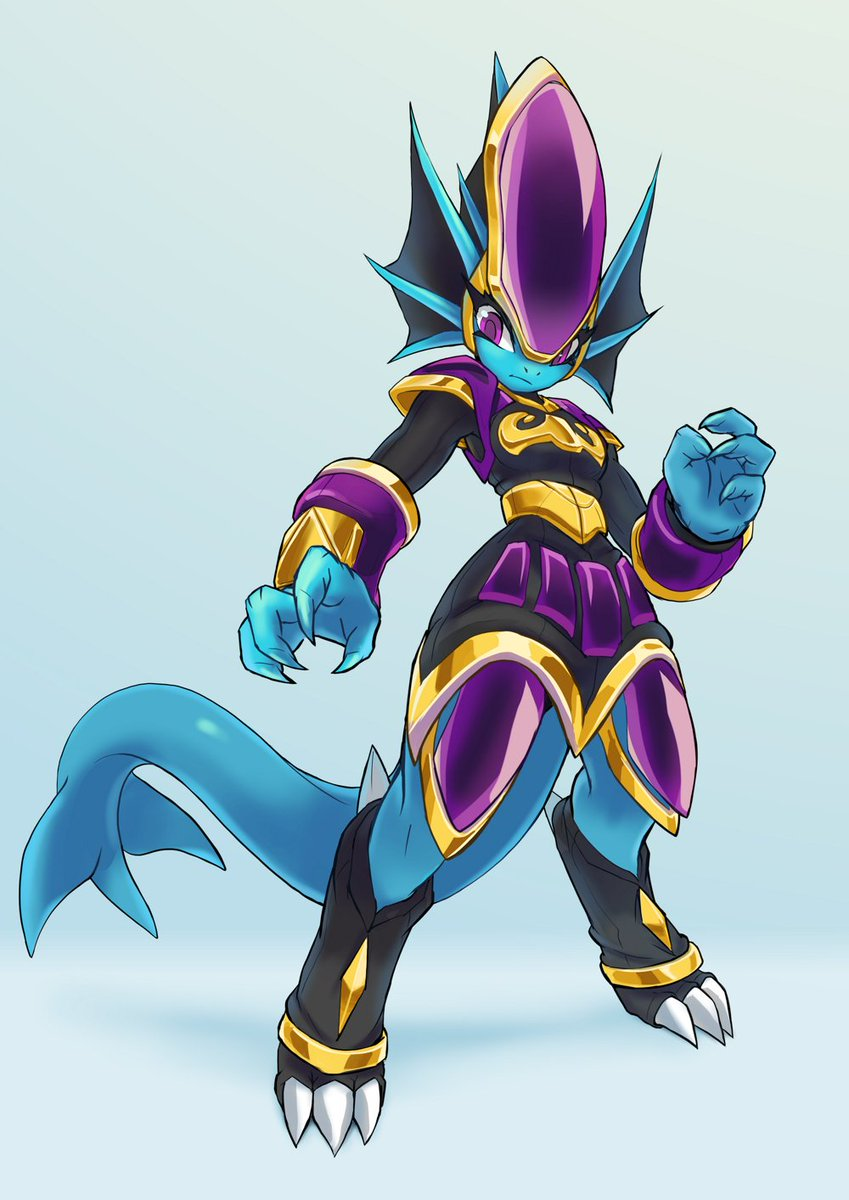
The character Merga is introduced as the new antagonist of Freedom Planet 2.

Freedom Planet 2 is set on the world of Avalice, a planet composed of four kingdoms: Shang Tu, a city once ruled by the earth dragons currently ruled by the Royal Magister; the advanced republic city Shang Mu currently ruled by mayor Zao; the northern kingdom of Shuigang ruled by King Dail; and the southern tropical island nation of Parusa, once home to the ancient water dragons who waged war on Shang Tu.

The main characters are Sash Lilac, thought to be the last water dragon in existence, who fights with her pigtails, Carol Tea, a motorcycle-riding green wildcat, Milla Basset, a basset hound and alchemist who can create phantom cubes and potions (later revealed to be an alien from Brevon's homeworld), and Neera Li, the trusted advisor of the Royal Magister.

The game begins three years after the evil Lord Brevon was defeated and forced to retreat from the planet of Avalice. This has created a temporary peace, but it is abruptly broken by the return of the water dragon warrior Merga, an ancient bioengineered supersoldier of the same species as Lilac, who desires revenge for atrocities committed during Avalice's oldest and deadliest war. Ultimately, the heroes are split between sides and must fight to stop the potentially world-ending superweapon Bakunawa.

=== Plot ===
Lilac and Carol are dealing with a robot attack in Dragon Valley, which results in their house being destroyed. While staying at Milla's place, lieutenant Neera Li summons the three to an audience with the Royal Magister of Shang Tu. The Magister informs them that the recent attacks are seemingly coordinated and requests their assistance in discovering their source. The trio are joined by Neera, who acts as their liaison with the Magister.

Their missions include stopping a sky pirate attack on Shang Tu's museum led by Carol's older sister Corazon and her engineer Aaa to steal the archival drone Pangu, participating in Shang Mu's Battlesphere and recruiting its champion Captain Kalaw, and working with Shang Tu sergeant Askal to defeat General Serpentine and the remnants of Brevon's army in Shuigang, capturing their drone Syntax in the process. The attacks are revealed to be the work of Merga, a water dragon centurion from ancient times who was freed from suspended animation when the Kingdom Stone was destroyed. Merga kidnaps Mayor Zao and demands Pangu in exchange, requiring the drone to activate the ancient spaceship Bakunawa. The heroes try to fool Merga with a disguised Syntax, only to learn that Kalaw, Corazon, Aaa and Askal are in league with Merga, who invades Shang Tu to kill the Magister, revealed to be a young earth dragon. Merga accuses the earth dragons of slaughtering the water dragons, overwhelms the heroes and forces them to retreat.

The group takes refuge with Zao in Shang Mu. The Magister explains that Merga was created during Shang Tu's war with Parusa and was sealed away with the power of the Kingdom Stone. While the Magister searches the library for information about Merga and the water dragons, Carol runs away to Parusa to dissuade Corazon from following Merga, followed by Lilac, Milla and Neera. The heroes resolve numerous crises across the island such as a war between Serpentine's and Aaa's robots over Syntax, defusing explosives planted across the island by Kalaw and thwarting Askal's attempt to detonate the island's volcano. Along the way, the heroes discover time capsules recorded by the earth dragon princess Cordelia, who attempted to create peace between the earth and water dragons, forming a bond with Merga in the process.

Merga leaves Shang Tu and requests to meet with Lilac alone. She explains that the earth dragons were spacefarers who were stranded on Avalice and enslaved their race by turning them to water dragons to build Bakunawa so they could leave the planet. Merga raises Bakunawa, intending to harvest the moon to fuel its spaceflight, which would doom Avalice. The Magister discovers that the test fire of Bakunawa's mining laser killed thousands of water dragons and started the war, in which the earth dragons slaughtered them all while framing them as the warmongers. Serpentine forms a temporary alliance with the heroes so they can stop Bakunawa.

Aboard Bakunawa, the heroes defeat Merga's supporters and convince them to stand down. Serpentine betrays the heroes and reveals Milla as a bioengineered war dog native to Brevon's homeworld in an attempt to seize Bakunawa for himself, but is thwarted. The heroes confront and defeat Merga after failing to convince her to stop. If all of the time capsules are found, Pangu plays a corrupted message of Cordelia wishing Merga happiness. Syntax then seizes control of the ship and attempts to proceed with the moon harvest, but is defeated with Merga's help. As the ship begins to crash, Lilac is injured by debris and is saved by Merga from falling to her death. Due to the revelations, the Magister offers Merga's followers clemency and abdicates from his position to discover Avalice's lost history, leaving Neera as regent until free elections are held. After recovering, Lilac bids Carol farewell and departs to find the missing Merga and learn more about her species.

The post-credit scene shows Cordelia's final message clearly and hints that she may still be alive.

== Development and release ==
In contrast to the original title, Freedom Planet 2 was developed using Unity and has more detailed pixel art than its predecessor. With the goal of "defin[ing] Freedom Planet's identity as a franchise", all characters from the original game received a design overhaul by Tyson Tan, who had previously drawn fan art for the first game. While the early concept artwork on the game's official website remain unchanged, Tan had been experimenting on a new art style with the fans of the game. It was also revealed that Sonic Mania developer Christian Whitehead had helped DiDuro with programming and was responsible for porting over the physics from Clickteam Fusion to Unity. The game was available as a playable demo on Steam since early on in its development. Due to the commercial success of Freedom Planet, its sequel was completely self-funded, without the use of crowdfunding. In an early 2017 gameplay trailer, Neera Li (who was a boss NPC in the first game) was revealed to be the sequel's fourth playable character.

The game was released on September 13, 2022, on Windows. Home console ports were originally set for a mid-2023 launch, but was delayed to December 2023. In August, GalaxyTrail revealed that Xseed Games will be publishing the console versions of their sequel game and that it was still on track for a late 2023 release. However, in mid-December, publisher Xseed Games announced that the game would be delayed once more for an early 2024 release. In January 2024, it was announced that the sequel would release on home consoles on April 4. A Linux version was planned for simultaneous release with the Windows version, but was delayed indefinitely.

== Reception ==
Reception

Aggregate scores
Aggregator	Score
Metacritic	(NS) 80/100 (PS5) 81/100 (Xbox Series X) 79/100
OpenCritic	81% recommend

The Nintendo Switch, PlayStation 5, and Xbox Series X versions of Freedom Planet 2 all received generally favorable reviews, according to the review aggregation website Metacritic. Fellow review aggregator OpenCritic assessed that the game received strong approval, being recommended by 81% of critics. Fellow review aggregator OpenCritic assessed that the game received strong approval, being recommended by 81% of critics.

In pre-release impressions, Chris Moyse of Destructoid said that he liked Freedom Planet 2's visuals and "Saturday morning vibe", calling it "delightful" and "pretty tubular". In a post-release review, Dominic Tarason of PC Gamer described the title as similar to a long-lost Sega Saturn game, noting how much it had evolved away from Sonic the Hedgehog. Calling the game "worth the wait" following its seven-year development, he nevertheless recommended that newcomers start with the first game. Saying that the boss fights were almost all "a joy", he praised the inclusion of a block button and a greater amount of control given to all characters. He noted that the game was forgiving due to its accessibility options, allowing players to greatly reduce or increase the difficulty at will.

Remarking that the cutscenes and story were improved compared to the original game, where they could be "overlong" and with inconsistent voice acting, he praised the new voice acting and the game's setting. Saying that there was "not much to nitpick here", he summed it up as one of his favorite games of 2022.

Robert "Bobinator" Naytor of Hardcore Gaming 101 said that the tone of Freedom Planet 2 was more consistently "cartoony" than the first game, which was infamous for its tonal shift, with Merga still being threatening, but not as dark or murderous as the previous villain, Lord Brevon. Calling the story earnest and its voice acting charming, he nevertheless said that those who did not enjoy the story of the first game would similarly be turned away. Praising the game's combat and level design, he noted that levels were about half as long compared to the original title, calling it a welcome change due to their formerly overlong and fatigue-inducing length. He also enjoyed the game's boss fights against giant enemies, and the addition of a world map that allowed players to revisit previous areas.

Describing Freedom Planet 2 as "truly massive" in scope, he also said that the graphics were overhauled with "real artistic care". He noted that the removal of its "Sonic-esque trappings" helped it stand out on its own. Summing it up as "the best of its kind in a rare few" that were not inspired by Nintendo games, he stated that "whatever flaws the original game have had are mostly gone".
