= List of computing mascots =

List of mascots for computer hardware, software, and concepts

External images
- Original O'Reilly Camel
- Republic of Perl logo

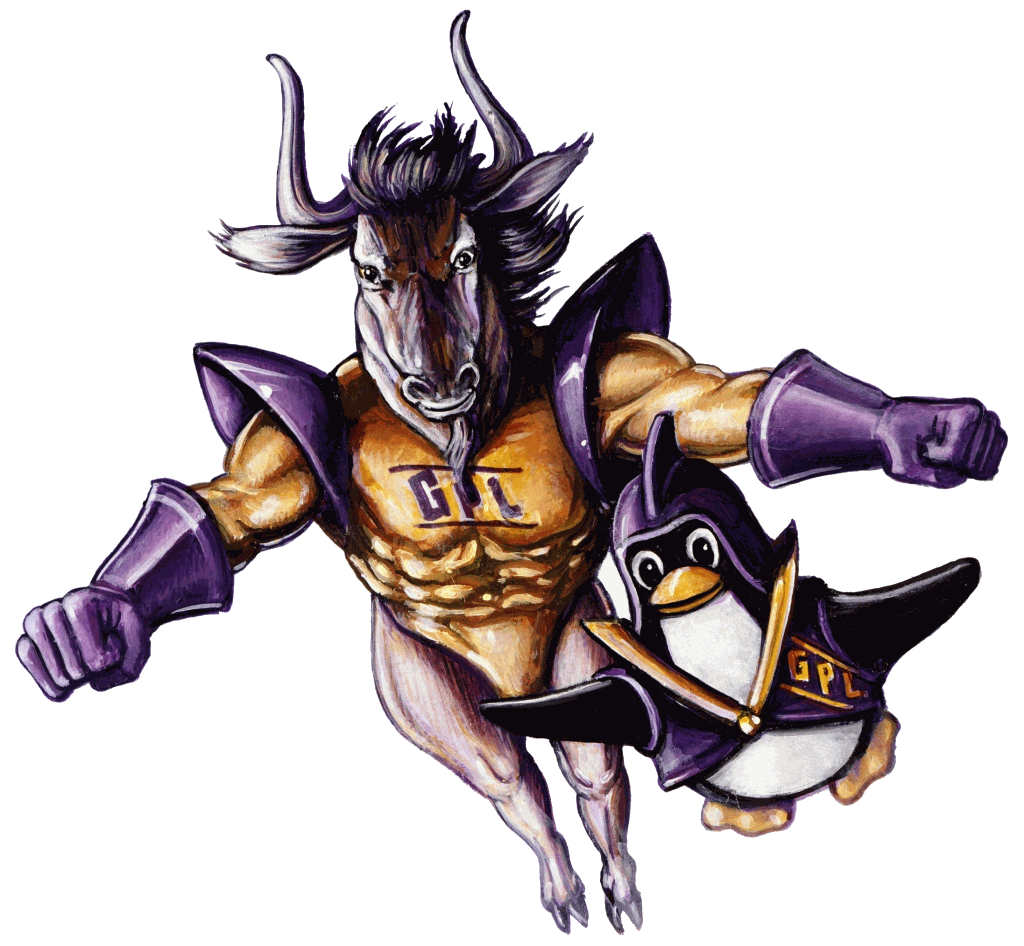
Mascot of GNU, "GNU", with "Tux", the mascot of Linux

This is a list of computing mascots. A mascot is any person, animal, or object thought to bring luck, or anything used to represent a group with a common public identity. In case of computing mascots, they either represent software, hardware, or any project or collective entity behind them.

Within collaborative software projects, the use of mascots often allow for the existence of a non-trademarked symbol for use by the software's community, as opposed to logos and wordmarks, which often have more stringent protections.

List of computing mascots
Mascot	Representing	Description	Image	Ref(s)
Adiumy	Adium, a free and open-source instant messaging client for macOS	A cartoon duck		
Amanda the Panda	Window Maker, a free and open-source window manager for the X Window System	A cartoon panda		
Apache Beam Firefly	Apache Beam	A cartoon firefly		
Apache Pig	Apache Pig	An anthropomorphic pig		
Beanbird	LG's webOS operating system	A dark grey bean shaped bird		
Beastie, the BSD Daemon	BSD, a free and open-source Unix-like operating system with many derivatives	A cartoon demon		
Blinky	FreeDOS, a free and open-source DOS implementation for IBM PC compatible computers	A cartoon fish		
The Bot/Bugdroid (Note: No official name until 2024, when it was named The Bot; before then it was unofficially known as Bugdroid by the Android team.)	Android operating system	A green cartoon android robot		
Buggie	SerenityOS, a free and open-source desktop operating system	A cartoon anthropomorphic ladybug		
Buggie	Bugzilla, a free and open-source web-based general-purpose bugtracker and testing tool	A cartoon anthropomorphic bug		
Camel	Perl, a high-level programming language	A camel		
Camelia	Raku	A cartoon bug with butterfly-like wings		
Canteloupe	Libreboot	The silhouette of an antelope, leaping		
CowDuck	TerminusDB	A cartoon hybrid with the head of a cow and body of a duck		
Dash	Dart language and the Flutter framework	A hummingbird representing Dart as a fast language		
D-Man	D, is a multi-paradigm system programming language.	A letter D anthropomorphized with humanlike limbs and a set of eyes	D-Man	
DotNet Bot (Note: Typically stylized as "dotnet bot" or "dotnet-bot")	.NET free and open source software framework	A purple robot, waving		
Duke	Java, a system for developing application software and deploying it in a cross-platform computing environment	A stylized, unspecified creature		
elePHPant	PHP, a server-side scripting language designed primarily for web development	A cartoon elephant		
eMule	eMule, a free and open-source peer-to-peer file sharing application for Microsoft Windows	A cartoon mule		
Ferris (Note: Unofficial)	Rust language	A cartoon crab		
Freedo	Linux-libre, a free and open-source operating system kernel derived from Linux kernel, packaged by GNU to have all the proprietary components removed	A cartoon anthropomorphic penguin		
Gavroche	GNU MediaGoblin, a free and open-source decentralized server software for hosting and sharing digital media	A cartoon goblin		
Geeko	openSUSE, a Linux-based free and open-source computer operating system family	A stylized chameleon		
Glenda, the Plan 9 Bunny	Plan 9 from Bell Labs, a free and open-source distributed operating system that manages all computing resources through its file system rather than specialized interfaces	A cartoon rabbit		
GNU (Note: or just the drawing "GNU head")	GNU, a free and open-source operating system and an extensive collection of computer software; it is also the mascot of GNU Project, a free-software, mass-collaboration project	An anthropomorphic wildebeest head		
Go Gopher	Go, free and open-source programming language	A cartoon gopher		
Godot Logo; Gbot, Gobot, GDBot; Godette, Sophia; Godot Robot Plush	The mascots associated with the Godot Engine, a free and open-source, cross-platform game engine. The primary symbol is the stylized Godot logo, which serves as the basis for various character designs. These include Gbot (also known as Gobot or GDbot), an anthropomorphic robot with a Godot logo-shaped head, and part of the same mascot line as Godette and Sophia. Godette is an anime-style female mascot inspired by the logo's features, and Sophia is artist Tyson Tan's reinterpretation of Godette in the tradition of OS-tan or anime-tan software mascots. A Godot plush toy, modeled after the logo, exists in both 2D and 3D forms and is often featured in Godot-based games.	A stylized blue robot head with a gear-shaped outline serves as the base design across all variants.	Godot Logo Godette GDBot and Sophia Godot Robot Plush	
Gooey	WebGUI, a free and open-source content management system	A cartoon octopus		
Hexley	Darwin	A cartoon platypus		
Kandalf	Formerly KDE	A cartoon wizard		
Kate the Cyber Woodpecker	Kate, a free and open-source advanced text editor for software developers	A cartoon robotic woodpecker		
Kiki the Cyber Squirrel	Krita, a free and open-source raster graphics editor designed for digital painting and animation	A cartoon anthropomorphic robotic squirrel		
Kit	Mozilla Firefox, a free and open-source web browser	A cartoon Fox, based on the Firefox logo		
Kitty	AROS Research Operating System, a free and open-source multimedia centric implementation of the AmigaOS 3.1 APIs	A cartoon anthropomorphic cat, created by Eric W. Schwartz		
Kodee	Kotlin programming language	A stylized robot		
Konqi (Katie, Kori and KDE dragons)	The primary mascot of KDE, an international community that develops free and open-source software, and KDE Projects, software they have developed, including KDE Plasma workspace, KDE Frameworks, and the software foundation of other KDE Applications. A number of other dragons also exist, such as Katie, associated with KDE Women's Project and KDE dragons, the mascots of KDE Community	Cartoon dragons		
Larry	Gentoo Linux	A cutely drawn cow		
Lenny	Lubuntu	A penguin with blue hair		
The Lisp alien	Lisp	A quadruped alien with more than four eyes and a single arm extending from the nose		
Log Raft	Raft consensus algorithm	A log raft with a face. Created by Andrea Ruygt, and made a vector by Diego Ongaro		
Lucy	Gleam programming language	A pink starfish		
Mastodon	Mastodon	An anthropomorphic, cartoon mastodon.		
Moby Dock	Docker, a set of platform as a service (PaaS) products	A cartoon whale that hauls shipping containers on its back		
Mozilla	Retired mascot of Mozilla Foundation, a non-profit organization that supports and leads Mozilla, a free-software community that developed Firefox, a free and open-source web browser and many related projects	A cartoon anthropomorphic lizard and later a stylized tyrannosaurus rex		
Octocat	GitHub	An anthropomorphized cat with five octopus-like arms		
Pony	Pony programming language	A cartoon pony		
Powershell Hero	Microsoft Powershell 7, Microsoft's open-source shell	A flat shaded humanoid character		
Preston	PrestaShop, a free and open-source e-commerce platform	A puffin		
Puffy	OpenBSD, a free and open-source Unix-like operating system descended from BSD, dedicated to security and stability features	A cartoon pufferfish		
Purple Pidgin	Pidgin, a free and open-source multi-platform instant messaging client	A cartoon pigeon		
Pygame snake	Pygame, a free and open-source Python library for game development	A snake holding a gaming controller		No ref available
Rocky Raccoon	MINIX 3, a free and open-source project to create a small, high availability, high functioning Unix-like operating system	A cartoon raccoon		
Sakila	MySQL	A stylized dolphin		
Sara	OpenGameArt.org	A pixel art girl with blonde hair		
Scratch Cat	Scratch	A cartoon anthropomorphic orange cat (Note: Despite being free software in most cases, the Scratch Cat is not free content)		
Sepia	PeerTube	A cartoon cuttlefish wearing a hat in the shape of the PeerTube logo, designed by David Revoy		
Slonik	Postgresql	A stylised elephant		
Snort Pig	Snort, a free and open-source network intrusion detection and prevention system	A cartoon pig; the "Snort and Pig logo" is a registered trademark of Cisco		
Sudo Sandwich	Sudo	A smiling sandwich; a reference to xkcd #149		
Suzanne	Blender	A monkey head		
Thunderbird	Mozilla Thunderbird	A blue bird		
Tizen Genie	former mascot of the Tizen operating system for phones	Genie		
Tux	Linux kernel, a free and open-source monolithic Unix-like computer operating system kernel that has been included in many OS distributions	A cartoon anthropomorphic penguin		
Veasel	V programming language	A cartoon weasel		
Wilber	GIMP, a free and open-source raster graphics editor designed for image editing, drawing, image format conversion and others	A creature similar to a Fox or a dog, but is officially a fictional species called a "GIMP"		
Wizard	ImageMagick, a free and open-source cross-platform software suite for displaying, creating, converting, modifying, and editing raster images	A wizard		
Various Wombats	DATATRIEVE, being adopted as the mascot of its product group; references are in the product's help system, and a graphics demonstration using a PLOT WOMBAT command displays the mascot			
Wyvern	LLVM, a set of compiler and toolchain technologies that can be used to develop a compiler frontend for any programming language and backend for any instruction set architecture.	A sytlized wyvern		
Xenia	An alternative to Tux, originally proposed at the same time. Canonically transgender.	An anthropomorphic fox	alt=An anthropomorphic fox standing akimbo, looking at the viewer. She is wearing baggy "Tripp" pants, has large, reflective glasses, and is holding a trans flag. Her shirt reads "LINUX" in green on a black field.	
Xue	Xfce, a free and open-source desktop environment for Unix-like operating systems that aims to be fast and lightweight, while still being visually appealing and easy to use	A stylized mouse		
Zero the Ziguana; Ziggy the Ziguana and Carmen the Allocgator	Zig programming language	Cartoon anthropomorphic iguana and alligator		
Znurt the Flying Saucer	Gentoo Linux	A stylized purple flying saucer		

== See also ==
- List of mascots
- List of video game mascots
- Wikipedia and mascots
