= Tyson Tan =

Chinese concept artist (born 1984)

- 谭代山
- Born: 29 August 1984 (age 42); China
- Other name: 钛山
- Occupations: Concept artist, character designer
- Years active: 2012–present
- Notable work: Konqi (mascot of KDE); Kiki (mascot of Krita); Freedom Planet 2 (Concept artist, character designer)
- Website: tysontan.com

Tyson Tan
- Traditional Chinese: 譚代山
- Simplified Chinese: 谭代山
Transcriptions
Standard Mandarin
- Hanyu Pinyin: Tán Dàishān

Tyson Tan is a Chinese concept artist and character designer. He redesigned KDE's mascot Konqi and designed a few other mascots for free and open-source software projects. Tyson speaks three languages: Chinese, English, and Japanese.

Tyson is observed to have been using only free and open-source software (FOSS) to work since 2012. He has been supporting several FOSS projects in various ways. He has a permissive attitude for others to use his works, and licenses most of his artworks under free licenses like Creative Commons.

== Art style ==
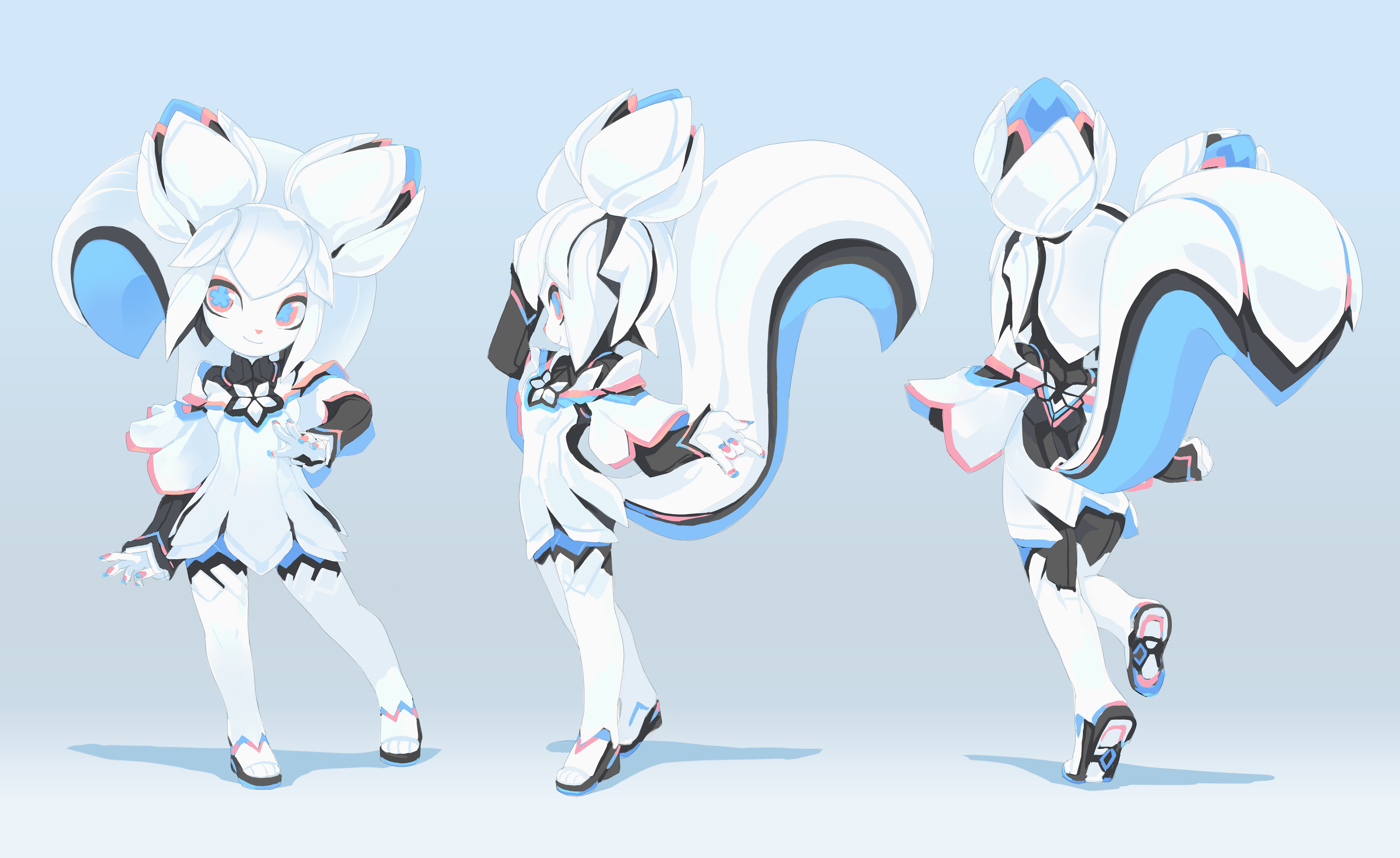
Kiki the Cyber Squirrel, design sheet by Tyson Tan, showing his unique organic mech style.

Tyson has an art style that draws inspirations from both anime and western cartoons. He draws mostly anthropomorphic animal characters. He is also known for his ability of designing robotic characters with organic shapes while keeping a level of convincing mechanical details.

== Works ==
=== FLOSS Mascots ===
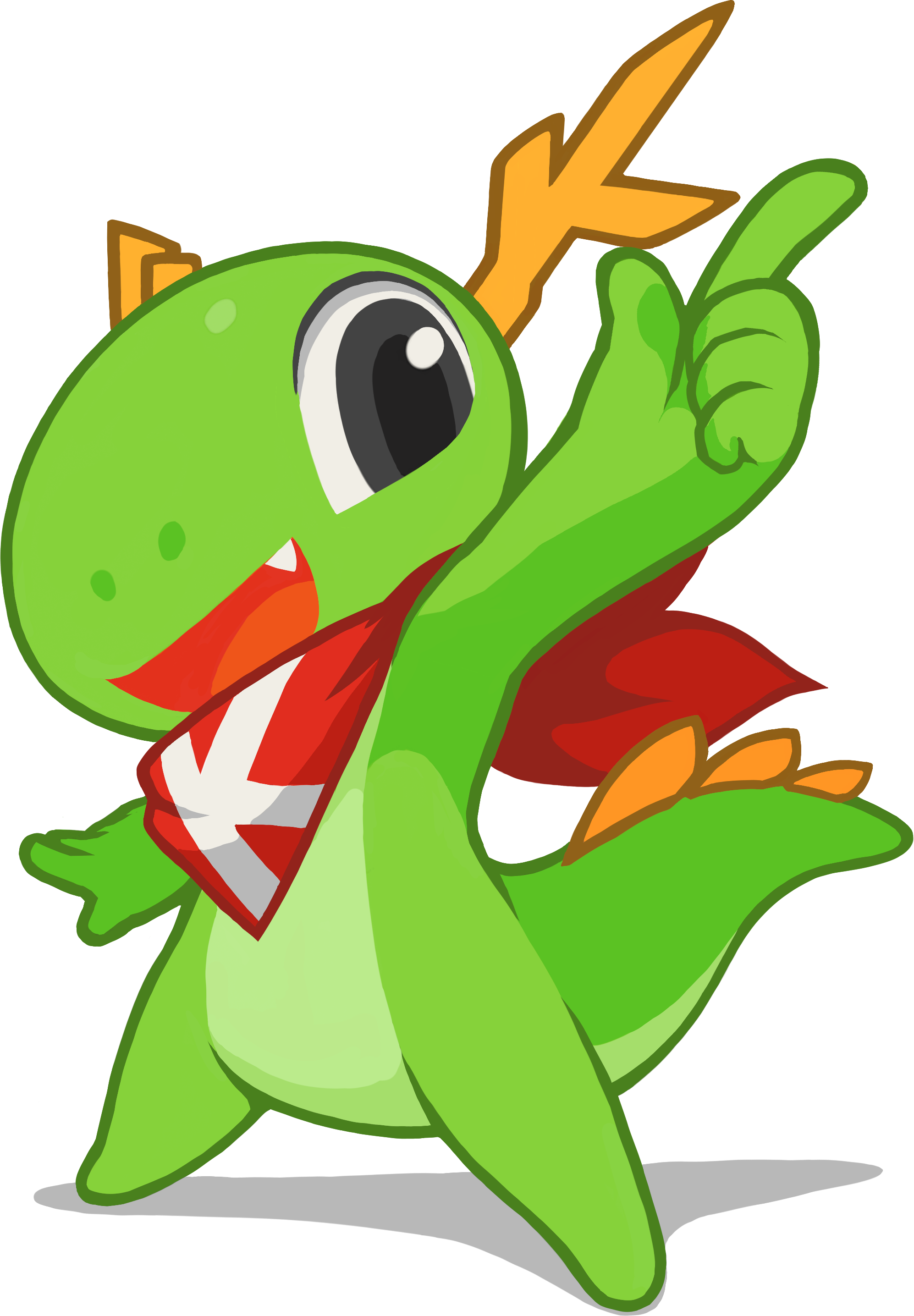
KDE mascot Konqi by Tyson Tan

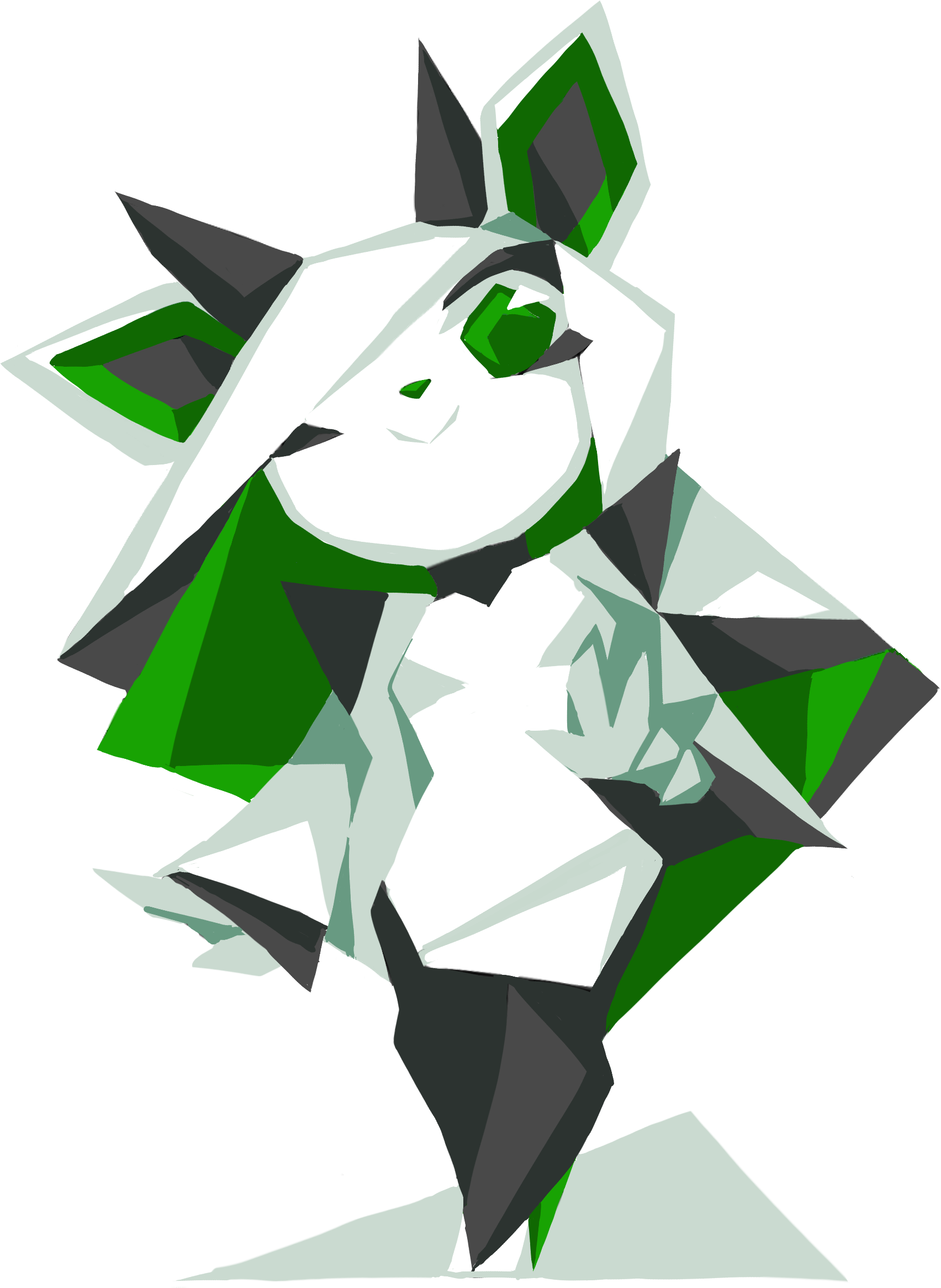
Libbie the Cyber Oryx, proposed LibreOffice mascot

Tyson designed Kiki the Cyber Squirrel as the mascot for digital painting software Krita in 2012, and has been Krita's startup artwork artist since. In 2013, his re-design concept of KDE's mascot Konqi was chosen from a contest and has been used since KDE version 5.x. He also designed Kate the woodpecker as the mascot for advanced text editor Kate in 2014. Tyson submitted a mascot (Libbie the Cyber Oryx) for LibreOffice during a contest run by The Document Foundation in late 2017. However, the contest was cancelled.

=== Video games ===
Tyson drew several pieces of fan-art for the platform game Freedom Planet after its release. His fan-art was later adopted by the game's developer and publisher, GalaxyTrail, for promotional purposes. He later became the concept artist and character designer of the game's sequel, Freedom Planet 2.

=== Books ===
Tyson's works have been included in the following books:

- IMAGINE: the art of Imaginary Friends Studios (Artwork used)
- Furries Furever: Draw and Color Anthro Characters in a Variety of Styles (Artist and writer of Chapter 6)
- Digital Painting with Krita 2.9: Learn All of the Tools to Create Your Next Masterpiece (Cover artist)
- Dessin et peinture numérique avec Krita (Artwork used)
- Made with Krita 2016 (Artwork used)

== See also ==
- Freedom Planet 2
- Konqi, mascot of KDE
- Kiki the Cyber Squirrel, mascot of Krita
- Kate the woodpecker, mascot of Kate editor
- LibreOffice § Mascot competition for details about Libbie the Cyber Oryx
