= Freedom Planet =

2014 video game

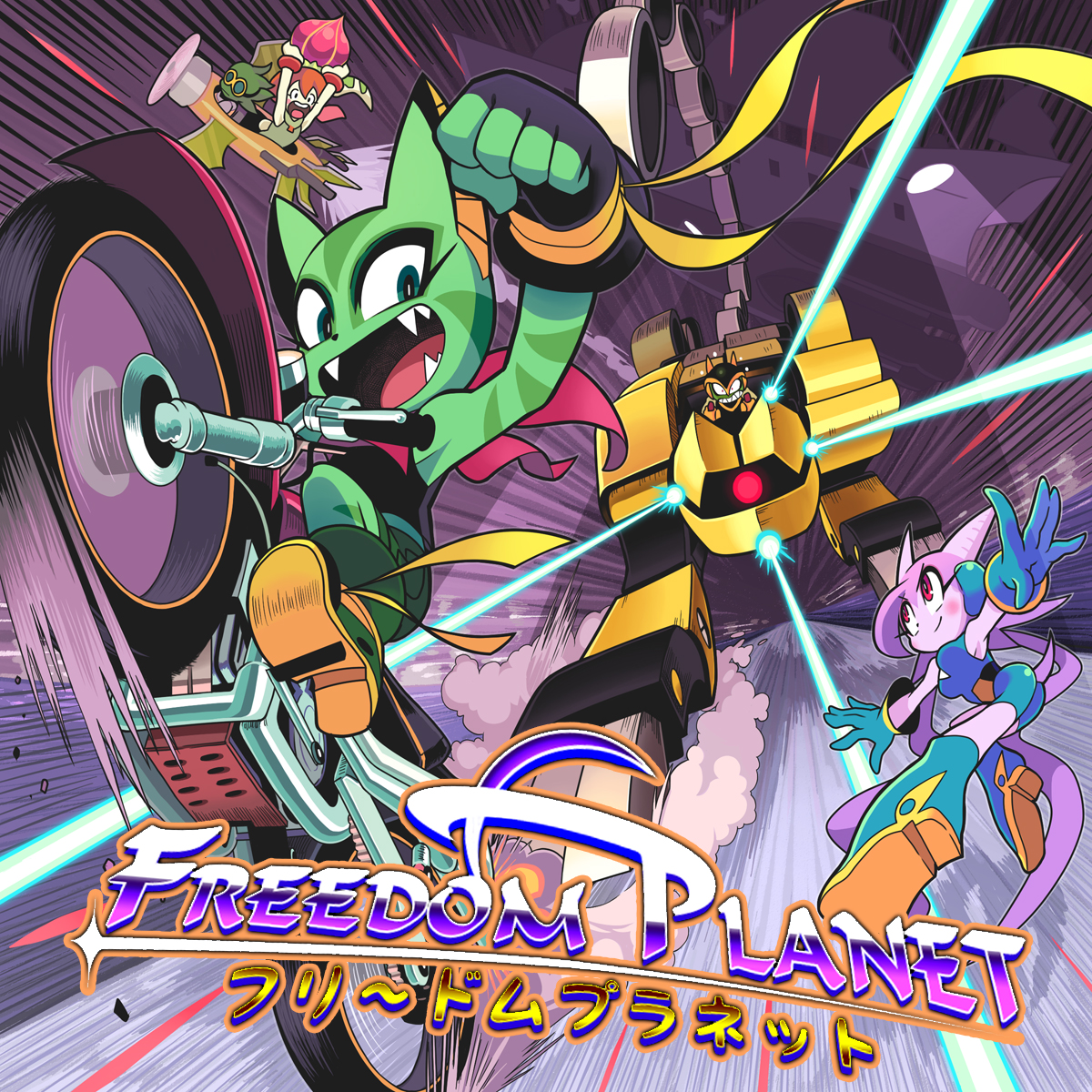
- Developer: GalaxyTrail
- Publisher: GalaxyTrail; Xseed Games (consoles): JP: Marvelous (consoles)
- Director: Sabrina DiDuro
- Designer: Sabrina DiDuro
- Programmer: Sabrina DiDuro
- Writers: Sabrina DiDuro; Edwyn Tiong
- Composers: Sabrina DiDuro; Leila Wilson; Claire Ellis
- Series: Freedom Planet
- Engine: Clickteam Fusion
- Platforms: Windows; OS X; Linux; Wii U; PlayStation 4; Nintendo Switch
- Release: Windows: WW: July 21, 2014; OS X, Linux: WW: April 17, 2015; Wii U: NA: October 1, 2015; EU: October 29, 2015; PlayStation 4: NA: March 21, 2017; EU: August 25, 2017; JP: August 29, 2018; Nintendo Switch: WW: August 30, 2018
- Genre: Platform
- Mode: Single-player

Freedom Planet is a 2014 platform video game developed and published by GalaxyTrail. The player controls one of three anthropomorphic animal protagonists: the dragon girl Lilac, the wildcat Carol, or the Basset Hound Milla. Aided by a duck-like alien named Torque, the girls attempt to defeat the evil Lord Brevon, who plans to steal the Kingdom Stone and conquer the galaxy. While the game focuses on fast-paced platforming, its levels are interspersed with slower action scenes.

Game director Sabrina DiDuro (a.k.a. Strife) first began developing Freedom Planet as a Sonic the Hedgehog fangame using characters created by DeviantArt user Ziyo Ling for its main cast. Early into development, she lost interest in creating a derivative work and reconceived the project as her own intellectual property. Sash Lilac, originally a hedgehog, became a dragon; antagonist Doctor Eggman was replaced by Lord Brevon with his eyebrows resembling Doctor Eggman's mustache; and the Sonic series' ring-based health system was abandoned. Further changes were suggested by fans and incorporated throughout development. Freedom Planet was developed in Denmark and the United States, with its art direction carrying East Asian influences, such as medieval Chinese art inspiring its background visuals.

With development focused on the Windows platform, the game started out as a demo first released in August 2012 and was, after a successful Kickstarter campaign, released in its entirety via Steam in July 2014. Freedom Planet was later released for the Wii U in October 2015, for the PlayStation 4 in 2017, and for the Nintendo Switch in August 2018. The game received largely positive reviews; critics praised its gameplay, visuals, music, aesthetics, sense of humor and balance of Sonic elements with original content, but were mixed on its pacing, voice acting, story and the abundance of long cutscenes.

A sequel, Freedom Planet 2, was released in September 2022 for Windows. Ports for the Nintendo Switch, PlayStation 4, PlayStation 5, Xbox One and Xbox Series X/S, followed in April 2024.

== Gameplay ==
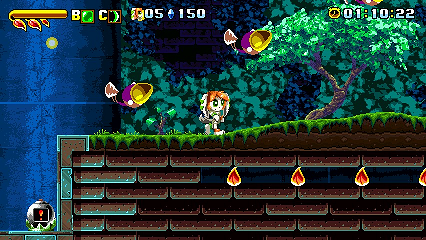
Milla in the "Aqua Tunnel" level. Her health, represented by red leaves, is partially depleted. Leaves that can be collected are visible.

Freedom Planet is a 2D platform game. The player directs one of three characters—Lilac, Carol, or Milla—to run and jump through levels and destroy robotic enemies. Levels contain obstacles such as corkscrews, loop-the-loops, hills, ramps, and rock walls. The player fights a miniboss in the middle of each level and a main boss at the end, after which the story is advanced by cutscenes. Because of its aesthetics, level design, and fast-paced gameplay, Freedom Planet has been compared to the Sonic the Hedgehog games released for the Sega Genesis in the early 1990s.

Unlike in Sonic, the player character has a hit point meter instead of a ring-based health system. To refill this meter, the player collects red leaves dropped by enemies and scattered throughout levels. Lilac's and Carol's maximum health are seven leaves, Milla's is four. Being hit by enemies' and bosses' attacks reduces the character's health, and a life is deducted when no health remains. If all lives are lost, a game over screen appears, but the player may freely restart from the last checkpoint. Extra lives can be found within levels, as can shield and invincibility-type power-ups.

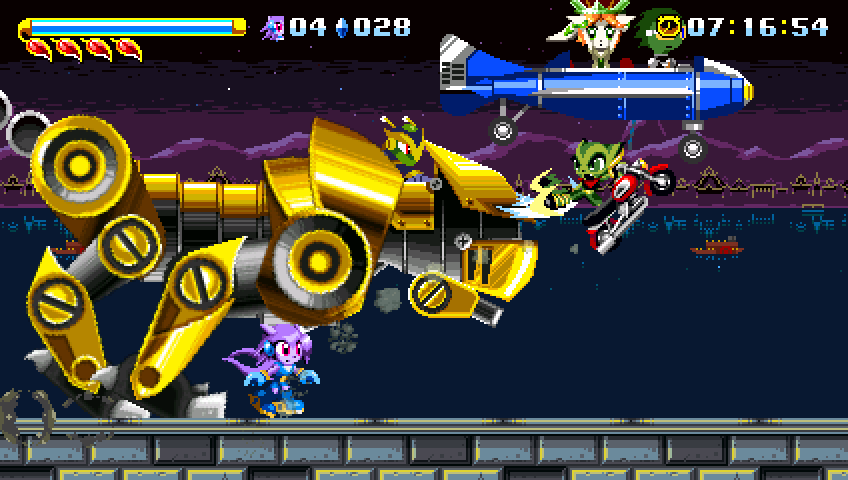
Lilac fights one of the game's bosses, the Robopanther, while Carol assists her with attacks and Milla with extra health.

Each of the playable characters make use of an "attack" and "special" button. Lilac and Carol both make use of an energy gauge on the heads-up display, which recharges on its own and limits the use of their special moves. The gauge can be recharged quicker by collecting crystals and keystones.

Lilac's basic attacks consist of strong but sluggish hair whips, an uppercut into the air, a crouching kick, and a dive kick from midair. The Dragon Cyclone, used by pressing jump midair, lets Lilac spin like a spinning top and deal touch damage, but also acts as a double jump with reduced gravity. Pressing the special button with a full energy gauge activates the Dragon Boost, an eight-directional air dash that deals heavy touch damage and makes her temporarily invincible.

Carol regularly attacks with a cycle of three fast but weak punches, which is changed into a single strong claw attack while rolling or pouncing. The pounce acts as Carol's double jump, slightly moving her forward. Her special attack is a series of rapid kicks which steadily consume a fifth of the energy gauge and give her invincibility. Collecting a fuel tank mid-stage allows her to change into a "motorcycle mode", where her top speed is increased and her acceleration doubled. During "motorcycle mode", the double jump becomes a rolling attack and gets the same properties as Lilac's cyclone move. Pressing "special" on-ground triggers a nitro boost that consumes energy. For vertical mobility, regular Carol is capable of doing a wall jump, "motorcycle mode" Carol can ride up walls. Another set piece only Carol can interact with properly are jump pads, which are placed in a set order and lead to alternating paths by jumping off of them in succession.

Milla, who does not have an energy gauge, can create a cube of energy by holding down the attack button, which she can then throw at enemies. Holding down the special button lets her pull out her shield that can reflect projectiles. Pressing "special" while holding a cube lets Milla use the Super Shield Burst, a strong mid-range beam which pushes Milla in the opposite direction. Milla can fly for a short time while holding the jump button midair by flapping her ears like wings. Milla is considered to be the hardest to play as, since she only has 6 life petals and even though she could heavily damage an enemy by throwing a cube or reflect projectiles, it would always take some time before she could summon an energy block again.

The player may complete the game in either the "Adventure" mode with all cutscenes or "Classic" mode, which omits them In Adventure mode, upon first starting the game, players are only given the option to select from either Lilac or Carol after a cutscene, in which the two temporarily split up. Milla is unlocked by clearing the second stage, Relic Maze, as either Lilac or Carol. Once a stage been cleared for the first time, it is unlocked in the character's time attack mode, wherein the player tries to finish the level in the fastest possible time. Players earn achievements by accomplishing certain goals, such as completing the game as a character or defeating an end boss with a special move.

== Plot ==
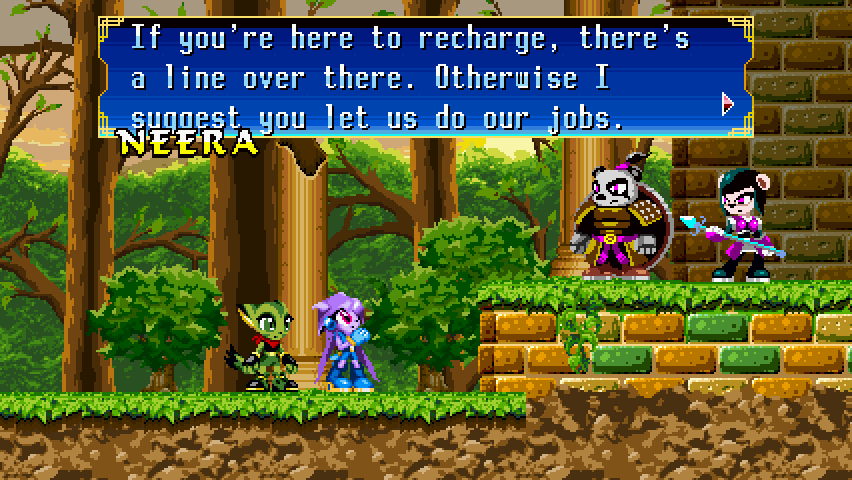
General Gong and Neera Li were initially unimpressed by Carol and Lilac's claims of a planned theft of the King's Stone.

The game begins as Sash Lilac and Carol Tea—an anthropomorphic dragon and wildcat —rescue a duck-billed creature named Torque after his spacecraft crash lands. At Torque's request, the three set out to protect a powerful relic called the Kingdom Stone. This involves them in a conflict between three nations on their planet: Shuigang, a country militarized by its new king, Dail; Shang Mu, led by the wealth-obsessed Mayor Zao (/ˈzaʊ/ or /ˈʒaʊ/); and Shang Tu, whose Royal Magister is unprepared for war. Lilac and Carol rush to the Kingdom Stone's shrine but are waylaid by the Shang Tu officers General Gong and Neera Li, who doubt that the Stone is threatened. The protagonists arrive just as the Stone is stolen by Spade, a henchman hired by Zao. After the shrine collapses, Carol is separated from Lilac and pinned by rubble, but gets saved by the timid Basset Hound Milla (/ˈmiːlə/) Basset.

That night, Torque tells Lilac, Carol, and Milla that he is an alien sent to apprehend the intergalactic warlord Arktivus Brevon, whose spacecraft wrecked on the planet. Brevon has invaded Shuigang, murdered its king, and brainwashed prince Dail to be his servant. He intends to steal the Stone to power his ship. The protagonists decide to reclaim the Stone from Zao, but they are accosted en route by Spade and Brevon's general, Serpentine. In a conversation with Spade, it's revealed that he secretly worked for his half-brother Dail all along. Talking to Spade soon falls short as the group is suddenly attacked by Serpentine using one of his mechs. The delays given by the chase give Dail and Brevon's forces time to steal the relic.

Afterward, Zao sends the protagonists as emissaries to Shang Tu to discuss an alliance against Shuigang. Traveling by airship, the team gets ambushed by Shuigang's sky battalion, and they crash into a river leading to Shang Tu. Arriving at the palace, they are detained by the Magister, as Neera accuses them of trying to cover up Zao's crimes. After an unsuccessful attempt of Milla to break out of jail, Torque is acquitted when Lilac falsely pleads guilty. Lilac, Carol, and Milla quickly break out together to reunite with Torque, only to see him captured by Brevon and Serpentine. Carol quarrels with Lilac and storms off. Lilac sends Milla to find her and then goes to save Torque from Brevon's nearby base, but she is captured and tortured by Brevon. Meanwhile, Carol and Milla ally with Spade to storm the base, where they rescue Torque and Lilac. They are all separated in the ensuing conflict. Neera finds Lilac, arrests her, and brings her back to Shang Tu, where the Magister determines that she is innocent and sends her on a mission to recover an artifact containing information about the Kingdom Stone and their history in return of clearing her name.

Afterwards, the Magister reveals that Zao has challenged Shuigang for the Stone. Lilac rejoins her friends and convinces Shang Mu and Shang Tu to unite against Dail and Brevon's army. During the battle, Brevon announces that his ship is repaired, and Lilac, Milla, and Carol board it. The team combats Brevon's minions, including his AI assistant, Syntax, and a mutated Serpentine. Brevon captures Milla and turns her into a grotesque monster that attacks the other protagonists, who are forced to render her unconscious. Enraged, Lilac and Carol attack and defeat Brevon, but the Kingdom Stone is destroyed and he escapes. Shortly after the battle, Milla awakens in a medical tent, and everyone sees the sky lit up by swirling, crystalline energy released from the Kingdom Stone. The realization of the Kingdom Stone persisting in a different form brought an end to the war. Once Milla has fully recovered, Torque says goodbye to the girls and returns to space, with the promise that he will one day meet them again.

== Development ==
Freedom Planet was conceived in late 2011 by American game designer and programmer Sabrina DiDuro, who had just founded the independent developer GalaxyTrail Games a few years prior. Using the Multimedia Fusion 2 engine, the game was intended to be a small Flash game to "hone [her] skills as a game designer" but quickly grew to become a full indie game set in an original universe. After struggling to find a fitting name for the game, it was made up of the first two words that came in DiDuro's mind, "freedom" and "planet".

Freedom Planet originally began as a direct homage to Sonic. ... As work on the game continued, I felt more and more like it was becoming a waste of time because I was ultimately creating [sic] something in the shadow of an established franchise and that it would never truly be my own work. So, I set out to try and design a main character that would pay homage to my main source of inspiration while still being unique enough to stand out on her own.

— Sabrina DiDuro

Before becoming its own intellectual property, the game started off as a Sonic fangame; a version of the game only seen in early footage show rings and Doctor Eggman as the game's main antagonist. Early on, DiDuro had decided that the Sonic affiliation would hold back the game. By the time of the first publicly released demo, the rings were replaced with red leaves and the characters' abilities were altered. Charging energy for special moves was dependent on Lilac's movement speed was changed to be generating gradually instead as it proved too difficult to control. The physics and controls were also tweaked to be more responsive and tight; running up walls was made easier and jumps were less floaty to allow player to dodge enemy attacks more easily. While the game retained the "speed platform gameplay", it took it in a different direction by introducing combat mechanics based on one of Strife's earlier Sonic fan projects. According to DiDuro, instead of jumping on robots to destroy them, the players fight them with punches, kicks, and special attacks.

In an interview, DiDuro described Freedom Planet as "a nod to '90s-style Japanese platform games, like Sonic, Mega Man, and a little bit of Gunstar Heroes". Lilac's Dragon Boost is based on a game mechanic from Ristar, where the titular character slams its body against enemies similarly. Carol's Wild Kick ability resembles Chun-Li's signature special attack, and her wall kick feels similar to the one found in the Mega Man X games for SNES. Milla's floating ability as well as the ability to pick up items are based on Yoshi's flutter jump and Super Mario 2's throwing mechanics respectively.

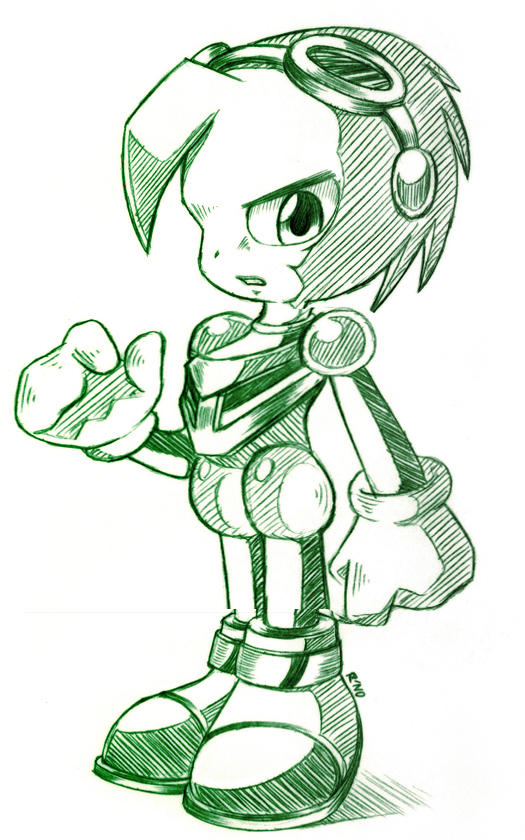
Torque

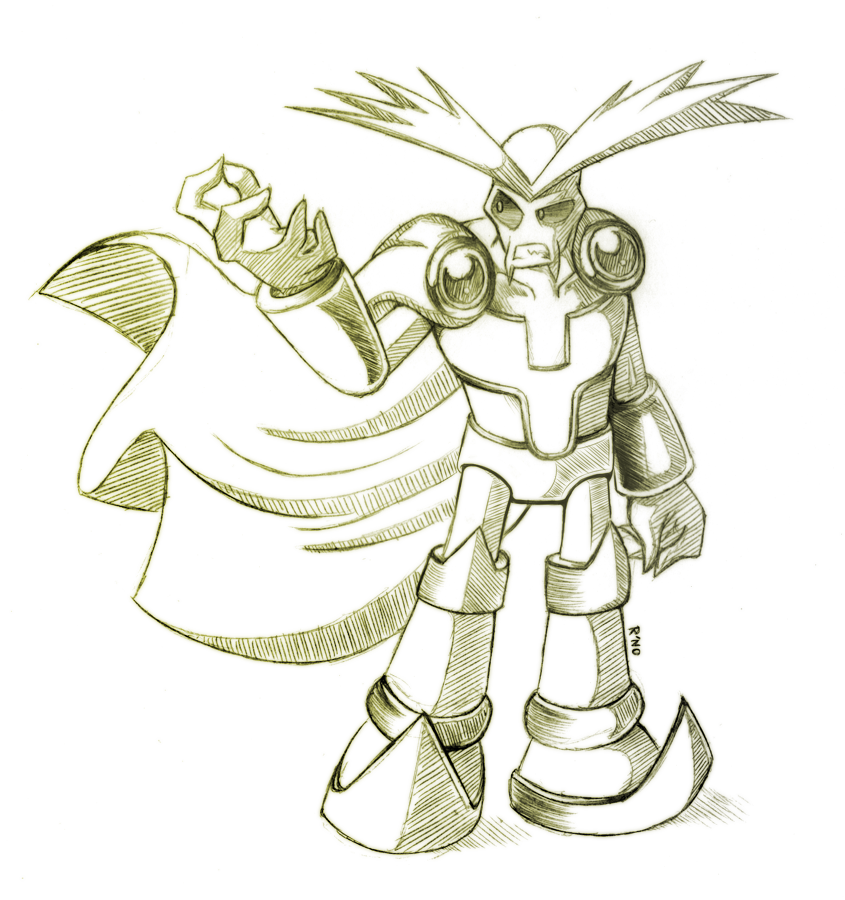
Brevon

Concept art by DiDuro

While the game was developed in Denmark and the United States, its art direction was influenced by medieval East Asian art, particularly that of China. The game's visuals reference modern science fiction and fantasy as well. Much of the text in the game world is written in Chinese characters, and the logo includes a subtitle written in Japanese katakana, Furīdamu Puranetto (フリーダム・プラネット), despite the game originally lacking Japanese language support.

DiDuro's first attempt to design her own protagonist for the game was unsuccessful. Browsing on the art website DeviantArt, she soon discovered Chinese artist Ziyo Ling, requesting and getting permission to use her characters Sash Lilac, followed by Carol Tea and Milla, for her game. Lilac, originally conceived as a hedgehog, was redesigned to be a dragon after criticism about her similar looks to Sonic were made. The design of Robotnik's replacement Lord Brevon, originally named Dr. Brevon, was inspired by Dr. Sloth, one of DiDuro's favorite characters from Neopets.

The soundtrack was composed by DiDuro in collaboration with Leila "Woofle" Wilson and Claire "Blue Warrior" Ellis, the latter having contributed to two of the game's tracks before leaving the project. DiDuro would often provide a base composition in MIDI format, with Woofle creating the final arrangement, but also create additional compositions. Voice actor Dawn M. Bennett, the voice of Lilac, provided voice samples for the tracks Relic Maze 1 and Pangu Lagoon 1 respectively. There were disagreements on the direction of the soundtrack sometimes, with DiDuro wanting "fast-paced and in-your-face from the get-go" while Woofle aimed for more "fly-by-night"; starting "quieter and more happy" and progressively getting intense. Woofle mentioned the track Sky Battalion to have been the hardest thing to compose, stating that it was "the low point in [her] entire career", it wasn't a song that she felt was "appropriate for the game". Regardless, Woofle described DiDuro as "a great musician and (...) easy to collab with".

Post-release, the game received updates, such as an update in December 2015 that made Milla accessible in Adventure mode. Updates to make Torque and Spade playable characters were planned for release in 2016 but have been postponed to focus on the sequel. Another reason, according to DiDuro, were her displeasure with the way Torque felt in the existing stages.

== Release ==
Freedom Planet was first released as a demo for Microsoft Windows in August 2012, to positive reception. After a full version of the game was funded through Kickstarter, it was taken to Steam Greenlight and approved for Steam. Its release was first projected for early 2014, then delayed to June 30. Shortly before that date, it was delayed again to July 19; the developers wanted to promote the game at a convention in Miami, Florida, and to avoid competition from the heavily discounted products in Steam's Summer Sale. The game was released, after a third delay, on July 21, since Steam didn't allow games to be released on weekends. Coinciding with the game's release, GalaxyTrail released Freedom Planet - Official Soundtrack, a digital version of the soundtrack, as DLC.

To advertise the game, GalaxyTrail created branded T-shirts, and Lilac was included as an easter egg in the 2013 game Sonic: After the Sequel. DiDuro considered and rejected the idea of developing an Android version of Freedom Planet, but stated to be saving money to port the game to the PlayStation Vita. The game was released on the website GOG.com in late 2014. GalaxyTrail also developed versions for Mac OS X and Linux, which were released on Steam on April 17, 2015.

A Nintendo's Wii U version was planned for release on the eShop online store for late 2015, later specified as August 13. A demo was released as part of a promotion titled "Nindies@home", wherein players were invited to try several upcoming Wii U games between June 15 and 22. While it was still in production during the summer, the projected release date was delayed; the Wii U version was set back by a "console-freezing bug", which would postpone the Wii U release indefinitely until the issue was fixed. DiDuro later explained that the bug had taken so long to detect because it only occurred in retail versions of the console, preventing GalaxyTrail and Nintendo from learning of the issue. The bug required a hard reset of the system to address the problem, which could potentially cause damage to the Wii U hardware. The bug was eventually fixed, and the game was successfully released on the eShop on October 1; customers who had tried the game's demo were rewarded with a 15-percent discount. On the American Nintendo eShop, Freedom Planet was a best-seller, peaking at the 2nd spot, right behind Super Mario Maker.

In November 2015, GalaxyTrail joined forces with the subscription box company IndieBox distribute an exclusive physical release of Freedom Planet. This limited collector's edition box included a flash-drive with a DRM-free game file, the official two-disc soundtrack, an instruction manual and Steam key, along with various custom-designed collectibles. Steam and Wii U versions of Freedom Planet combined have sold over 250,000 times as of June 2016.

A version for the Nintendo Switch was released by Marvelous Inc. and Xseed Games on August 30, 2018. Quality of life updates present in the Switch version as well as the newly added language options were released for the remaining versions soon after. In 2019, GalaxyTrail teamed up with Limited Run Games to distribute a physical release of the Switch version. Switch Limited Run #35: Freedom Planet and Freedom Planet Deluxe Edition, which includes a cover with interior art and full-color booklet, were up for pre-order. The Deluxe Edition also includes the two-disc soundtrack, a reversible poster, as well as a Genesis-style case.

== Reception ==
=== Pre-release ===
Tony Ponce of Destructoid reacted positively about the demo for Freedom Planet and commented that it was "nice to see a well-established style or formula applied to a new world with original characters". Similarly, Eurogamer's Jeffrey Matulef described the game's preview as "an indie Sonic-esque platformer done right", and enjoyed the redesigned health system. Dominic Tarison of IndieStatik complimented the game's "new and unfamiliar configuration" of elements from classic 16-bit games, but criticized the amount of viewable gameplay area. John Polson of IndieGames.com believed that "the spectacles like loops and wall runs ... [are not] as magical to do or watch" as in Sonic games, but he encouraged platformer fans to download the demo.

Nathan Grayson of Kotaku praised the demo for its balance of Genesis Sonic elements and original content: he described the product as "a love letter to classic Sonic, except when it's not". He praised the game's enemies, but experienced minor control issues. Pacing was remarked to be slower than that of the Genesis Sonic games because of the added combat sequences, though Grayson felt that this gave the player time to explore and appreciate the level design. Grayson was critical of the voice acting. Ponce strongly praised the visuals, though criticized the bland foreground design. Polson noted minor audio and visual flaws, most notably the recycling of sound effects from Genesis Sonic games, but he lauded the game's music. Tarison praised the music and visuals, as well as the varied designs of the environments and playable characters.

=== Post-release ===
Reception

Aggregate score
Aggregator	Score
Metacritic	(PC) 83/100 (NS) 81/100 (WII U) 84/100

Review scores
Publication	Score
Destructoid	7/10
Eurogamer	8/10
GameSpot	7/10
Hardcore Gamer	4.5/5
Nintendo Life	8/10
Nintendo World Report	9/10
Push Square	7/10

Freedom Planet was met with highly positive reviews upon release. Reviewing the full version, Jahanzeb Khan of Hardcore Gamer felt that it was a worthy successor to the 1994 game Sonic 3 & Knuckles - which he considered the series' pinnacle - and that it was "perhaps the most Sonic game to have come out since 1994, one that feels like a true evolution and more importantly a resounding step forward". Jonatan Allin of the Danish version of Eurogamer, who had not enjoyed any Sonic games since the Genesis era, concurred with Khan. Polygon's Griffin McElroy argued that Freedom Planet successfully performs "a difficult balancing act, borrowing and transforming elements from games like Sonic the Hedgehog and Rocket Knight Adventures without coming off as derivative". McElroy and Pablo Taboada of the Spanish-language website MeriStation both compared the game to the work of developer Treasure. Taboada lamented the game's obscurity and suggested that, had Treasure obtained the rights to Sonic and released Freedom Planet as an official sequel, it would have been more popular.

Khan commented that the levels "never feel like they're over too soon nor do they drag on unnecessarily", and he appreciated the setpiece moments such as "explosive chase/escape sequences, maze like labyrinths, traps, and even shoot-'em-up style shooting segments". Taboada was mixed on the game's brevity: he thought it was suitable for speedrunning but unsatisfying for those seeking a deeper experience. By contrast, Japanese website 4Gamer stated that the game's quirks allowed one to play extensively without boredom, and Taboada enjoyed the large, Metroidvania-style levels.

Regarding the game's visuals, Taboada said, "Técnicamente es excelso" (technically, it is excellent). He praised the colorful and detailed backgrounds, expressive character animations, sound effects, and music. Khan agreed: he commented that "every inch of it exud[es] artistic diversity with high resolution sprites that resemble the quality of yesteryear". He called the audio a "nice mix of catchy chiptune style melodies with infectious synthetic beats". Both Khan and 4Gamer were intrigued by the game's East Asian visual style. Taboada believed that each character was likable and interesting to play. Allin found himself unexpectedly captivated by the story, which he guessed many players would miss due to impatience with cutscenes.

== Sequel ==
A direct sequel, Freedom Planet 2, was released on September 13, 2022 for Windows, with console versions published by Xseed Games released in April 4, 2024.
