= Gekkeiju =

Gekkeiju may refer to:

- Gekkeiju Online, a video game
- Gekkeiju, the Japanese translation of Laurus nobilis, bay laurel
