= Luandi (disambiguation) =

Luandi may refer to:

- Luandi
- Zhizhi, also known as Luandi Hutuwusi

== See also ==
- Luanti (formerly Minetest)
