= Octodad =

2010 video game

- Developer: DePaul University
- Director: Kevin Zuhn
- Producer: John Murphy
- Designers: Jake Anderson; Kyle Marks; Greg Mladucky; Majdi Badri
- Programmers: Brian O'Donnel; Philip Tibitoski; Devon Scott-Tunkin; Shervin Hossein; Kevin Geisler; Philip Ono
- Artists: Nick Esparza; Benjamin Canfield; Chris Stallman; Kyle Hewitt; Pil Chang
- Writers: Kevin Zuhn; Majdi Badri
- Composer: Seth Parker
- Engine: Irrlicht
- Platforms: Microsoft Windows, OS X
- Release: October 31, 2010
- Genre: Adventure
- Mode: Single-player

Octodad is a freeware independent video game developed by a group of students at DePaul University, many of whom would go on to form Young Horses, Inc., the developers of its sequel Octodad: Dadliest Catch. The game was developed for the Student Showcase of the 2011 Independent Games Festival, and would go on to be one of 8 winners in the Student Showcase award of that year. The plot revolves around the player, controlling Octodad, attempting to complete various household chores and tasks while maintaining his secret identity as an average human with a family. The gameplay consists of primarily ragdoll physics, turning mundane tasks into significant challenges. Dadliest Catch was released on January 30, 2014, and was one of the first titles to be given the Steam Greenlight.

== Synopsis ==
A screenshot of the game, showing the main character.

In Octodad, the player is in control of an octopus posing as a human man with a normal, human family. The gameplay largely revolves around the balance of keeping this charade alive while completing household chores, and evading his wife Scarlet's increasing suspicion of her husband's strange behavior. The antagonist of the game is the manic Japanese chef Fujimoto, who obsessively seeks to expose the octopus' secret and cook him. Fujimoto is the only character who sees through the protagonist's disguise from the beginning.

== Gameplay ==
There are two different modes within Octodad the user can switch between in order to complete tasks. The first is default mode, used for moving the character throughout the game, mainly within the confines of the family house. All of his limbs are controlled independently; however, in "attack" mode, only the legs are available to the player. To move the left and right 'leg' tentacles for walking, the player must press and hold the right mouse button and push the mouse forward and release when they want to put the mouse back down and take a step.

== Plot ==
Octodad, awakened by his wife Scarlett, realizes he's overslept and has a busy day ahead. He plans to create a mannequin of himself using a suit, a doll, and a banana to sneak into his basement for secret work to finish a gift. However, Scarlett reminds him of their anniversary and urges him to take the night off for a romantic dinner. Octodad agrees and sets out to handle chores and take care of their kids. After completing challenges set by his son Tommy, Octodad retrieves his suit from a grandfather clock and settles down, but an unsettling TV advertisement featuring a crazed fish restaurant chef, Fujimoto, adds an eerie twist to his day.

As Octodad continues his tasks, Scarlett returns from the store with a banana, which Octodad despises due to his propensity to slip on banana peels. She agrees to give him the banana once he finishes his kitchen chores. Afterward, Octodad addresses his daughter Stacy's fear of monsters in her room and ensures she's comforted. He also creates a substitute doll for her, proceeding to build the mannequin in the dining room. Suddenly, Fujimoto bursts in, challenging Octodad and setting the dining room on fire. Octodad manages to fool the chef with his mannequin, and the chef leaves after a confrontation with Octodad's children, vowing revenge.

Scarlett returns in a fancy dress, and Octodad sneaks into the basement to retrieve a key. He opens a secret passageway and is confronted by Fujimoto, who activates a series of lasers and traps. Octodad successfully navigates the obstacles, rides a zipline, and enters a working station with a gift, awaiting the finishing touch.

== Development ==
The team behind the original Octodad consisted of eighteen students attending the DePaul University of Chicago, Illinois, eight of whom went to form Young Horses Inc, the team behind its sequel Dadliest Catch. Its origins have been described as "The idea was originally a joke, based on another idea that was a joke that came about through the frustration of us not being able to come up with something original" by programmer Phillip Tibitoski in an interview with video game website Joystiq. The initial idea was inspired by such movies as Men in Black and Being John Malkovich. The game Trespasser served as an inspiration for the gameplay, particularly the controls. Developer Phil Tibotski stated of Trespasser's controls' "In that game it was meant to be this serious cool feature, but it ended up being this glitchy, disastrous, but hilarious, mess," Through Trespasser the team noted that they could make the game a comedy through the gameplay in addition to the premise itself.

During the development of the game, the control scheme was a major point of debate, with many various formats being considered, including the traditional WASD format, as well as the use of a secondary mouse, and thus it was settled for the current method that was described by Rob Lockhart as "the greatest source of novelty, as well as frustration".

In its current form, Young Horses Inc consists of eight of the original 18 developers, with those who are no longer partaking in development signing over rights to Octodad in return for a share of the company as well as royalties from the sequel.

== Reception ==
Octodad was well received by critics and the public alike. It was praised for its comedy, as well as its interesting gameplay style. It received 3.5 out of 5 from the-back-row. Although it is known for being very difficult to play, the game designers are praised for keeping it short being able to complete in under an hour. Allen Cook from Gamers with Jobs described it as "the best slapstick routine I've seen in a game, period". However it did receive some criticism for not resolving some plot points such as the chef that threatens to cook the main character and appears in the family home. Overall, the game was cited as being very well written for a college project. It has also been compared to the game QWOP due to how both games feature awkward controls as a key feature of the game.

== Sequel ==
Octodad: Dadliest Catch is the sequel to Octodad and one of the first games to be successfully greenlit via Steam. It was funded through Kickstarter, achieving a funding level of $24,320 and surpassing the developer's goal of $20,000, with funding ending in August 2011. The game was released for Microsoft Windows, Mac OS, and Linux on January 30, 2014, PlayStation 4 on April 22, 2014, PlayStation Vita on May 26, 2015, Xbox One on August 25, 2015, Wii U and IOS on October 29, 2015, Android on November 4, 2015 and Nintendo Switch on November 9, 2017.
