= Bugsnax =

2020 video game

- Developer: Young Horses
- Publisher: Young Horses
- Director: Kevin Zuhn
- Designer: John Murphy
- Programmers: Kevin Geisler; Devon Scott-Tunkin
- Artists: Christopher Stallman; Megan Varde
- Writer: Kevin Zuhn
- Composer: Seth Parker
- Engine: Irrlicht Engine
- Platforms: macOS; PlayStation 4; PlayStation 5; Windows; Nintendo Switch; Xbox One; Xbox Series X/S; iOS; tvOS
- Release: macOS, PS4, Windows; WW: November 12, 2020; PlayStation 5; NA/OC: November 12, 2020; WW: November 19, 2020; Switch, Xbox One, Xbox Series X/S; WW: April 28, 2022; iOS, tvOS; WW: July 12, 2023
- Genre: Adventure
- Mode: Single-player

Bugsnax is a 2020 adventure video game developed by independent Chicago-based developer Young Horses. In the game, players explore a mysterious island and attempt to find and capture the eponymous insectoid food creatures. It was unveiled in June 2020 during Sony's PlayStation 5 live-streamed reveal event. British indie pop band Kero Kero Bonito performed the theme song, which was featured in the announcement trailer. The game was released in November 2020 for the PlayStation 4 and PlayStation 5, as well as macOS and Windows via the Epic Games Store. Versions for Steam, Nintendo Switch, Xbox One, and Xbox Series X/S released in April 2022, followed by a port for iOS in July 2023.

== Gameplay ==
Bugsnax is a first-person adventure game, in which players traverse the mysterious Snaktooth Island to find clues regarding the disappearance of a missing explorer. The core gameplay revolves around finding and capturing different species of Bugsnax, the half-bug-half-snack creatures that inhabit the island. The game launched with 100 Bugsnak species available for capture, each of which can be found in one of eight biomes during different times of day. The player is equipped with a "SnaxScope" that can be used to scan each Bugsnak, which displays its movement patterns, tastes, and clues as to how to capture it. The player can also obtain several tools to assist in capturing the Bugsnax, including a slingshot that can shoot different sauces such as ketchup and chocolate to lure Bugsnax; a tripwire that can be used to stun Bugsnax; and a Strabby named Sprout, a strawberry-like Bugsnak in a plastic ball that can be guided using a laser pointer. Some Bugsnax require more advanced techniques to capture them, such as using multiple tools in combination or baiting one Bugsnak into attacking another.

The town of Snaxburg acts as the central hub from which all other areas can be reached. During the story, the player will encounter several Grumpuses, the residents of Snaxburg who have scattered themselves around the island. The player must convince each of the Grumpuses to return to Snaxburg to advance the story. When a Grumpus has returned to Snaxburg, they will begin asking the player for favors, which take the form of side quests, and reveal more of their personal history and motivations as each one is completed. These side quests typically involve the player capturing specific Bugsnax and feeding them to the Grumpuses, which transforms parts of their bodies based on the properties of whatever Bugsnak they eat. A "Snaktivator" device unlocked during the story allows the player to more heavily customize each Grumpus' appearance, such as selecting specific body parts to transform.

A free update to the game in April 2022, titled The Isle of Bigsnax, added a new area to explore and 12 additional Bugsnax to collect for a total of 112. The Bugsnax in this area are larger than normal and must be temporarily shrunken using special "Shrink Spice" before they can be captured. The new area is accessed during the main story as part of a larger side quest. The update also added the ability to fast travel between areas, 25 hats that can be collected and placed on Bugsnax the player has captured, and a hut for the player character in Snaxburg, which can be customized with furniture and decorations received from the other Grumpuses. New hut decorations can be obtained by completing missions sent by the Grumpuses to the player's mailbox, such as finding a lost item or feeding a Grumpus a specific combination of Bugsnax; there are over 100 missions that can be completed.

== Plot ==
=== Setting and characters ===
Bugsnax takes place in a world populated by furry muppet-like humanoids called Grumpuses. The game is set on Snaktooth Island, a mysterious island inhabited solely by creatures called Bugsnax who are "half bug and half snack." The ruins of an ancient Grumpus civilization can be found around the island, along with their skeletal remains. Upon discovering the existence of Bugsnax, disgraced explorer Elizabert "Lizbert" Megafig (Helen Sadler) leads an expedition team to the island to study them, establishing the makeshift town of Snaxburg as a base of operations, but disappears under mysterious circumstances. As part of the "Isle of Bigsnax" update, the small neighboring island of Broken Tooth becomes accessible later in the story.

The player controls an unnamed newspaper journalist who is invited by Lizbert to visit Snaktooth Island over the objections of their supervisor, C. Clumby Clumbernut (Barbara Goodson). Aiding the journalist is Filbo Fiddlepie (Max Mittelman), the self-appointed Mayor of Snaxburg who was left in charge by Lizbert before she disappeared, despite lacking self-confidence. Over the course of the story, the journalist meets several other Grumpuses who joined Lizbert on her expedition. These include Wambus Troubleham (Fred Tatasciore), a stubborn sauce-farmer; Beffica Winklesnoot (Cassandra Lee Morris), a gossip-seeking photographer; Gramble Gigglefunny (Sam Riegel), a rancher who treats Bugsnax as pets instead of food; Wiggle Wigglebottom (Kenna Ramsey), a washed-up musician; Triffany Lottablog (Haviland Stillwell), Wambus's estranged archaeologist wife; Cromdo Face (Rick Zieff), a greedy entrepreneur and con-man; Snorpington "Snorpy" Fizzlebean (Roger Craig Smith), an inventor and conspiracy theorist obsessed with the "Grumpinati"; Chandlo Funkbun (Yuri Lowenthal), Snorpy's overprotective bodybuilder boyfriend; Floofty Fizzlebean (Casey Mongillo), Snorpy's antisocial scientist sibling; Shellsy "Shelda" Woolbag (Debra Wilson), an alleged prophet who preaches the evils of Bugsnax; and Eggabell Batternugget (Fryda Wolff), the town doctor and Lizbert's romantic partner who also went missing. In the "Isle of Bigsnax" update, the player can also find several messages left behind by researcher Alegander Jamfoot (Tom Taylorson).

=== Story ===
A struggling newspaper journalist receives a film strip in the mail from Lizbert, who encourages the journalist to come to Snaktooth Island and document the Bugsnax living there for the world to see. Intrigued, the journalist takes an airship to the island, only to discover that Lizbert has gone missing and all the other Grumpuses that joined her on her expedition have scattered due to interpersonal conflict. Filbo requests that the journalist help him bring the others back to Snaxburg, as they may have clues regarding Lizbert's disappearance.

The journalist gradually convinces each Grumpus to return to Snaxburg. However, the Grumpuses regularly argue with each other, and each of them suffer from their own personal issues that they believe can be solved by eating Bugsnax. Some of them believe that there is a secret conspiracy behind the island: Snorpy thinks that the "Grumpinati" are controlling the Bugsnax, while Shelda warns of their harmful "toxins". One night, Snaxburg is attacked, and signs appear warning its residents to leave the island. Wiggle claims that the "Queen of Bugsnax" is planning to eat the Grumpuses. In the "Isle of Bigsnax" expansion, the journalist can discover a secret room with audio recordings from Jamfoot. These recordings reveal that the supposed "Grumpinati" are actually the Snakolytes, a secret order Jamfoot is a member of whose goal is to create a new Bugsnak Queen and gain control of all Bugsnax.

After the journalist brings all residents back to Snaxburg, a volcano erupts, triggering an earthquake that destroys the town. Eggabell arrives and leads the journalist and Filbo to a hidden chamber beneath the island, which is itself revealed to be made of Bugsnax. There, they discover that Lizbert has been mutated into a giant creature made up of various Bugsnax. Lizbert explains that Bugsnax are actually mind-altering parasites that eventually transform anyone who regularly consumes them into more Bugsnax, as they had done to the island's previous inhabitants, and she has been attempting to keep the Bugsnax under control as their queen. With her control waning, Lizbert urges the group to flee the island, and Eggabell becomes part of the "queen" as well to support her efforts. Filbo and the journalist return to Snaxburg, which is now under attack from various Bugsnax. If the player fails to defend the Grumpuses during the sequence, they can die from eating the Bugsnax attacking them, becoming Bugsnax themselves. However, any Grumpus whose side quests have all been completed will fight back against the Bugsnax and automatically survive the encounter. After fending off the Bugsnax, the journalist, Filbo, and any survivors escape on the journalist's airship.

Upon returning to the mainland, Filbo acts as a witness for the journalist's story, passing Bugsnax off as fictional creatures. Clumby is impressed with the story, but fires the journalist anyway. Filbo then decides to run for Mayor of New Grump City, asking for the journalist's help. Saving every Grumpus during the finale unlocks an alternate credits sequence revealing each Grumpus's current whereabouts, including that Filbo has been elected Mayor and Lizbert and Eggabell have been de-transformed, and a post-credits scene. In it, Clumby can be heard talking to Jamfoot, believing that the journalist is hiding the truth and deciding to keep watch on them, revealing herself to be a Snakolyte. If the player also listened to all of Jamfoot's audio recordings, an alternate scene plays in which Jamfoot calls Clumby, fearful that the journalist knows all the Snakolytes' secrets, and orders her to find out all she can about the survivors of Snaktooth. The game ends with a single Strabby emerging from inside the airship.

== Development ==
Young Horses took about six years to develop Bugsnax in order "not to burn out", as well as "to figure out what the game was." The initial idea was when the company's creative director Kevin Zuhn drew a sketch of a "Wafflepillar"—a caterpillar made out of waffles. Initially the gameplay was inspired heavily by Pokémon Snap, but over time the gameplay evolved into "a weird amalgamation of all of these different game ideas." In addition to Pokémon Snap, the final game also takes inspiration from Ape Escape, Dark Cloud and Viva Piñata. Zuhn also stated that during the developmental phase, the storyline for Bugsnax was intended to be much darker.

The game was first revealed via an announcement trailer during Sony's Future Revealed PlayStation 5 event on June 11, 2020. The trailer featured the theme song "It's Bugsnax!", performed by British indie pop band Kero Kero Bonito. The song became popular in its own right, with GamesRadar+ calling it "the internet's new favorite meme ingredient", also writing "even if you haven't heard of Bugsnax, the game, there's a good chance you've probably heard Bugsnax, the theme tune."

== Release ==
Bugsnax was released as a launch title for PlayStation 5 on November 12, 2020, alongside versions for PlayStation 4, macOS, and Windows via the Epic Games Store.

In January 2021, Young Horses confirmed they were working on a followup to Bugsnax, but had not determined whether this would be a proper sequel or downloadable content. The following October, this was revealed to be an expansion, Bugsnax: The Isle of Bigsnax, which would be added via a free update in Q1 2022. The expansion was released on April 28, 2022, alongside ports of the game for Steam, Nintendo Switch, Xbox One, and Xbox Series X/S. A port for iOS released on July 12, 2023.

On October 6, 2024, Young Horses released a beta version of Bugsnax for SteamVR.

== Reception and sales ==
Reception

Aggregate scores
Aggregator	Score
Metacritic	PC: 72/100; PS4: 79/100; PS5: 75/100; NS: 78/100
OpenCritic	65% recommend

Review scores
Publication	Score
Destructoid	7/10
Edge	8/10
Game Informer	7/10
GameSpot	8/10
GamesRadar+	4/5
IGN	8/10
Nintendo Life	NS: 5/10
Nintendo World Report	NS: 8.5/10
PC Gamer (US)	60/100
USgamer	4/5

Bugsnax on home consoles received "generally favorable reviews", while the Windows version saw "mixed or average reviews", according to the review aggregator Metacritic. OpenCritic determined that 65% of critics recommend the game. Several critics noted how the story and presentation was perceived as lighthearted but that the ending's effect gave the plot a dark tone. The game was also praised for its emphasis on character development and worldbuilding.

LGBT-video game blog Gayming Magazine praised the inclusion of same-sex couples. The game was nominated for a GLAAD Media Award for Outstanding Video Game.

Despite the PlayStation 5 version being available for free via PlayStation Plus for its first two months of release, Bugsnax has outsold Octodad: Dadliest Catch, Young Horses' previous game.

== See also ==
- List of video games with LGBT characters
