= Young Horses =

American video game developer

Young Horses, Inc.
- Industry: Video games
- Founded: October 6, 2011; 14 years ago
- Headquarters: Chicago, Illinois, U.S.
- Owner: Phil Tibitoski
- Number of employees: 10
- Website: younghorsesgames.com

Young Horses, Inc. is an American video game developer based in Chicago, Illinois. The studio is best known for its games Octodad, Octodad: Dadliest Catch, and Bugsnax.

== History ==
Young Horses was originally a group of 18 game developers that all went to DePaul University. They worked together on the game Octodad at that time. At the Game Developers Conference in March 2011, Octodad was nominated for an award for Student Showcase Winner.

In October of that year, the group met again, and 8 of the group decided to create a studio to create a sequel to Octodad, Octodad: Dadliest Catch.

After a Kickstarter campaign, Octodad: Dadliest Catch was released on January 30, 2014.

They released their second game, Bugsnax, on November 12, 2020.

They released Bugsnax: The Card Game in 2024, after an ongoing Kickstarter campaign.

== Games developed ==
Year	Title	Platform(s)	Notes	Ref
2010	Octodad	Microsoft Windows, OS X	Student project; made before formal company	
2014	Octodad: Dadliest Catch	Android, iOS, Linux, Microsoft Windows, Nintendo Switch, OS X, PlayStation 4, PlayStation Vita, tvOS, Wii U, Xbox One		
2014	Antbassador	Microsoft Windows	Game jam project	
2015	Snakedate	Microsoft Windows	Game jam project	
2020	Bugsnax	macOS, PlayStation 4, PlayStation 5, Microsoft Windows, Nintendo Switch, Xbox One, Xbox Series X/S, iOS		
2023	IndependANT	Microsoft Windows	Tech demo for Unreal Engine 5	
