= H-Craft Championship =

2007 video game

- H-Craft Championship logo
- Developer: Irrgheist
- Publishers: Manifesto Games (international); Akella (Russian version)
- Engine: Irrlicht
- Platforms: Android, Windows, Linux
- Release: May 24, 2007 (English); July 19, 2007 (Russian)
- Genre: Racing game
- Modes: Single-player, multiplayer

H-Craft Championship is a science fiction racing game developed by independent game studio Irrgheist. The game was built using the free graphics engine Irrlicht for Windows, Linux and Android. In 2007 the game was released in digital distribution internationally by Manifesto Games and in a Russian version by Akella. In 2014, after a long downtime, the developers released the game as freeware. In February 2015 the source code was released as open-source under the zlib license. The media files remain proprietary.

== Gameplay ==
The game features various hovercraft which race on superhighways in the sky, meaning that an important part of the game involves staying on track and not falling to the ground. It features several different games modes: "Championship" acts as the single-player campaign, while "Rival" allows for multiplayer games with up to four players in sequence. In addition it also features "Arcade" and "Time attack" game modes.

== Reception ==
Although not widely known, what reviews there are for the game are generally positive. AllForLinux included it in its list of top Linux games, and LinuxLinks included it as part of their list of "42 of the Best Commercial Linux Games". It also holds a four out of five star rating at The Linux Game Tome.

== See also ==
- Ballistics
- List of open source games
