= Star Ruler =

2010 video game

- Developer: Blind Mind Studios
- Publishers: NA: Interactive Gaming Software (IGS); EU: Iceberg Interactive
- Director: Andrew Ackermann
- Programmer: Lucas DeVries
- Artist: James Woodall Michael Singleton
- Composer: Artem Bank
- Engine: Irrlicht Engine
- Platform: Windows
- Release: August 21, 2010 Digital Releases; August 21, 2010 (GG, D2D); August 23, 2010 (Impulse); September 20, 2010 (Steam) Boxed Releases: NA: Mid-October, 2011; EU: September 16, 2011
- Genre: Real-time strategy / 4X
- Modes: Single-player, multiplayer

Star Ruler is a space 4X / RTS hybrid developed and published by American company Blind Mind Studios.

Star Ruler was first announced on July 5, 2009 in the Irrlicht Community Forums, the game engine on which Star Ruler was based. It was released on August 21, 2010. The game was launched in retail outlets in the EU on August 16, 2011 via Iceberg Interactive and was planned to launch Mid-October in the US via Interactive Gaming Software (IGS). However this deal fell through and Star Ruler never launched in retail outlets in the United States.

== Gameplay ==
Star Ruler features a 1 to 10,000+ star system count galaxy of configurable shape. The size of the in-game universe is only limited by the processing power of the user's computer. Generated systems may have orbiting planets, moons, asteroids, comets, or aggressive, capturable, NPC assets. Gameplay occurs in a single space in real-time with the rate of time determined by the player. Star Ruler also features Newtonian mechanics in its ship movement.

Key differences from other games of the genre are: Detailed unit creation, behavior, and automation customization, physically modeled star systems and orbiting bodies, and a lack of traditional maintenance and unit count cap game mechanics.

== Ship building ==
One of Star Ruler's most impressive components is the ship construction. Each ship is built around a hull type. Different hulls will fulfil different purposes. For example, a Heavy hull is more resilient, but offers less space for components. A station hull is very resilient, and offers the most component space, but cannot mount engines. Each component can be scaled, and its effects scaled with it. For example, a 2.0 railgun will do half as much damage as a 4.0 railgun, which is the largest size, but will also consume half the power. Things like a bridge, life support, crew quarters, and power generators are necessary for most ships. The most unusual feature of Star Ruler's ship building system is the ability to scale ships. It is possible to build everything from a near microscopic scout ship to colossal dreadnoughts that are larger than a star.

== Sequel ==
A sequel Star Ruler 2 was announced on August 1, 2013 with a prospective launch date of late 2014.
