= Irrlicht Engine =

Computer game programming engine

Irrlicht 3D Engine
- Developer: Nikolaus Gebhardt et al.
- Stable release: 1.8.5 / 1 November 2021; 5 years ago
- Written in: C++
- Operating system: Cross-platform: Windows, Linux, macOS, Windows CE
- Type: Application framework
- License: zlib/libpng-based
- Website: irrlicht.sourceforge.io
- Repository: sourceforge.net/p/irrlicht/code

Irrlicht (German pronunciation [ˈɪʁlɪçt], English: will-o'-the-wisp) is an open-source game engine written in C++. It is cross-platform, officially running on Windows, macOS, Linux and Windows CE and due to its open nature ports to other systems are available, including FreeBSD, Xbox (up to Irrlicht version 1.8.1), PlayStation Portable, Symbian, iPhone, AmigaOS 4, Sailfish OS via a Qt/QML wrapper, and Google Native Client.

Irrlicht is known for its optimization and reliability in both newer and older hardware. It also offers easy learning, and a large friendly community. Unofficial bindings for many languages exist including AutoIt, C++Builder, FreeBASIC, GameMaker Language, Java, Lua, .NET, Object Pascal (Delphi), Perl, Python, and Ruby. However, most of them have not been maintained for more than five years.

Irrlicht's development began in 2003 with one developer, Nikolaus Gebhardt. Only after the 1.0 release of Irrlicht in 2006 did the team grow to ten members as of 2011, most of them being developers.

Irrlicht is a common German term for a will-o'-the-wisp.

== Features ==
Irrlicht supports 3D rendering via OpenGL, DirectX 8, 9 and internal software rasterizers. DirectX 8 is not supported after 1.8.1, effectively ending support for Xbox. External renderers and windowing systems plug in through simple interfaces, giving rise to a community-made Simple DirectMedia Layer (SDL) video driver and support for iPhone and Symbian devices. The engine comes with a library of standard material renderers, allowing fallback materials where user hardware is unable to handle advanced methods. New materials can be added to the engine at run-time, allowing users to write their own as needed. In addition to legacy fixed-function pipeline materials, programmable Pixel and Vertex Shaders (1.1 to 3.0 and 4.0 using GLSL), ARB Fragment and Vertex Programs, HLSL, Cg and GLSL materials are supported.

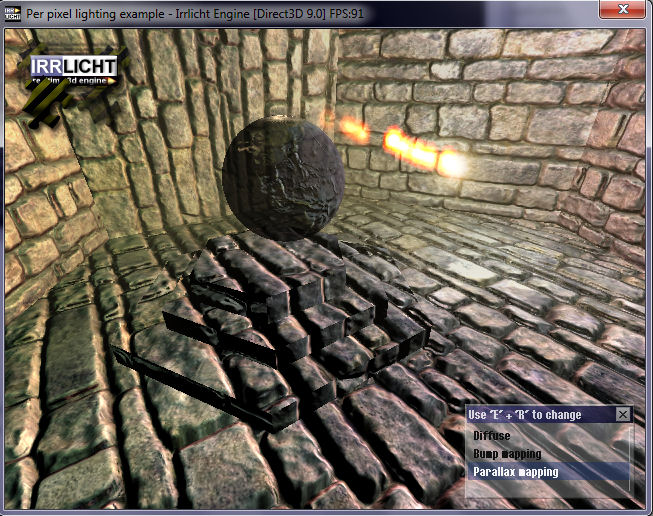
Per-pixel lighting in Irrlicht

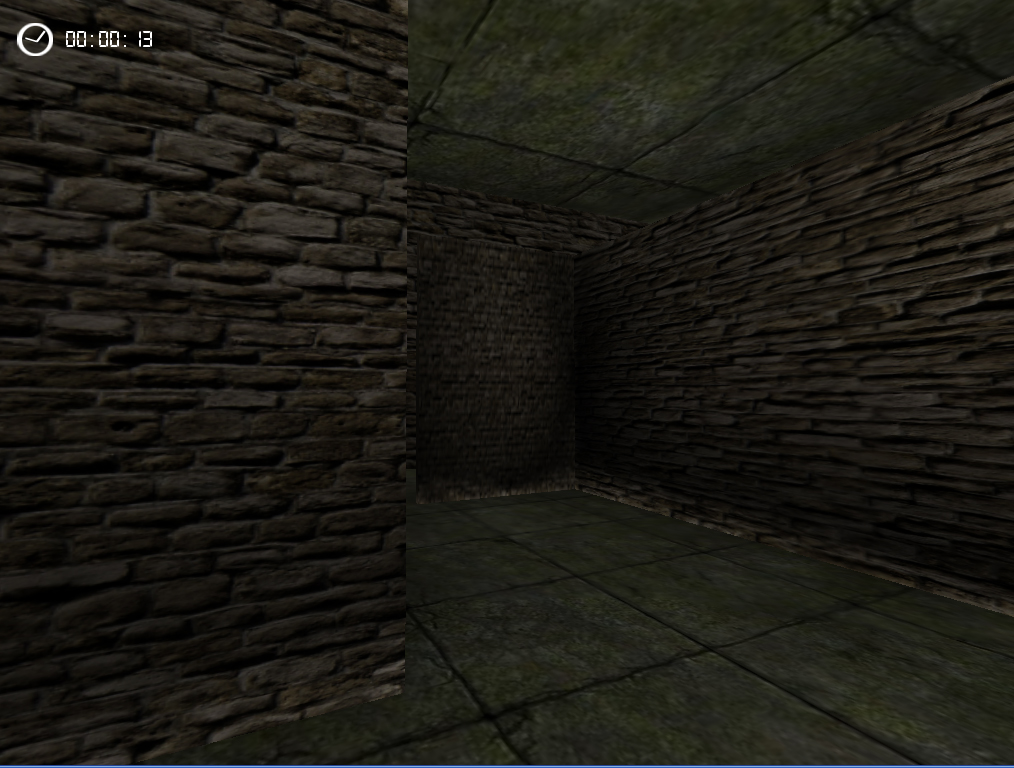
Lightmaps and vertex lighting in Irrlicht, rendering a simple dungeon scene

Irrlicht supports many file formats. It will load and display 3ds Max files, Quake 2 MD2 Models, Wavefront .obj objects, Quake 3 .bsp maps, Milkshape3D objects, and DirectX .x files. Additional format loaders have been written as external plugins. Lights, cameras and 3D objects are managed as a tree of Scene Nodes, arbitrary groupable entities linked together in a scene graph. These nodes are responsible for their own behaviour, but can also be managed by animators, each other, or manually by users.

Many built-in node types exist and can be used together to make complex indoor and outdoor scenes. New nodes are trivial to make and can be added at runtime; many additional node types are available from the community. Node types packaged with Irrlicht include a terrain renderer and sky domes-boxes for outdoor rendering, binary space partitioning (BSP) for indoor rendering, bone based animated meshes, stencil shadows, billboards and particle systems, water surfaces and primitives.

A skinnable 2D graphical user interface (GUI) is available, supporting many controls and the ability for users to plug in their own (or community made) custom widgets at runtime. Irrlicht's internal event system provides mouse, keyboard, joystick and GUI events without having to rely on additional libraries.

Filesystem access is abstracted allowing platform-independent file and folder access, and transparent access to files within ZIP archives. Other I/O features include an XML reader and writer, the ability to take screenshots, manipulate images and meshes and then save them in several different file formats.

Irrlicht provides support for simple collision detection including mouse picking, but users are advised that this is not intended as a replacement for a full featured physics engine.

== Engine extensions ==
Irrlicht was designed to be able to load and save the current scene to an XML file; this combined with the engine's open-source licensing model has attracted various programmers and developers to create world editors for Irrlicht to simplify the world-creation process. One such example is the irrEdit world editor, developed by Nikolaus Gebhardt and other members of the company Ambiera. IrrEdit contains a radiosity lightmap generator and a scripting interface using Squirrel scripts.

Since Irrlicht does not support sound by itself, Ambiera has also developed irrKlang, a non-free, proprietary audio library with an API similar to Irrlicht. Being developed by the same group, irrEdit supports the use of sounds in levels made by irrEdit for use with irrKlang-enabled compiled DLLs. Also, among Ambiera's creations is irrXML, Irrlicht's XML parser.

Many physics libraries have had plugins and wrappers written for Irrlicht, including Nvidia PhysX, Bullet, and Open Dynamics Engine.

More extensions can be found in the Irrlicht forums and in the irrExt project, a side-project of Irrlicht for special purpose add-ons.

There are also some new technologies in forums such as Deferred shading or Shadow mapping. Many users contribute extensions such as Compute Shaders (OpenGL 4.3) and Tessellation Shaders (Shader Model 5.0).

== Projects using it ==
- Arena of Honor, 3D deathmatch first-person shooter.
- Amulet of tricolor, a 2D game
- Bolzplatz 2006 by Xenoage Software, a soccer game.
- Bugsnax, a monster collection adventure game.
- Build A World EDU, an educational scenario-based game, but it uses its own extremely modified and stripped-down version of Irrlicht.
- Craft The World 2014 by Dekovir Entertainment, a sandbox game that combine mechanics from Terraria and Dungeon Keeper games.
- Eve, a robot simulator by the Biologically Inspired Robotics Group (BIRG) at the Swiss Federal Institute of Technology in Lausanne.
- Galactic Dream: Rage of War, a commercial space strategy game by Evolution Vault.
- Gekkeiju Online, a gratuitous fantasy multi user role playing game.
- H-Craft Championship, an open source sci-fi racing game
- irrlamb, a 3D physics game
- Minetest, a voxel-based, open-world video game similar to Minecraft. This uses the Luanti engine which is officially a fork of Irrlicht.
- Octodad: Dadliest Catch, a comedic fatherhood simulator
- Project Chrono
- Schwarzerblitz, a 3-D fighting game released in 2019 for Windows PC. It is heavily inspired by Dead or Alive and Soulcalibur.
- Sokoban Challenge, a 3D remake of the classic puzzle game Sokoban for Android.
- Star Ruler, a 4X game in space
- SuperTuxKart (since version 0.7), a 3D kart racing game; though since version 0.9, STK uses an extremely heavily modified version of Irrlicht, including a whole new OpenGL 3-based renderer called "Antarctica".
- Tetris (iOS version), a Tetris game from EA Mobile.
- The End Of Dyeus, an open-world adventure game

== See also ==
- OGRE
- OpenSceneGraph
- Panda3D
- Delta3D
- Crystal Space
- Visualization Library
