= Star Ruler 2 =

2015 video game

- Developer(s): Blind Mind Studios
- Publisher(s): Blind Mind Studios
- Platform(s): Microsoft Windows; Linux
- Release: NA: 2015
- Genre(s): 4X; real-time strategy
- Mode(s): Single-player; multiplayer

Star Ruler 2 is a hybrid real-time strategy and 4X video game developed and published by Blind Mind Studios. It was released in 2015 and is the sequel to Star Ruler. The game can still be bought via digital distribution, but Blind Mind released the game's source code in 2018 as open source. This includes all the game's assets except the music.

== Gameplay ==
Star Ruler 2 blends elements of 4X and real-time strategy games. The game is pausable but is real time. Players control a space empire in galaxies that can include dozens of other empires, each comprising an alien species that can be customized. The empires meet in a galactic senate, where players can expend influence to affect the game, such as annexing a competitor's territory. Influence is built up over time and is spent using a card-based minigame. Each empires is allocated a yearly budget. Money not spent is redirected to research and social programs. Resources are claimed by settling planets, and planets can form complex economic networks. If the player develops their empire in such a way that it is dependent on a rare resource, losing the planet that provides that resource can cripple their empire. Fleets are represented by flagships, which the player can move around the map. The number of flagships is theoretically unlimited. Space ships can be customized, and there is no limit to their size.

== Reception ==
PC Gamer included it in a list of the best 4X games for the PC, recommending it for players fond of large space battles. Jonathan Bolding of The Escapist wrote, "Star Ruler 2 delivers a unique, fascinating experience despite its reliance on sometimes obtuse systems." The game received a positive review from German site 4Players.
