= Octodad: Dadliest Catch =

2014 video game

- Developer: Young Horses
- Publisher: Young Horses
- Director: Kevin Zuhn
- Producer: Kevin Geisler
- Designers: Majdi Badri; John Murphy; Seth Parker; Kevin Zuhn
- Programmers: Kevin Geisler; Devon Scott-Tunkin
- Artist: Chris Stallman
- Writers: Kevin Zuhn; Majdi Badri
- Composers: Seth Parker; Ian McKinney
- Engine: Irrlicht Engine
- Platforms: Android; iOS; Linux; Microsoft Windows; Nintendo Switch; OS X; PlayStation 4; PlayStation Vita; tvOS; Wii U; Xbox One
- Release: Microsoft Windows, OS X, Linux: WW: January 30, 2014; PlayStation 4: NA: April 22, 2014; PAL: April 23, 2014; PlayStation Vita: NA: May 26, 2015; PAL: May 28, 2015; Xbox One: WW: August 26, 2015; Wii U: NA: October 29, 2015; EU: October 30, 2015; AU: January 15, 2016; iOS: WW: October 29, 2015; Android: WW: November 4, 2015; Nintendo Switch: NA: November 9, 2017; PAL: November 9, 2017
- Genre: Adventure
- Modes: Single-player, multiplayer

Octodad: Dadliest Catch is an independent adventure video game developed and published by Young Horses. It is a sequel to the 2010 freeware game Octodad. The game consists of controlling the protagonist Octodad in completing chores typical of the mundane suburban father, but complicated by the fact that he is an octopus in disguise.

== Gameplay ==
In the 'Octodad' series, the player takes the role of an octopus attempting to mimic a human, with otherwise mundane tasks made difficult by attempting to maneuver the octopus' tentacles as limbs.

Octodad: Dadliest Catch requires the player to control the protagonist, Octodad, as he maneuvers his way through increasingly complex challenges all while attempting to hide the fact that he is a cephalopod in human clothing. The player can control one of two sets of tentacles, mimicking arms and legs, switching between the two with a single button. The player is able to pick up and throw loose items as well, through manipulation of these tentacles. To maintain Octodad's identity, the player must avoid causing too much chaos in moving the character around while in sight of certain non-player characters, like guards or scientists, as tracked by a gauge in the game; how quickly these characters catch on is set by the game's difficulty level. If the gauge becomes full, the player will be forced to restart at a recent checkpoint. The game is divided into several levels with various objectives to be completed to progress in a level. For example, in a supermarket, the player must collect several grocery items before being given their next task. A multiplayer co-op mode is also available where up to four players control four limbs.

== Plot ==
Set after the events of the original game, Dadliest Catch features Octodad working around the house, going grocery shopping, and accompanying his family on a visit to the local aquarium at his wife Scarlet's request, much to his chagrin. As before, he must spend time with his wife and children while not arousing the suspicion of other humans, including the evil Chef Fujimoto, who knows Octodad's secret and seeks to expose and cook him.

A series of flashbacks also explains how Octodad originally took on a human identity, met Scarlet, and eventually married her. Eventually, Chef Fujimoto throws Octodad into the shark tank and kidnaps his family, trying to convince them that Octodad is an octopus. Octodad escapes and shows up without his disguise, revealing the truth to his family, though his daughter Stacy admits she knew the entire time. Fujimoto tries to kill Octodad, but is incapacitated by Octodad and his family. Octodad, however, forgives Fujimoto, and they make amends. The family comes together, with Tommy and Scarlet looking toward a hopeful future with their new knowledge of Octodad.

The credits play on a theatre screen, with the player having free rein over popcorn and the theatre seats. Two bonus chapters were released under the name "Octodad Shorts". These include a flashback recounting Octodad and Scarlet's first date, and a story Tommy and Stacy are making up about Octodad working in a hospital as a nurse as a reference to Surgeon Simulator.

== Development ==
The original Octodad was developed by a team of DePaul University game design students as an extracurricular activity. Following their graduation in 2011, eight of the original team of eighteen decided to pursue a sequel as a commercial project, and together with a new external member, formed the company Young Horses. Members of the original student team who did not join Young Horses signed over the rights to Octodad in return for company stock and a share of the sequel's royalties.

Young Horses launched a Kickstarter crowdfunding campaign to finance a sequel, originally titled Octodad 2. Their campaign was successful and they raised US$24,320 in August 2011. Six of the team lived and worked together in a shared apartment; this made collaboration more effective than in a virtual team, but frustrations over space constraints led to the team moving into two neighbouring apartments instead. Though the original Kickstarter campaign aimed to have the game released in 2012, the game did not release until January 2014, under the name Octodad: Dadliest Catch. The development time for the game was 2 years and 7 months. Additional free downloadable content, titled "Octodad Shorts", were released on October 14, 2014.

A PlayStation Vita port of the game was released on May 26, 2015, completed chiefly by Sickhead Games. A port of the game for the Wii U was released in October 2015, with Panic Button helping with the port. Ports for iOS and Android with brand new touch-based controls were released in October and November 2015 respectively. A port for the Nintendo Switch was released on November 9, 2017.

== Reception ==
Reception

Aggregate scores
Aggregator	Score
GameRankings	(PS4) 74.27% (PC) 70.92%
Metacritic	(PS4) 69/100 (PC) 69/100

Review scores
Publication	Score
Destructoid	8/10
Eurogamer	7/10
Game Informer	5.75/10
GameSpot	6/10
GamesRadar+	3.5/5
GameTrailers	8/10
Giant Bomb	4/5
IGN	7.8/10
Joystiq	3/5
VideoGamer.com	8/10

Octodad: Dadliest Catch received mixed reviews from critics. Metacritic, which assigns a normalised rating in the 0–100 range, calculated an average score of 69 out of 100, indicating "mixed or average reviews", based on 31 reviews for the PlayStation 4 version and 44 reviews for the PC version.

GameSpot's Carolyn Petit scored the game a 6/10. She liked the way the controls made the game humorous and provided a good challenge, but thought that over the course of the game, the gameplay became a less enjoyable experience and developed into a chore. She also disliked the game's short length, as she thought it made the game feel like an incomplete demo or teaser, rather than a full game. Petit praised the game's visual design and concept, however, as she enjoyed the way the "absurd" protagonist was placed in ordinary, everyday situations.

Eurogamer's Dan Whitehead wrote: "Octodad is frequently laugh-out-loud hilarious, thanks both to the random mayhem and the deft script. It's also a surprisingly sweet game with a genuine depth to its main character. We've all felt awkward and out of place at some point, or have some aspect of ourselves we keep hidden away for fear those we love will reject us. To its credit, and for all its cartoon silliness, Octodad doesn't treat that concept lightly. It's a shame Octodad leans so heavily on traditional gameplay tropes like boss fights and stealth sections in its second half, especially when the opening sections suggest something quirkier and more inventive - but taken as a whole, it's still a minor triumph." Whitehead scored the game a 7/10.

VideoGamer.com's Dan Douglas scored the game an 8/10 and stated: "Octodad is an engaging, unique game which crashes the everyday and the uncanny head-on with aplomb, and one particularly enjoyable to onlookers. Simple tasks inevitably degenerate into Buster Keaton-evoking farces – with soundtrack nods to silent film accompanists to boot – and my only gripes with Dadliest Catch are an occasionally wayward camera and a few cruel difficulty spikes necessitating repetition of short sections ad nauseam. Otherwise, it's a blast."

Hollander Cooper of GamesRadar gave the game a positive review, with a score of 3.5 out of 5. He praised the game's concept, humour, music, controls, protagonist, and unique gameplay, but criticized the short length and the stealth sections. Cooper summed up the review by saying: "It might be brief, but Octodad is definitely worth checking out for anyone interested in a charming, hilarious experience."

Matt Miller from Game Informer scored the game a 5.75 out of 10. He said the "cartoonish characters and bright colors are simple and inviting", enjoyed the "humorous" voice work and "chipper" music, and considered the game mildly amusing. Miller disliked the "awful" controls because he felt he was always at odds with the movement of the protagonist. He also thought the "clever" humour eventually wore thin when the tougher objectives set in. Miller stated "It pains me to level a harsh judgment against a game that's trying something new and innovative, but Octodad doesn't balance the frustration with the funny."

In his positive review for IGN, Cam Shea scored the game a 7.8/10. His highest praise was given to the game's unique brand of comedy, which he saw as the game's defining feature. He also praised the story; he called it "touching" and praised the game's ability to tell an emotional tale, despite being filled with absurdities. Shea thought the overall gameplay offered variety, and kept the player from being bored, despite it lacking a challenge and featuring certain unpleasant levels.

As of February 2015, the game has sold 460,000 units and made US$4.9 million of revenue. Over one million copies had been sold by June 2016.

== Legacy ==
Octodad appears as a hidden playable character in the racing game SpeedRunners. He is also a playable character in the indie fighting games Indie Pogo and Fraymakers. Octodad was also included as a DLC costume in LittleBigPlanet 3. Octodad has a cameo in Astro Bot as one of the VIP bots to be rescued.

Octodad is also included in Tony Hawk's Pro Skater 5 and Team Fortress 2 as an unlockable Create-A-Skater cosmetic and a purchase bonus respectively.
