= Gekkeiju Online =

2003 video game

- Developer(s): Coolhouse Productions
- Engine: Irrlicht
- Platform(s): Microsoft Windows
- Genre(s): MMORPG
- Mode(s): Multiplayer

Gekkeiju Online (月桂樹:オンライン, Gekkeiju:Onrain; Gekkeiju is the Japanese word for Bay Laurel) was a 3D MMORPG developed by a Finnish indie software company, Coolhouse Productions in 2003. The game incorporated anime-style characters into a medieval fantasy world.

Gekkeiju Online was a GameOgre.com online game of the week, highlighting the MUD-style gameplay which is considered more in-depth than regular MMORPGs.

A completely redone version of Gekkeiju Online launched to public beta test in January 2010.

The project is no longer operational, with its website displaying an error page from May 16, 2020, changing to a simple message stating "Project may be rebooted at later date" from August 13, 2020 onwards.

== Gameplay ==
The game's character options consisted of nine playable character races, each with their own advantages and disadvantages. The playable races were: humans, elves, halflings, half-giants, dwarves, wild elves, dark elves, goblins and catfolk. It was possible to change the race during playing through reincarnation offered by various NPCs in game.

There were 5 character classes in Gekkeiju Online: warrior, commoner, magic user, divine arts and dark arts. Each of the character classes had its own set of guilds that could be joined to learn skills and spells. The character class also decided the skills and spells character learned automatically during the first 10 levels.

- Warrior was basic fighter class, with guilds specializing in melee, ranged attacks and animal taming. New players always started as warriors.
- Commoners were a combinations of spell casters and fighters. Their guilds included bards and merchants.
- Magic Users were the strongest users of magic, with ability to learn spells from defensive to offensive.
- Divine Arts were a spellcaster class that used divine spiritual magic such as healing-spells. Divine arts could also learn some combat skills.
- Dark Arts were the evil counterpart of divine arts. Dark Arts spells were focused on damage used to supplement melee combat skill. Their guilds included death knights and fallen priests.

== Awards ==
- GameOgre's Game of the Week
- Winner of Irrlicht's March 2009 Screenshot of the Month-competition
- Winner of Irrlicht's Screenshot of the Year 2009-competition

== See also ==
- List of MMORPGs
