= Luanti =

Free and open-source voxel game engine

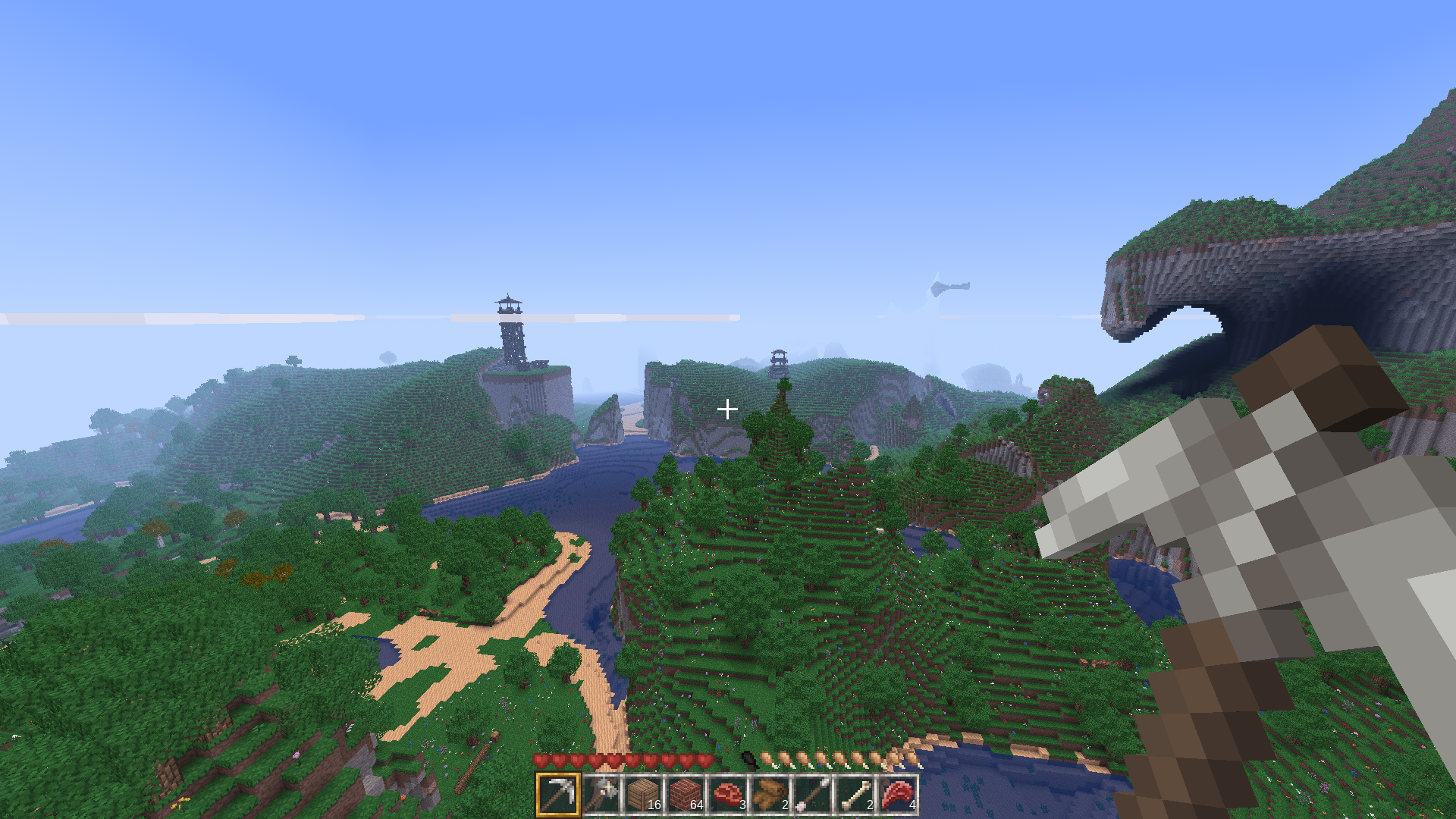
- A screenshot of scenery from the VoxeLibre game made with Luanti
- Original author: Perttu Ahola
- Developer: The Luanti Team
- Release: 0.0.1 / 2 November 2010; 15 years ago
- Stable release: 5.17.0 / 21 August 2026
- Written in: C++, Lua
- Engine: Irrlicht (Irrlicht-MT fork)
- Platform: Microsoft Windows, MacOS, Linux, FreeBSD, Android
- License: 2013: LGPL-2.1-or-later; 2010: GPL-2.0-or-later; Original: Proprietary
- Website: www.luanti.org
- Repository: github.com/luanti-org/luanti

Luanti (formerly known as Minetest) is a community-driven, free and open-source voxel game engine, available on various platforms. Originally, Minetest was a voxel game created in October 2010 by Perttu Ahola to explore the mechanics of Minecraft. Over time, Luanti evolved from the original Minetest game into a general game engine as developers integrated new features.

Luanti allows for the creation, development, and customization of games and modules (shortened to mods) using its Lua scripting system. Games are collections of mods that together establish a complete gameplay experience (by defining major content and behavior), while individual mods serve to modify or complement specific features within games, and may be added, replaced, or removed by players to customize them. To download games and mods, Luanti provides a built-in browser to access ContentDB, through which they can be installed.

Despite its origins, the community considers Luanti a game engine rather than a singular game, as it no longer offers any playable content without third-party games and mods. Luanti itself is based on the Irrlicht engine.

Luanti's name is a portmanteau formed from Lua (the scripting language) and the Finnish word luonti, meaning "creation".

== Overview ==
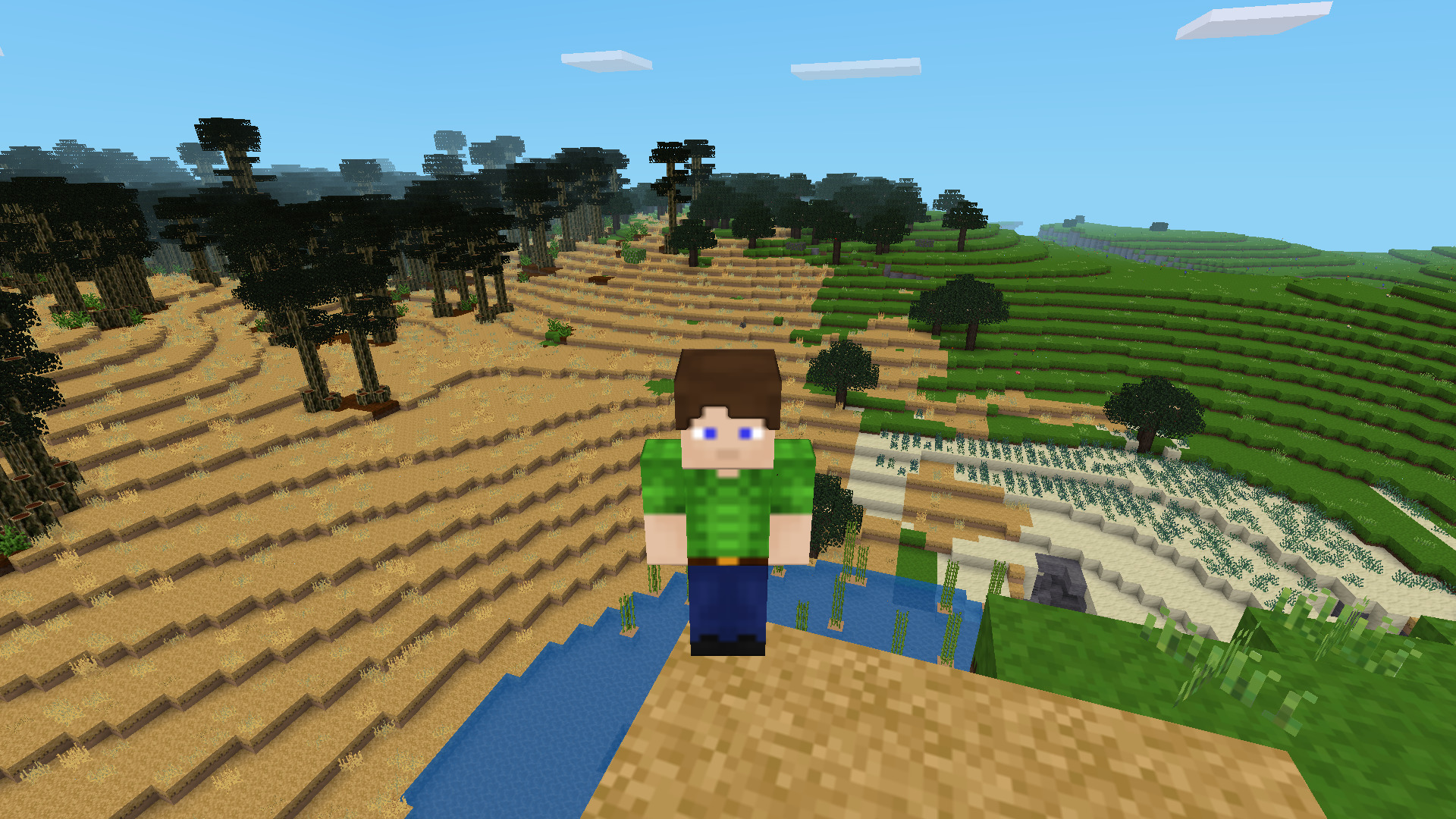
Player character Sam near dry plains, green plains, and jungle biomes in Minetest 5.3.0

Games installed on Luanti can be played through worlds, formed using 3D voxels called nodes, which function like digital building blocks. Scenery is created by using nodes to represent various types of landscape or immobile objects, such as land, water, trees, and rocks. Conversely, animated (moving) beings, often referred to as mobs or NPCs (characters controlled by the game) can be created to interact with the player and the world. Luanti allows users to create their own scenery and mobs, or they can use packages that have been created by other users; these content creators are referred to as modders or developers.

A primary example of a game which consists of real-world biomes with a variety of mobs that can spawn is VoxeLibre. Such games often have numerous game mechanics which allow for multiple player-set objectives such as building houses, farming, smelting, and cooking.

On the other hand, games that include no mobs or clear game objectives, such as Minetest Game (MTG) also exist, being designed to be modding bases with sets of nodes and pre-generated biomes.

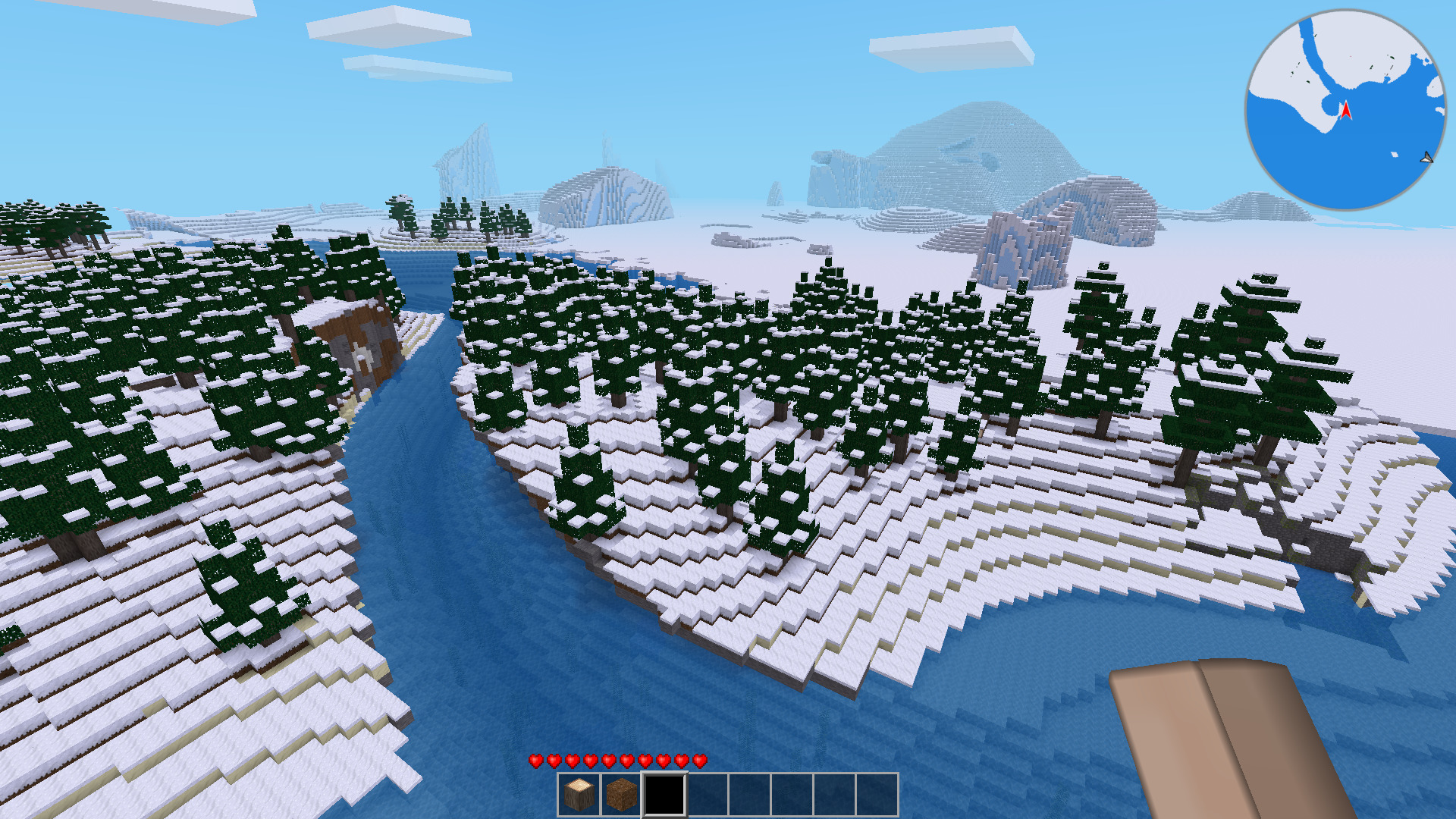
Snowy conifer biome at the edge of ice plains in first person mode in Minetest 5.3.0

As players explore an in-game world, new areas are procedurally generated (created using an algorithm) using a map seed optionally specified by the player. A new game puts the player in the center of a map spanning tens of thousands of nodes (62 000), a scale large enough that most players will rarely reach the edges. An invisible wall exists at every edge of the world (including down and up), preventing players from leaving.

Most worlds in major games are divided into biomes ranging from deserts to jungles to snowfields; the terrain can include plains, mountains, forests, caves, water, or even lava, depending on the game and mod installed. The in-game time system follows a day and night cycle, with one full cycle lasting 20 real-time minutes by default.

Luanti provides two play-style options across games: Enable Damage and Creative Mode. Disabling damage prevents taking damage and dying, thus losing items and any possible frustrations it may cause, while Creative Mode provides players with infinite resources to build whatever they want without having to gather them first.

=== Multiplayer ===
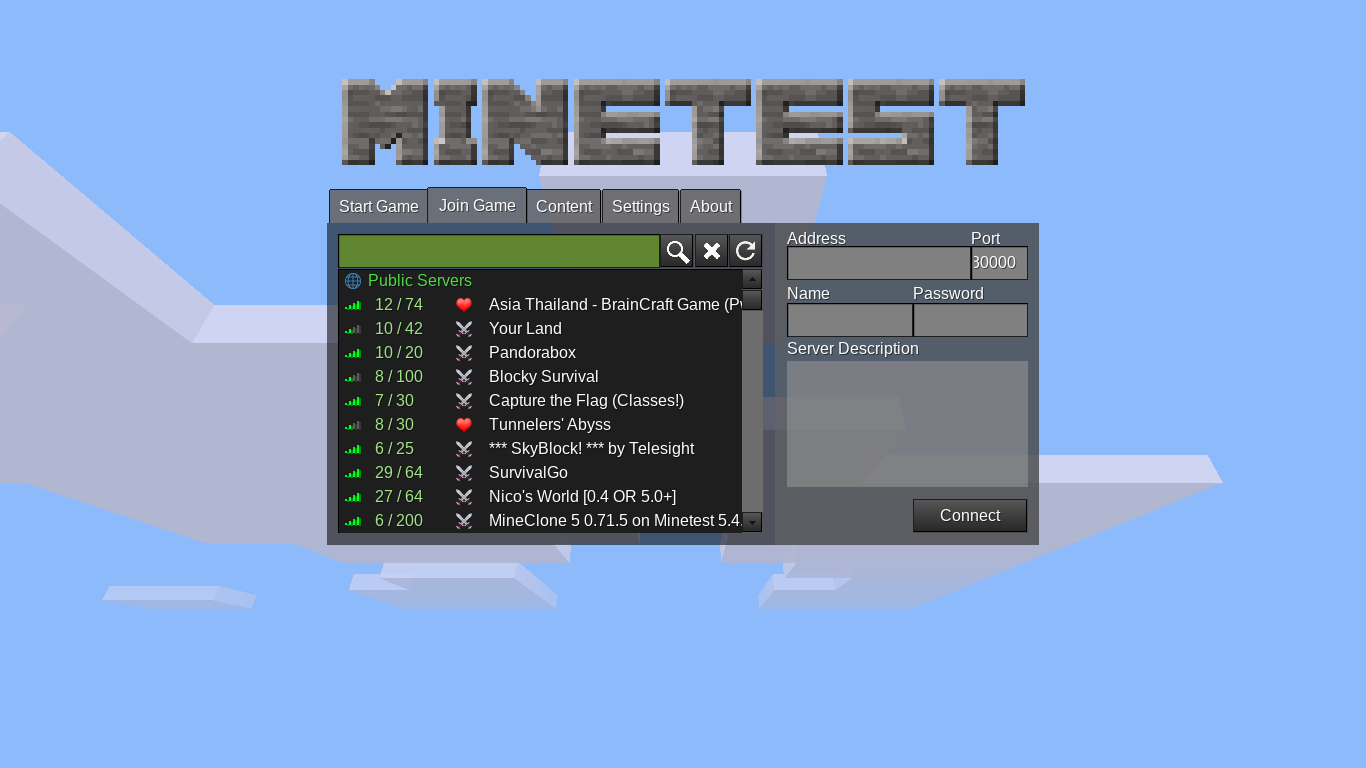
Built-in Internet server browser in Minetest 5.5.0

Luanti allows players to play together over the internet or the local network by joining a server or hosting their own.

Players can either connect by IP or select the server from the built-in server browser if the host chooses to publish it there by selecting the checkbox.

Rather than the centralized account systems typically used by proprietary games across multiple game servers, Luanti allows registering and logging into accounts on each individual server, thereby allowing players to have multiple different accounts on each server, entirely separate from each other.

=== Game development and customization ===
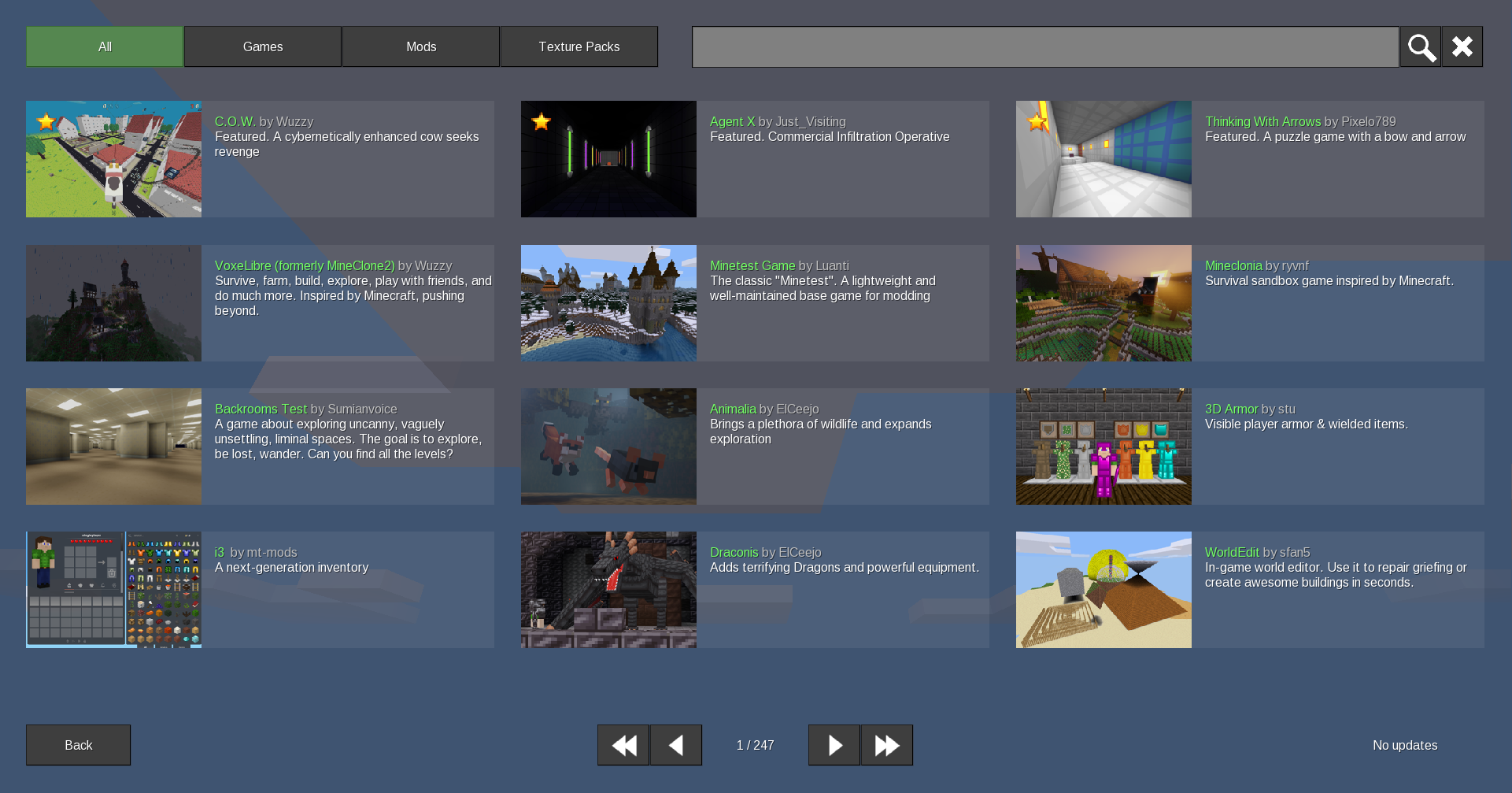
Built-in content browser

Luanti gives developers the ability to create games and mods using Lua, a beginner-friendly programming language. Mods can be freely added, removed, or replaced within any game, giving players a simple and intuitive way to customize games to their liking.

When playing in Multiplayer, mods can be chosen to run automatically on game servers, such that players don't need to install them manually. Mods can be used to add or modify nodes, gameplay mechanics, tools, weapons, armour, monsters, player skins and the user interface.

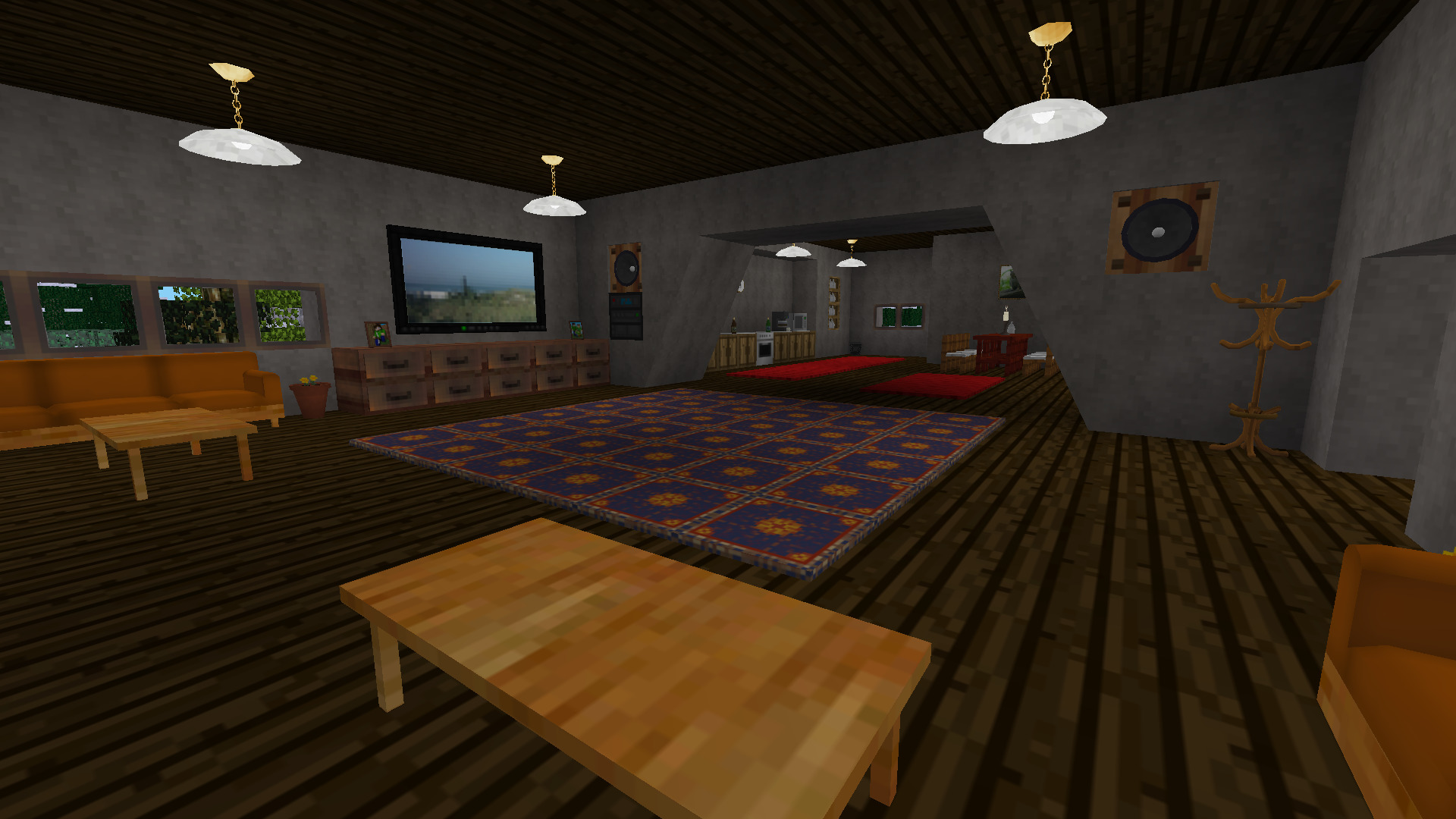
Interior design using Home Decor mod

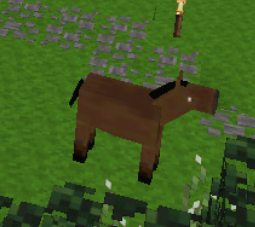
A horse from the Mob Horse mod

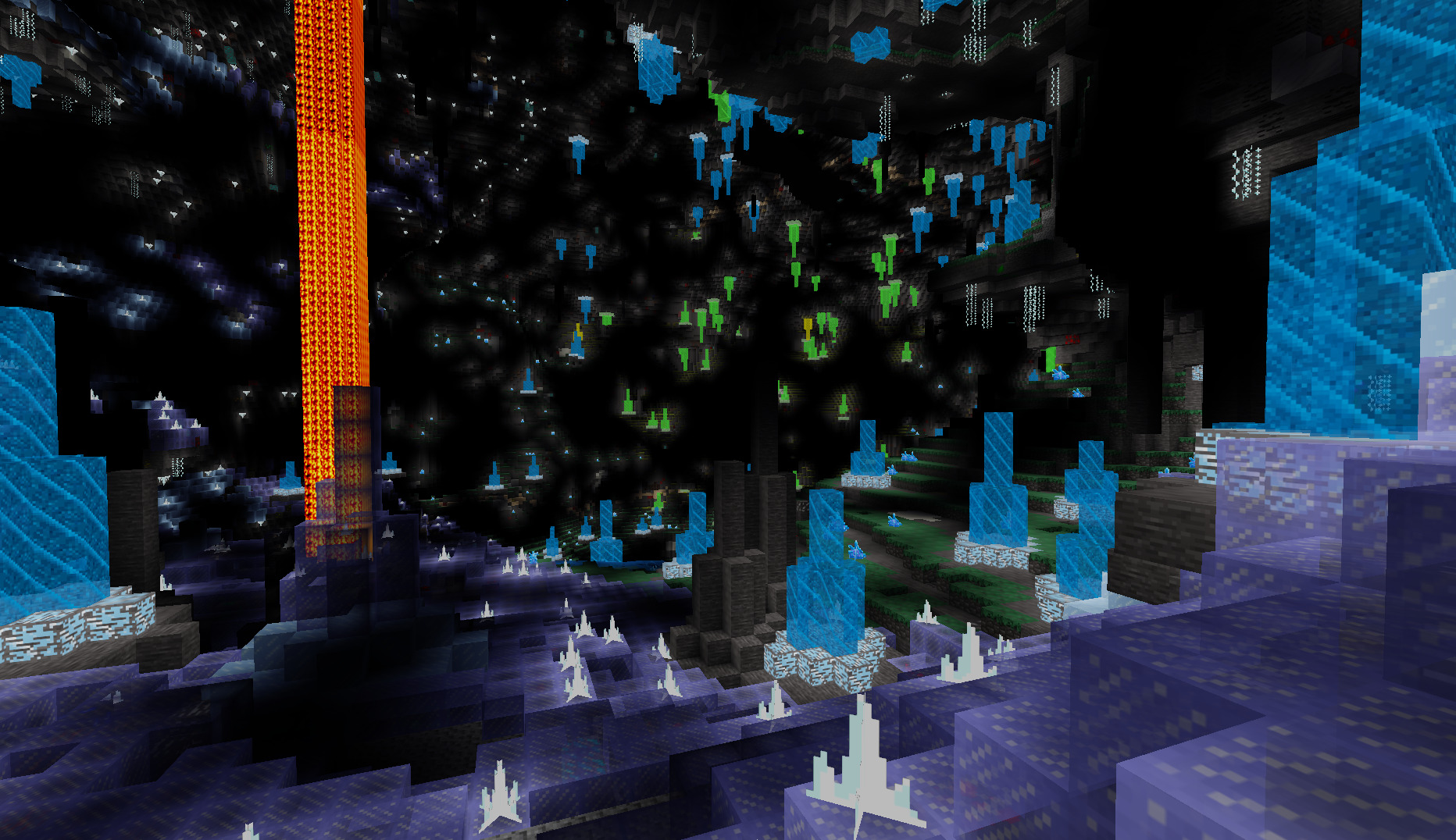
Crystal cave biome generated by Underground Realms mod

Luanti features a built-in content browser showing packages uploaded to ContentDB, allowing users to install games, mods and texture packs with a single click. Thousands of packages are currently available, with many more accessible on the forums. The five most popular games by downloads are VoxeLibre, Minetest Game, Mineclonia, Backrooms Test, and NodeCore.

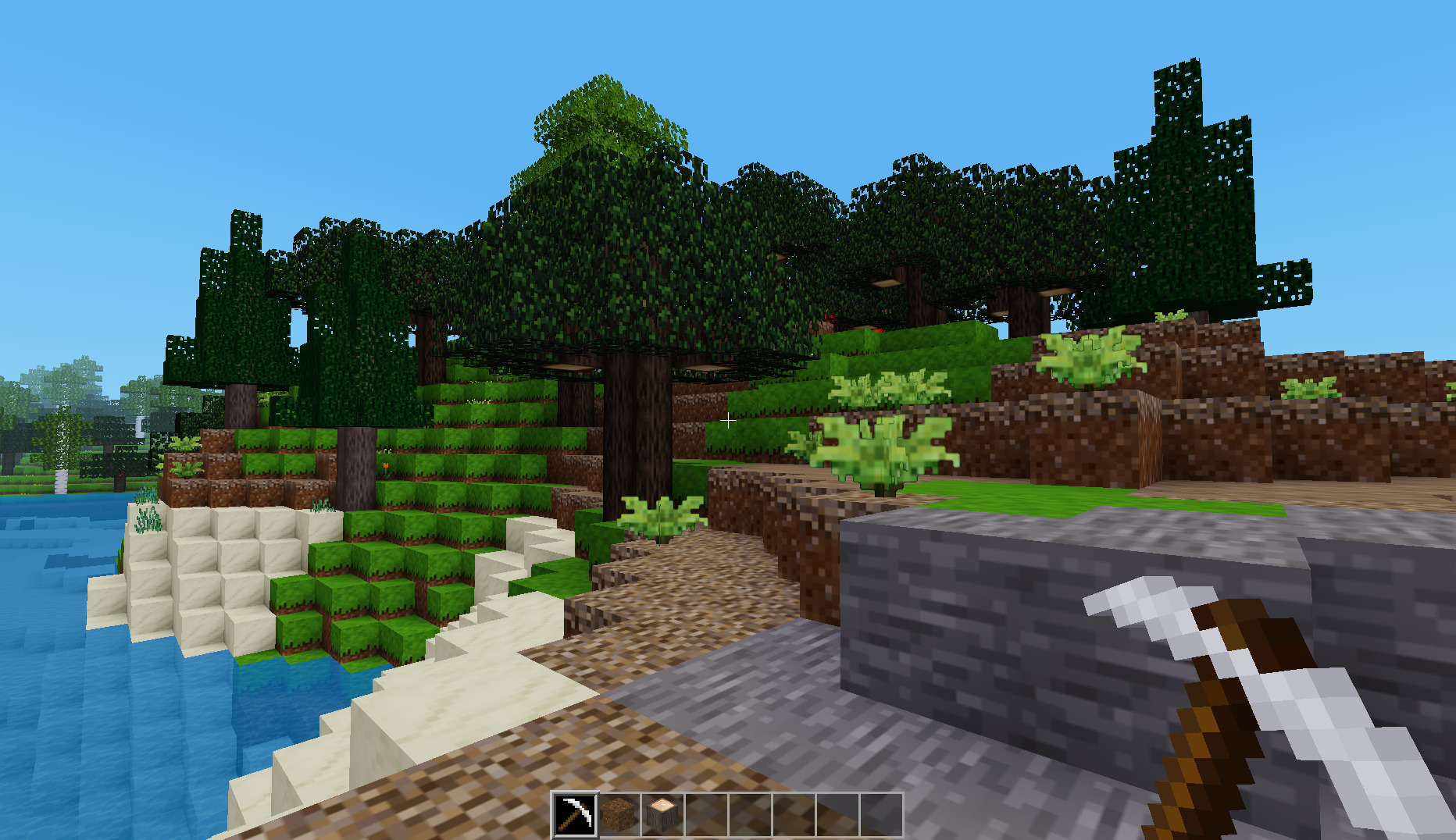
Default texture pack shipped with Minetest 5.3.0

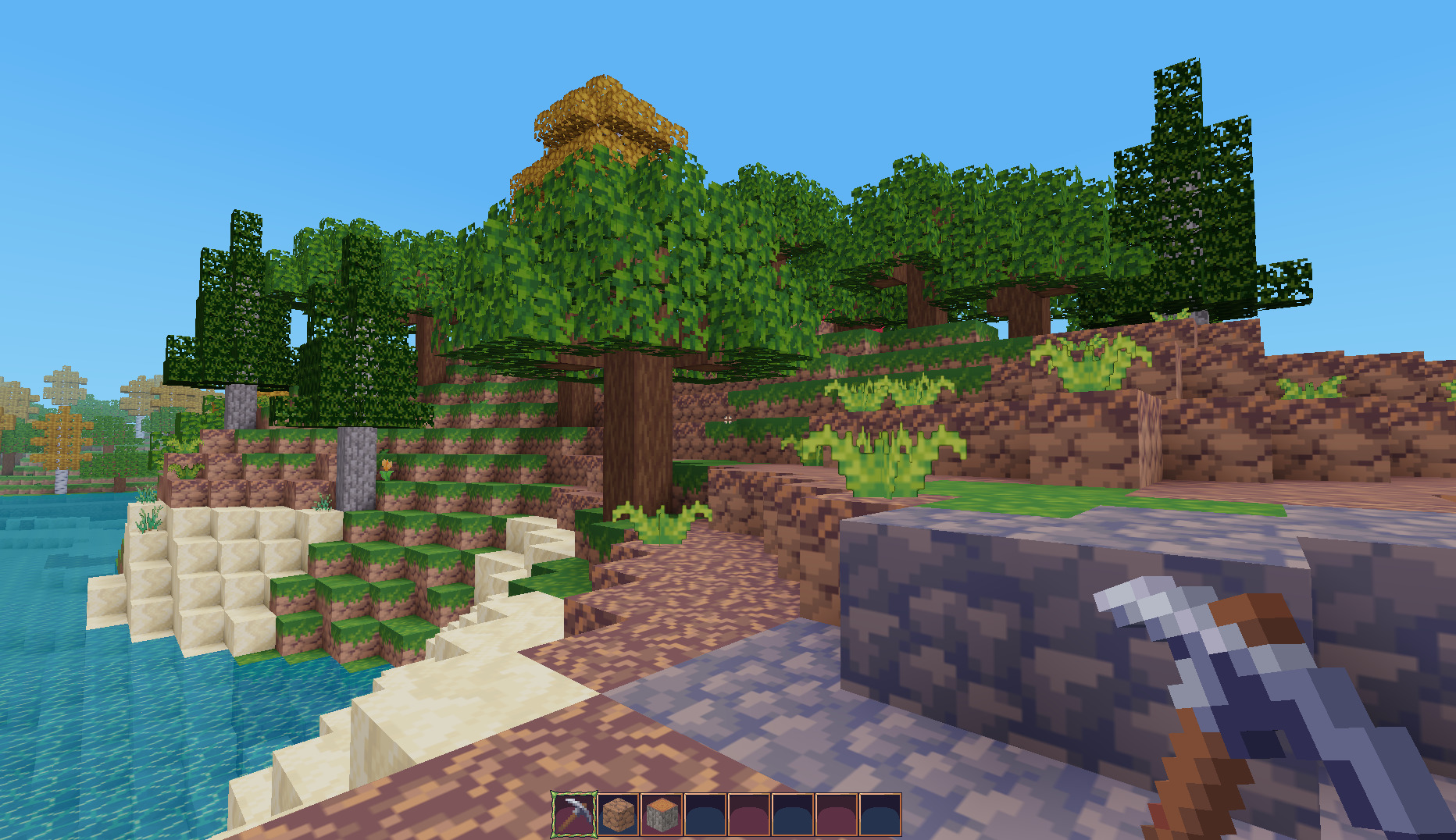
"RPG16" texture pack

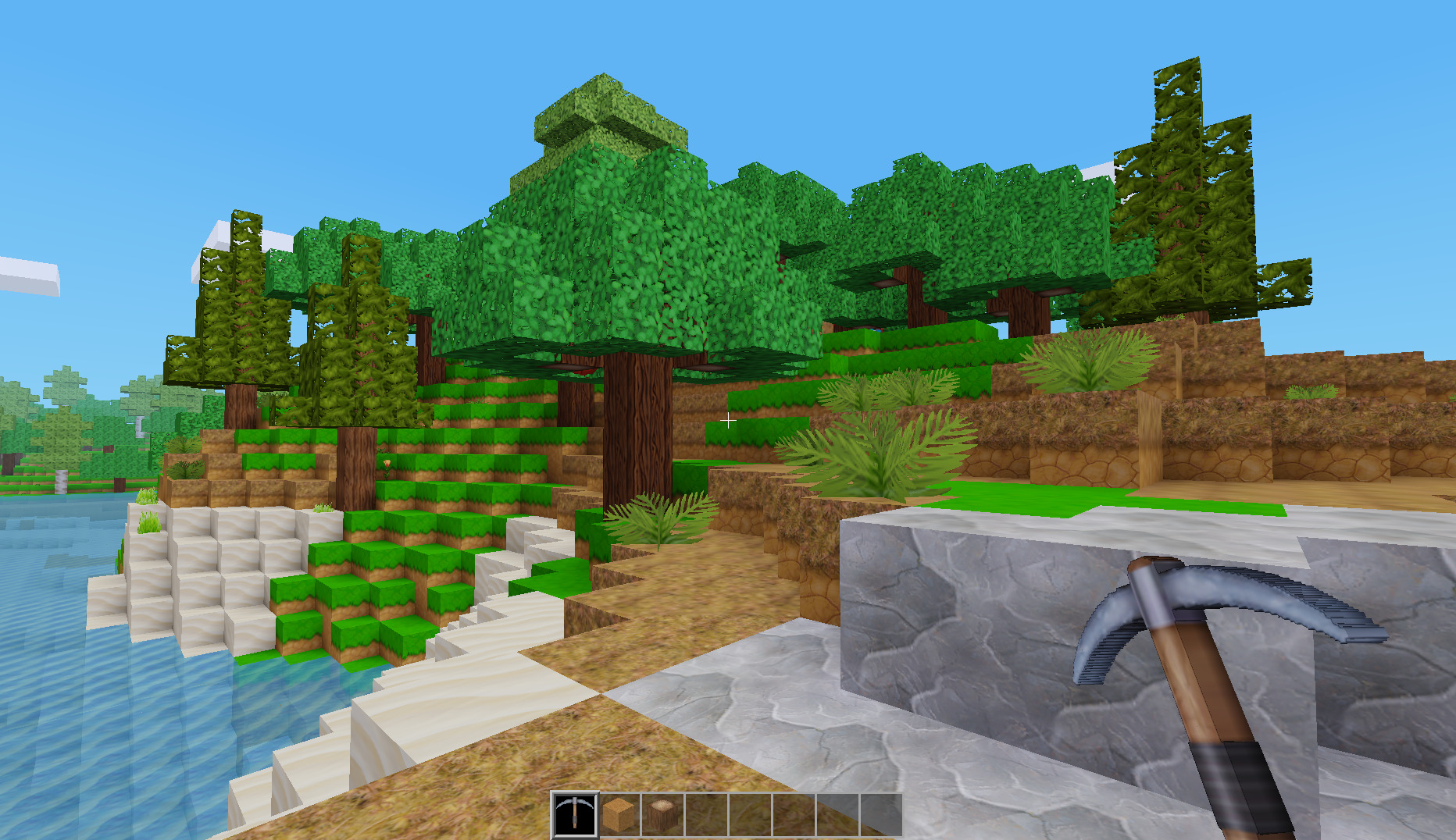
"Hand Painted" texture pack

The full source code of Luanti, as well as most of its games, mods, and their assets (such as textures and sounds), are distributed under free licenses, making it easy to publish modified versions and derivatives.

== Development ==
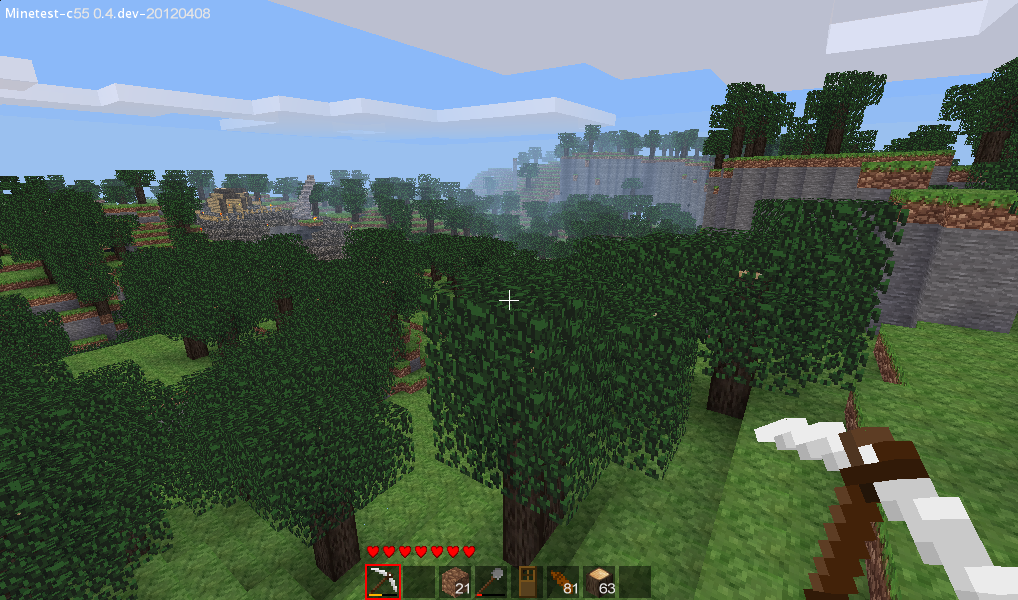
Minetest-c55 0.4.dev, 8 April 2012 build

Luanti was originally released in November 2010 under a proprietary license. Shortly afterwards the license was changed to the GPL-2.0-or-later license. By agreement among major contributors, in June 2012 the project license was changed to LGPL-2.1-or-later, though at the time small parts still remained under the GPL-2.0-or-later license. In September 2013, the transition to LGPL-2.1-or-later was completed. While LGPL-2.1-or-later remains the main license for the Luanti engine, other free and open-source licenses are used for various other parts of the latest releases.

Finnish programmer Perttu Ahola (recognized as celeron55 or c55) was the only developer working on the project for about six months after its creation, until Ciaran Gultnieks started making code contributions in May 2011. The roster of contributors grew and changed over the years. As of January 2026, Luanti's GitHub repository has more than 800 contributors (870 as of September 2026). Project participants do not have set roles, but rather keep their activity within their respective areas of expertise. Perttu Ahola's role morphed over the years: whereas initially it was engine development, it is now mostly web-hosting and administration, assigning core developer, moderator, and other roles to people, as well as being the final word in cases where other developers are unable to render a decision.

Version 5.0.0 added an in-game browser that lets users download games and modifications as well as their dependencies from a Luanti's ContentDB website. Version 5.5.0 forked the Irrlicht Engine.

Prior to version 5.8.0, Luanti shipped a default game called Minetest Game, a practice which was ended due to concerns that new players would mistake Luanti for a single game instead of an engine. Despite no longer being officially shipped with Luanti, Minetest Game can still be found on ContentDB.

In October 2024, the project’s name was officially changed from Minetest to Luanti. The new name combines Lua (the scripting language) with the Finnish word luonti, meaning "creation".

== Usage in education ==
Luanti has been used in educational environments to teach subjects such as mathematics, programming, and earth sciences. Some notable examples include:

- In 2017, some French schools began using Luanti to teach calculus and trigonometry.
- In 2016, at the Federal University of Santa Catarina in Brazil, a variant of Luanti called "MineScratch" was used to teach programming.
- In 2018, for Laboratory Education and Apprenticeships (EDA) at the Paris Descartes University, Luanti was used to teach life and Earth sciences to year 6 students who could not observe some phenomena in person but could experience them in the Luanti virtual world.

== Reception ==
Opensource.com listed Luanti at #1 in its "Best open source games of 2015", stating that it is maybe "the most complete alternative to Minecraft", and noted its expansibility, saying that it contains a user-friendly API for creating mods in Lua. PC Magazine listed Luanti among "The best Sandbox Creation Games for Minecraft Fans".

== DMCA takedown controversy ==
In August 2026, Luanti's mobile app was removed from the Google Play Store following a DMCA takedown notice filed on 14 August by Tracer.ai on behalf of Microsoft, which claimed that Luanti infringed copyrights of Minecraft, more specifically copyrighted game assets. On 27 August 2026, the Luanti team addressed the situation, stating that the notice was baseless, as Luanti does not ship or contain any proprietary code or assets. The DMCA complaint was later rescinded sometime between 28 August and 5 September, with the Luanti team officially stating on 8 September 2026 that the DMCA takedown notice was withdrawn and the engine was restored to the Google Play Store.

== See also ==
- List of open-source video games
- Open-source video game
- Linux gaming
- Minecraft
