= Marcel Vos =

Dutch YouTuber

YouTube information
- Channel: Marcel Vos
- Years active: 8
- Genre: Video games
- Subscribers: 195K
- Views: 69 million
- Last updated: 20 August 2026

Marcel Vos is a Dutch RollerCoaster Tycoon analyst and YouTuber. Vos is known for creating in-depth videos on the technical mechanics of OpenRCT2 and its predecessors. He lives in the town of Meppel in the Netherlands.

== Work ==
Vos' first video was uploaded in March 2018, showcasing a speedrun of Amity Airfield, a scenario from RollerCoaster Tycoon 2, completing it in just under five minutes. In July, Vos released a video demonstrating a calculator created using roller coasters within RollerCoaster Tycoon 2. In December 2018, Vos demonstrated a ride which would take 12 real-life years to complete. In July 2019, he released a video demonstrating a ride that would take 45 real-life years to complete. In December 2019, Vos demonstrated a roller coaster that would take 135 years to complete.

In July 2020, Vos demonstrated a maze that exploits the path-finding algorithm in RollerCoaster Tycoon 2 and is nearly impossible for in-game guests to complete. After Vos released his video on YouTube, the developers of OpenRCT2 changed the algorithm.
