= Nijboer =

Nijboer may refer to:

- Ben Nijboer (1915–1999), Dutch theoretical physicist
- Erwin Nijboer (born 1964), Dutch cyclist
- Friso Nijboer, Dutch chess player
- Gerard Nijboer, Dutch long-distance runner
- Henk Nijboer, Dutch politician
- Ryan Nijboer, Dutch tennis player
