= Albert van der Haar =

Dutch footballer

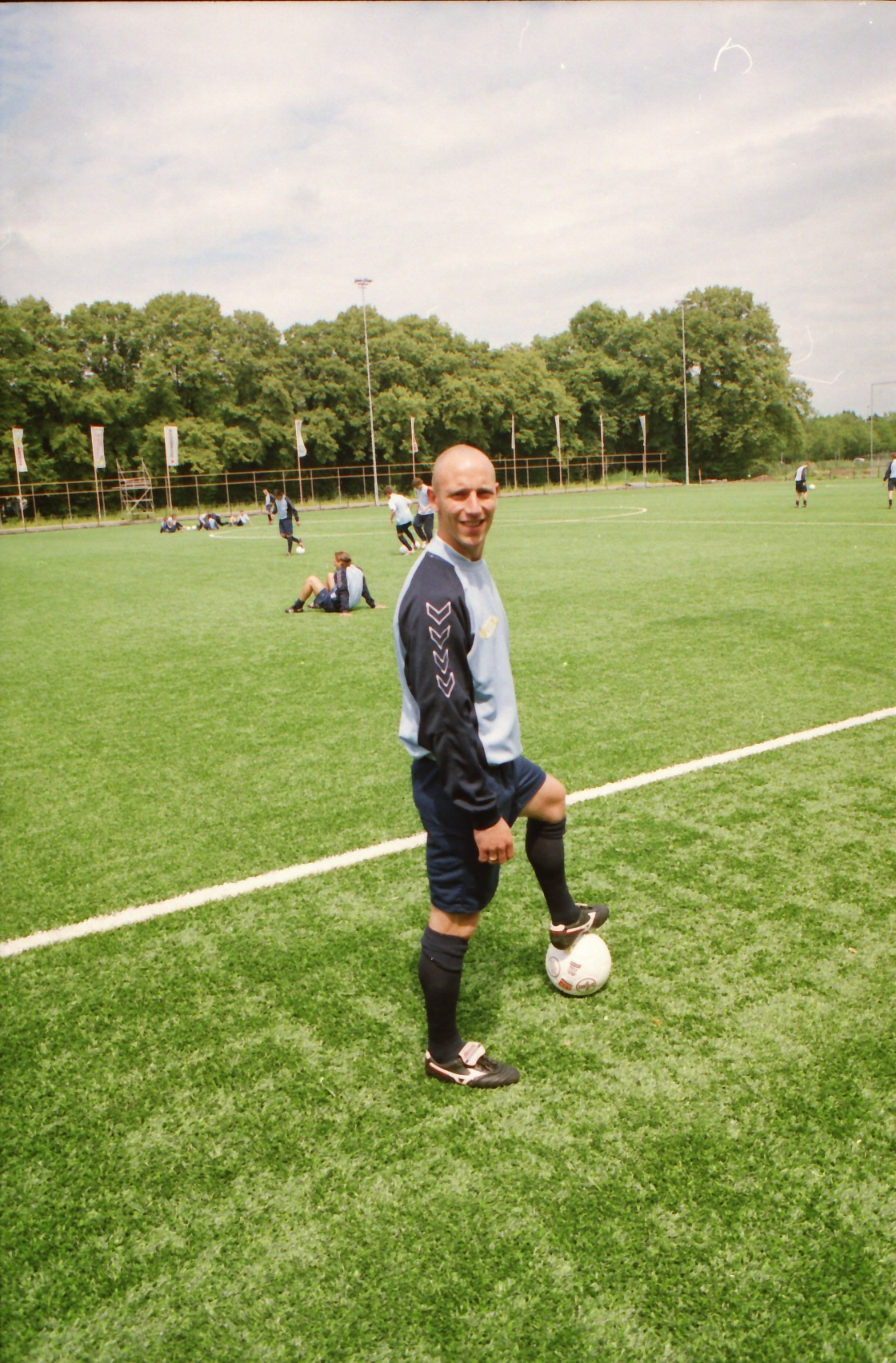

Personal information
- Full name: Albert van der Haar
- Date of birth: 29 December 1975 (age 50)
- Place of birth: Meppel, Drenthe, Netherlands
- Height: 1.74 m (5 ft 9 in)
- Positions: Defender; defensive midfielder

Senior career*
Years	Team	Apps	(Gls)
1994–2004	FC Zwolle	292	(13)
2004–2006	Willem II	51	(0)
2006–2011	FC Zwolle	162	(23)
2011–2012	Staphorst		
Total		505	(36)
- * Club domestic league appearances and goals as of 31 March 2014 (UTC)

Albert van der Haar (Dutch pronunciation: [ˈɑlbərt fɑn dər ˈɦaːr]; (Note: Van in isolation: [vɑn].) born 29 December 1975) is a Dutch retired footballer, who played for FC Zwolle most of his career.

In 2004 van der Haar moved to Willem II, only to return to Zwolle two years later.

== Personal life ==
After retiring as a player, van der Haar became a youth coach at Zwolle. Also, he and his wife Seline took over a poultry business.
