= Meppel =

- City and municipality
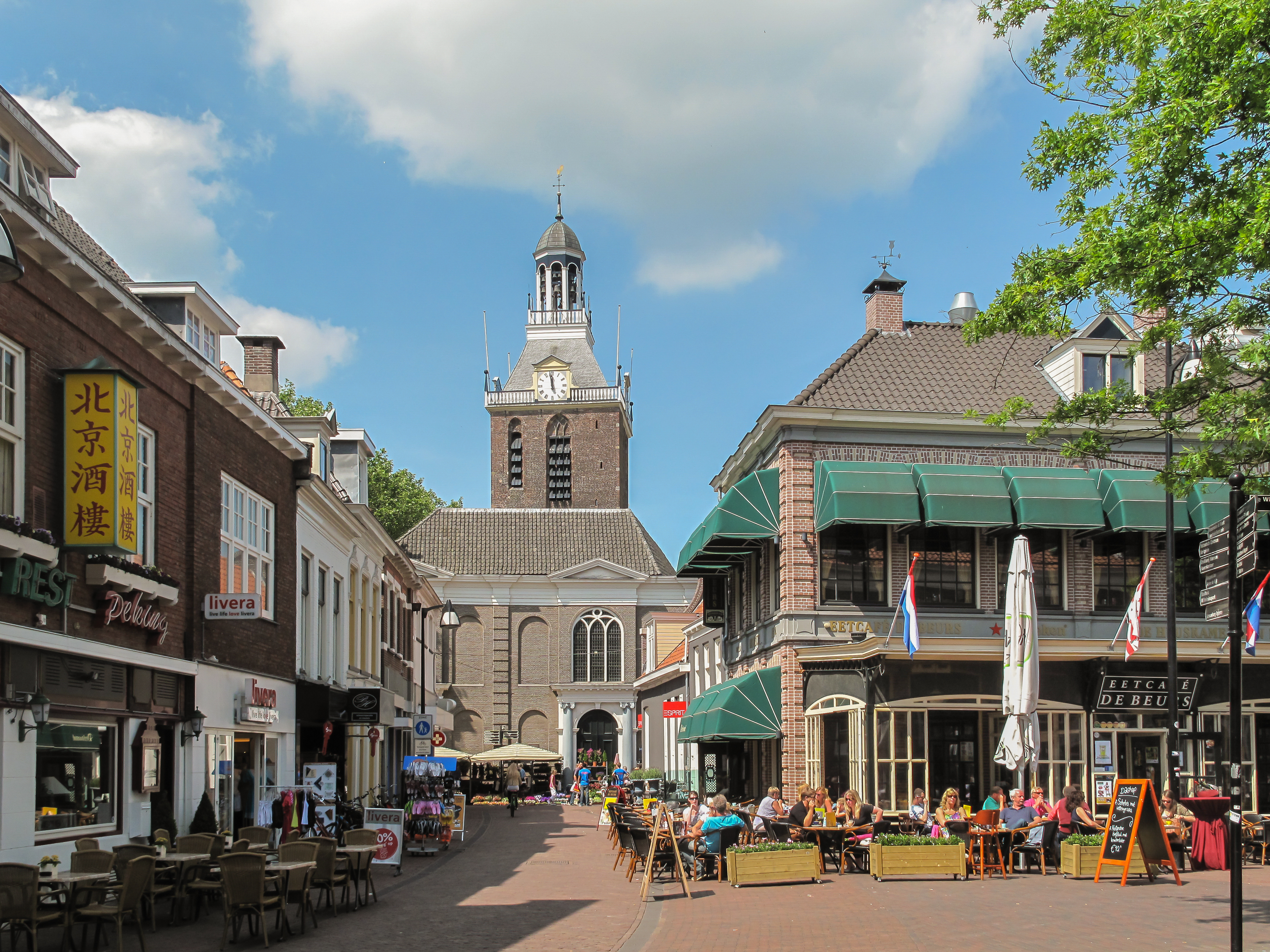
- Meppeler toren (Tower of Meppel)

- Flag Coat of arms

- Location in Drenthe
- Coordinates: 52°42′N 6°11′E
- Country: Netherlands
- Province: Drenthe

Government
  - Body: Municipal council
  - Mayor: Arjen Maathuis (VVD)

Area
  - Total: 57.03 km^{2} (22.02 sq mi)
  - Land: 55.53 km^{2} (21.44 sq mi)
  - Water: 1.50 km^{2} (0.58 sq mi)
- Elevation: 2 m (6.6 ft)

Population (January 2021)
  - Total: 34,386
  - Density: 619/km^{2} (1,600/sq mi)
- Demonym: Meppeler
- Time zone: UTC+1 (CET)
  - Summer (DST): UTC+2 (CEST)
- Postcode: 7940–7949, 7965–7969
- Area code: 0522
- Website: www.meppel.nl

Meppel (Dutch pronunciation: [ˈmɛpəl]; Drents: Möppelt) is a city and municipality in the Northeastern Netherlands. It constitutes the southwestern part of the province of Drenthe. Meppel is the smallest municipality in Drenthe, with a total area of about 57 km^{2} (22 sq mi). As of 1 July 2021, it had a population of 34,506 with over 30,000 inhabitants within city limits.

While it is a small city, it has a rich trading history. Agriculture and shipbuilding were important sources of income for Meppel. The market also played an important regional role. The city owes its regional tourist appeal to its accessibility via the canals for pleasure boats and its characteristic, densely built-up old town center with its squares.

People born in Meppel are occasionally referred to as Meppeler Muggen in Dutch; this translates as 'mosquitoes from Meppel'. The nickname comes from a traditional folk tale. The people of Meppel thought the church tower was on fire, but after closer inspection, they realised it was only a swarm of mosquitoes.

== History ==
Meppel flourished in the 16th century as an inland harbour for peat transport and distribution. It was an important transit port thanks to its connection to the Drentsche Hoofdvaart and Hoogeveense Vaart canals on one side and the Meppelerdiep canal on the other. The Zuiderzee could be reached via the Meppelerdiep canal at Zwartsluis. Peat was exported from all over Drenthe to the west of the country along this route. Now only one waterway remains in the town.

In the 17th and 18th centuries, many bargemen settled in the town, which had received city rights from the bailiff of Drenthe in 1644 and now had more than a thousand inhabitants. In 1809, Meppel was again granted city rights by Louis Napoleon. On 5 November 1815, Meppel received its own city regulations from King William I.

=== Canals ===
Partly because of the canal names Heerengracht, Keizersgracht, and Prinsengracht, the city is sometimes called the Mokum of the North (even if the name is more used for Winschoten). Meppel is also compared to Amsterdam for other reasons. For example, there were centuries of ties between the two cities, and the Jewish community was well represented in Meppel before the Second World War.

In the twentieth century, several canals that ran straight through the city center were filled in. Several drawbridges were also replaced by fixed bridges. Since then, it has become impossible to sail through Meppel into Drenthe, partly due to the narrowing of the Hoogeveense Vaart in 2005 near the Oosterboer.

On 1 October 1867, Meppel railway station opened to service, drastically improving connectivity in the region. On 1 January 1998, the municipality of Nijeveen, northwest of Meppel, was merged with that of Meppel, retaining the latter name.

=== 20th century ===
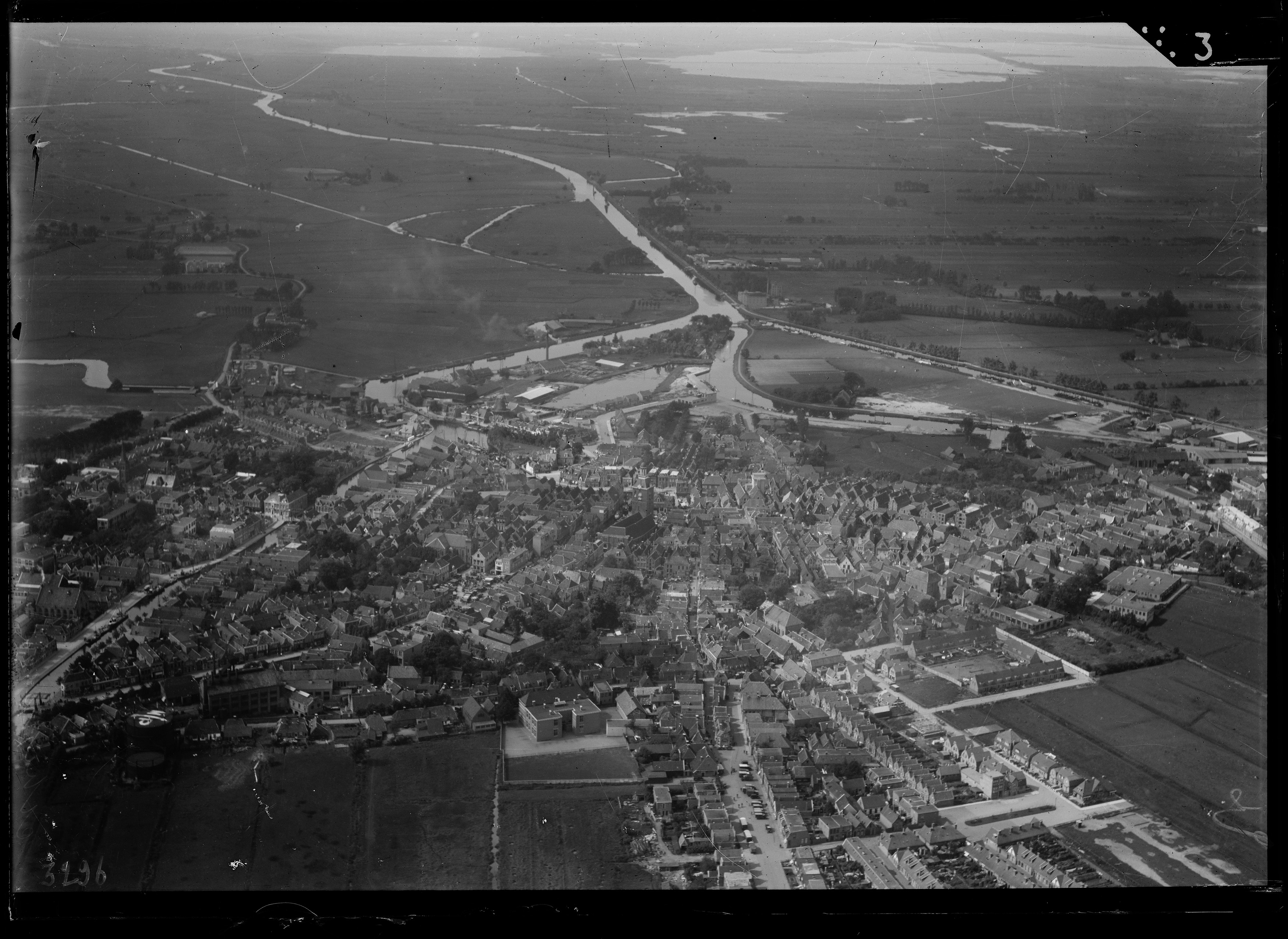
Aerial photograph of Meppel, 1920 - 1940

During World War II, almost all of Meppel's Jewish residents were transported to concentration camps by the German occupiers and lost their lives there. Of the 250 Meppel Jews, 232 perished, and only 18 returned.

== Geography ==
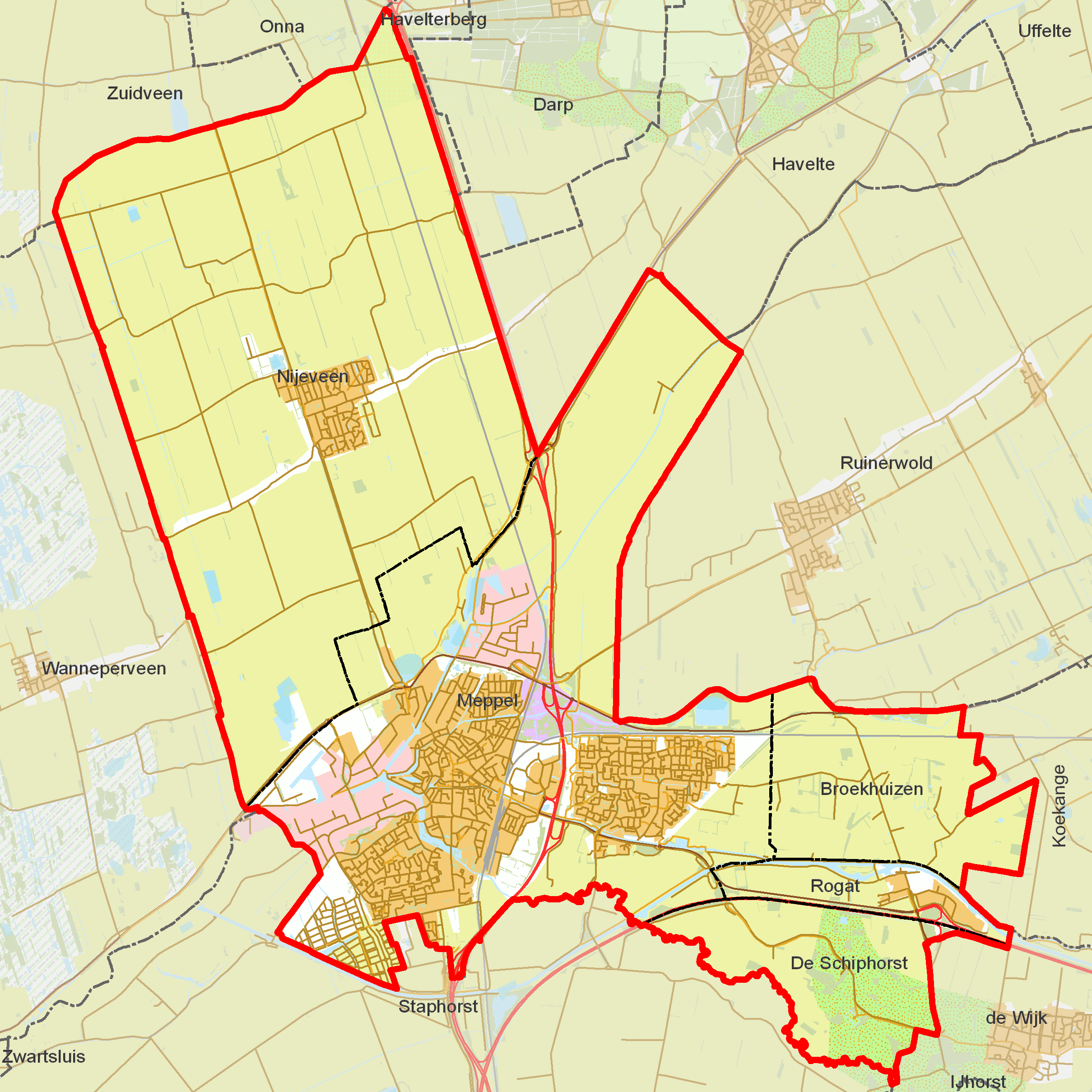
Map of Meppel municipality

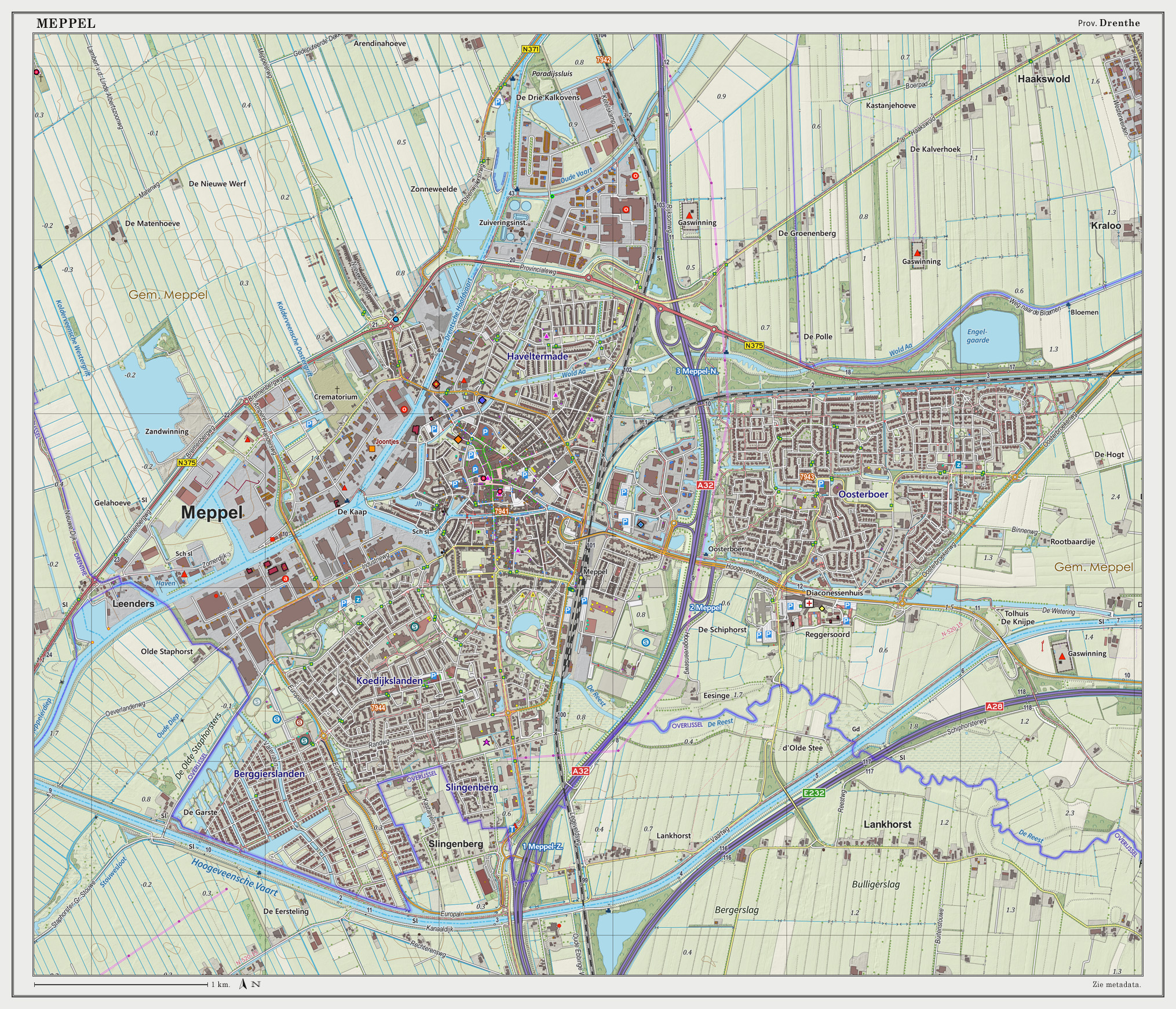
2014 topographic map of the city of Meppel

Meppel is located at 52°42′N 6°11′E in the southwestern part of the province of Drenthe in the northeastern part of the Netherlands.

The Meppelerdiep, the Drentsche Hoofdvaart and the Hoogeveense Vaart connect Meppel to Zwartsluis, Assen and Hoogeveen. To offload professional transport vessels the Omgelegde Hoogeveense Vaart was dug out south of the city. The Meppelerdiep is accessible for boats with a size of 2,000 ton.

The streams Reest and Wold Aa run through the city. The Reest end in the Meppeler Diep.

The population centres in the municipality are:

- Nijeveen
- Nijentap
- Havelterberg (part)
- Broekhuizen
- Rogat
- De Schiphorst

== Harbor ==
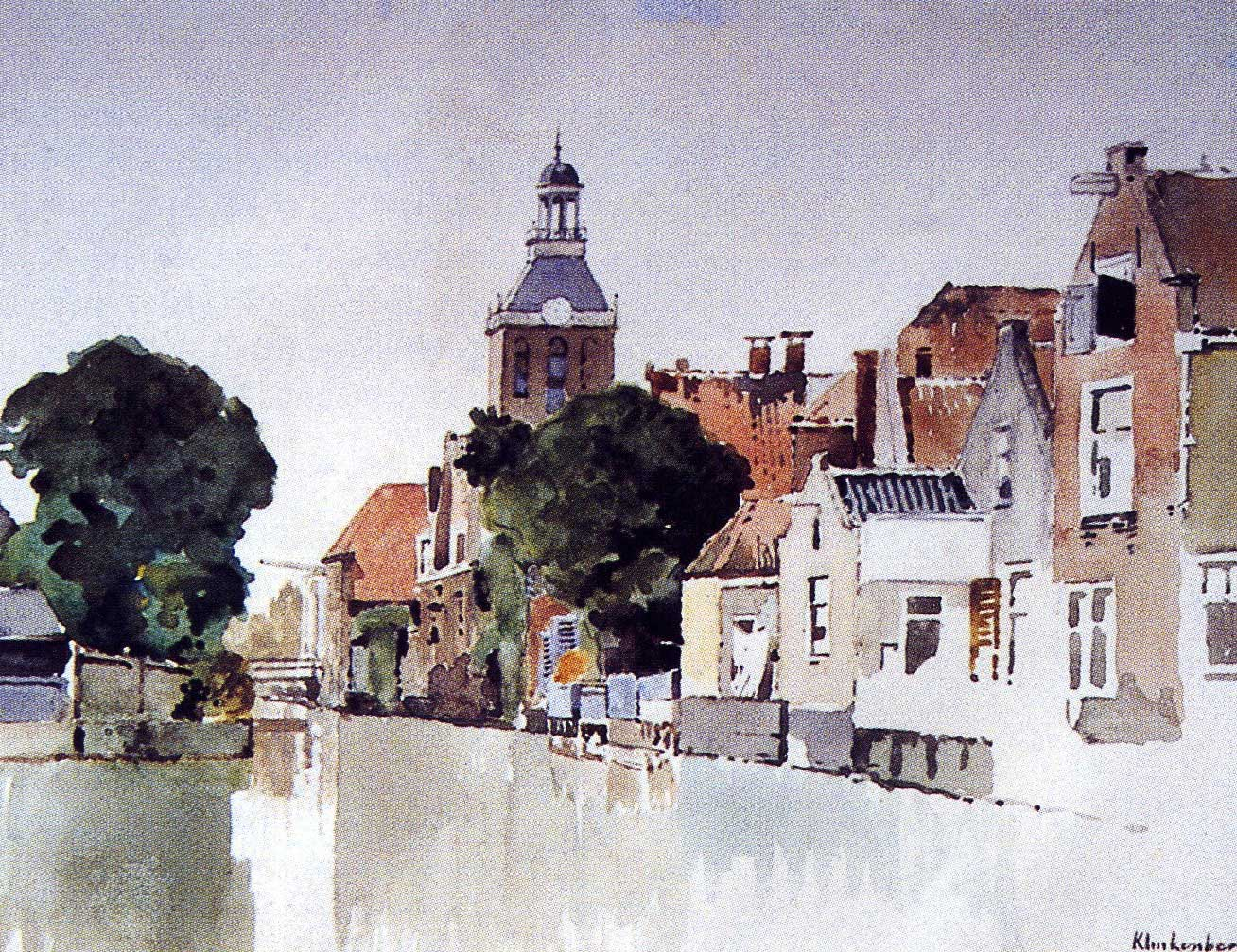
Meppel harbor art by Karel Klinkenberg

Meppel is accessible by water for vessels up to approximately 3,000 tons and is located on the main waterway network. Meppel is connected to Zwartsluis and subsequently the IJsselmeer via the Meppelerdiep canal. Meppel also provides access to the Drentsche Hoofdvaart canal. It has a relatively large and easily accessible inland harbor that serves a large region. The port of Meppel cooperates with those of Kampen and Zwolle.

There are several shipyards in Meppel, for both commercial and pleasure craft. There are also several loading and unloading companies with their own unloading docks.

== Transportation ==
Meppel is served by national and regional train connections with Zwolle to the southwest, which leads to the west and south of the country, as well as Leeuwarden and Groningen to the northwest and northeast respectively. The city's station is located on both the Arnhem–Leeuwarden railway (Staatslijn A) and Meppel–Groningen railway (Staatslijn C). Meppel station is a major hub for travelers from the north, including intercity trains to The Hague and Rotterdam. The station is the fourth-largest train station (after Groningen, Leeuwarden, and Assen) in the north, with an average of almost 6,500 passengers boarding and alighting per day (source: NS, 2018).

There are regular and frequent bus lines within Meppel and towards Zwolle, Hoogeveen and Assen.

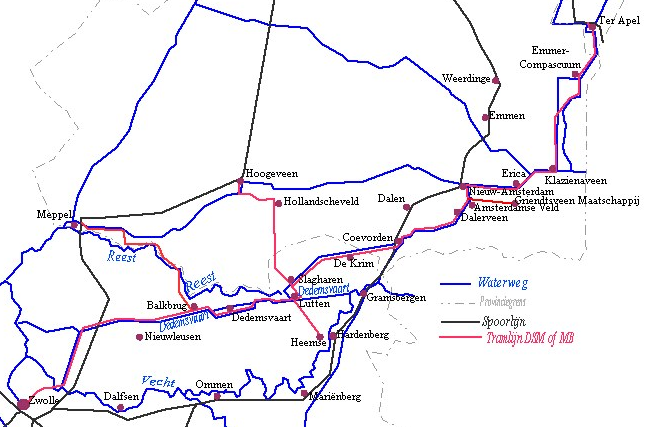
Map of the old DSM routes in red (Meppel is on the left)

In 1908, Meppel received a steam tram connection by the Dedemsvaartsche Stoomtramweg-Maatschappij (DSM) company. The line ran from Meppel to Balkbrug with a length of 22 km. The service closed in about 1939.

== Twin towns – sister cities ==
Meppel is twinned with:

- Most, Czech Republic
- Al Hoceima, Morocco

== Notable people ==
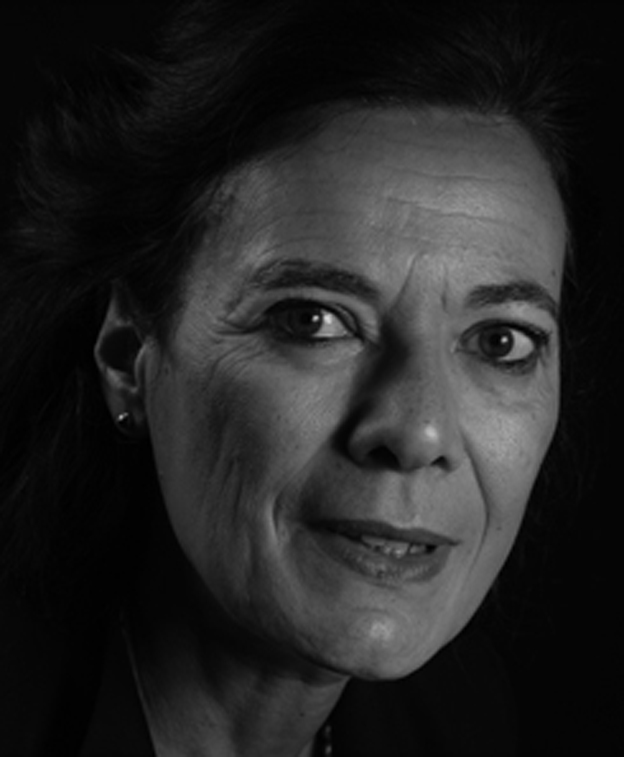
Louise Fresco

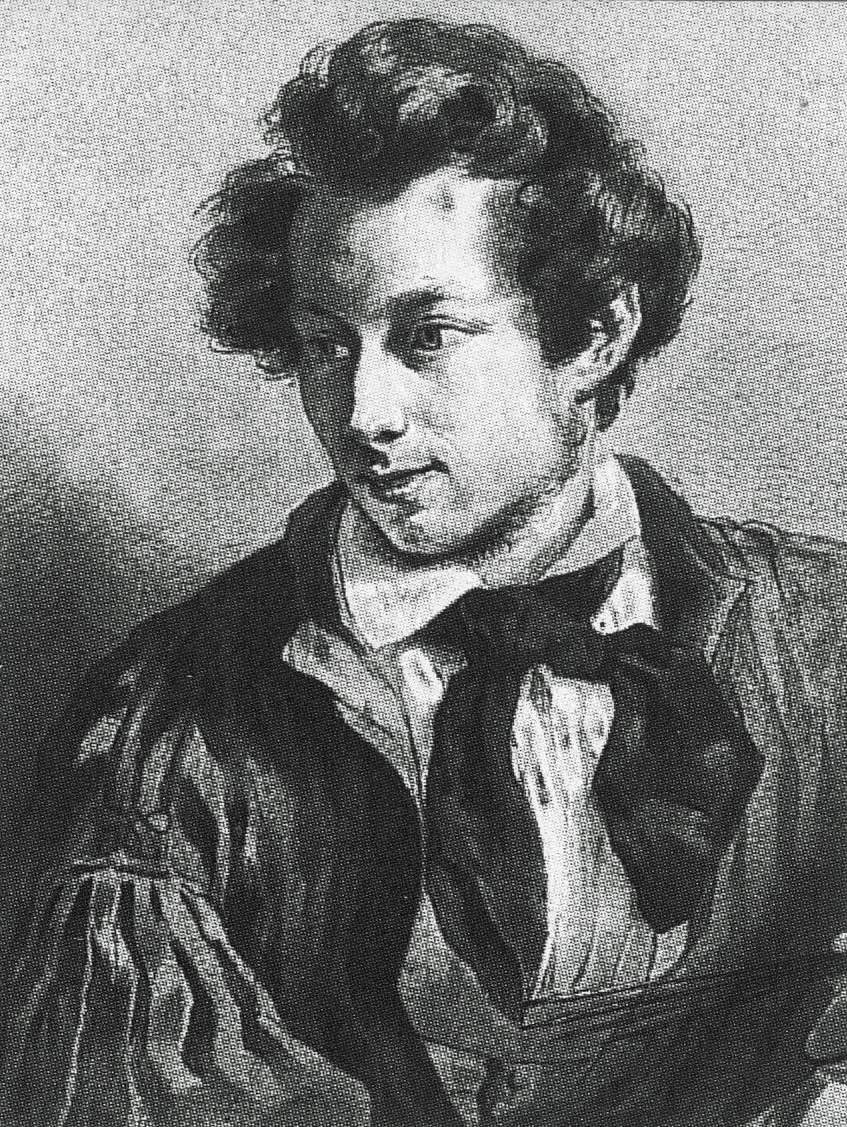
Petrus Kiers

- Jan Jansen Bleecker (1641–1732) a merchant and political figure, Mayor of Albany, New York
- Arent Magnin (1825–1888) a Dutch politician in the administration on the Dutch Gold Coast
- Petrus Johannes Waardenburg (1886 in Nijeveen – 1979) a Dutch ophthalmologist and geneticist; Waardenburg syndrome is named after him
- Ben Nijboer (1915–1999) a Dutch physicist and academic in optics and solid-state physics
- Jan Roelof Kruithof (1936–2026) an accomplished Dutch speed skater, grew up in Kolderveen
- Louise Fresco (born 1952) a Dutch scientist and writer on globally sustainable food production
- Catrien Santing (born 1958) a Dutch medievalist
- Erik Kwakkel (born 1970) a Dutch scholar who specialises in medieval manuscripts, paleography and codicology
- Albert van der Haar (born 1975) is a Dutch former footballer with almost 500 club caps

=== The arts ===
- Petrus Kiers (1807–1875) a Dutch painter, graphic artist and photographer
- Sir Joseph Joel Duveen (1843–1908) an art dealer and benefactor of art galleries.
- Henry J. Duveen (1854–1919) an art dealer
- Eduard Frankfort (1864–1920) a Dutch Jewish painter
- Jan Mankes (1889–1920) a Dutch painter, sometimes categorized as a symbolic realist
- Jelle Taeke de Boer (1908–1970) a Dutch art collector
- Roelof Frankot (1911–1984) a Dutch painter, a strong relation with the CoBrA movement
- Emmanuel Ohene Boafo (1993) a Dutch-Ghanaian actor, and winner of the Louis d'Or 2021
- Marcel Vos (born 1997) a Dutch YouTuber

== Gallery ==
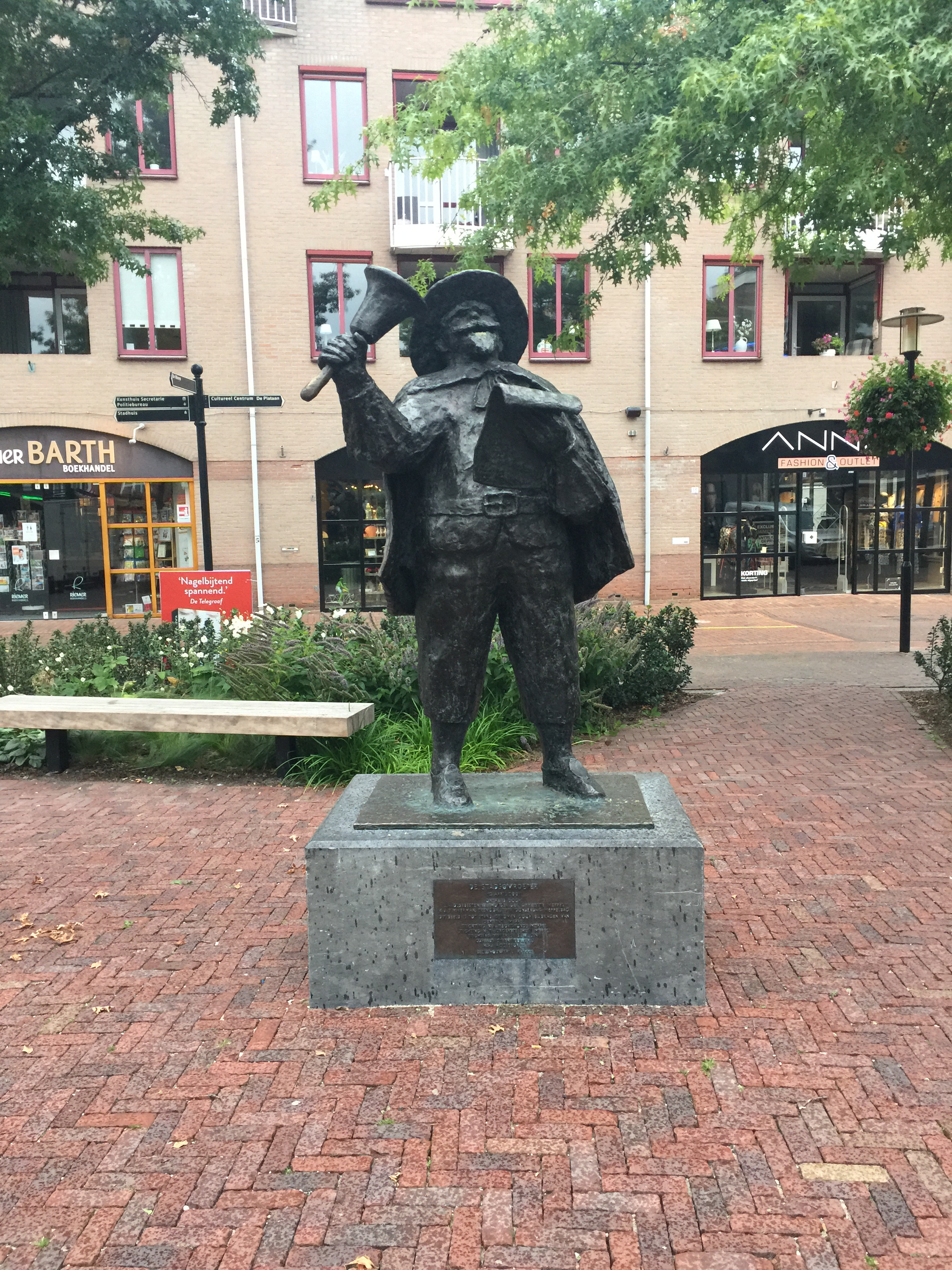
Statue in the city centre

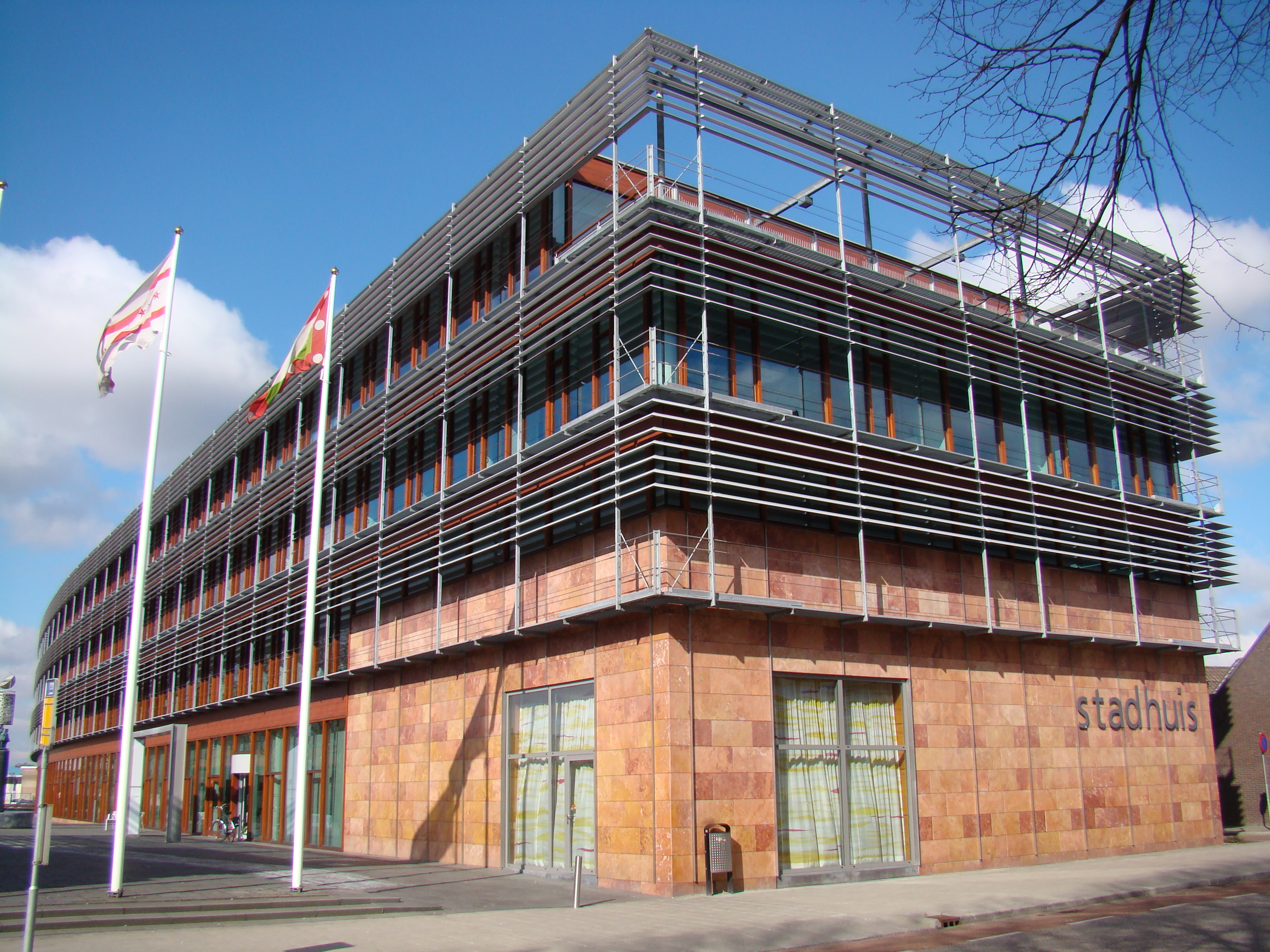
City hall

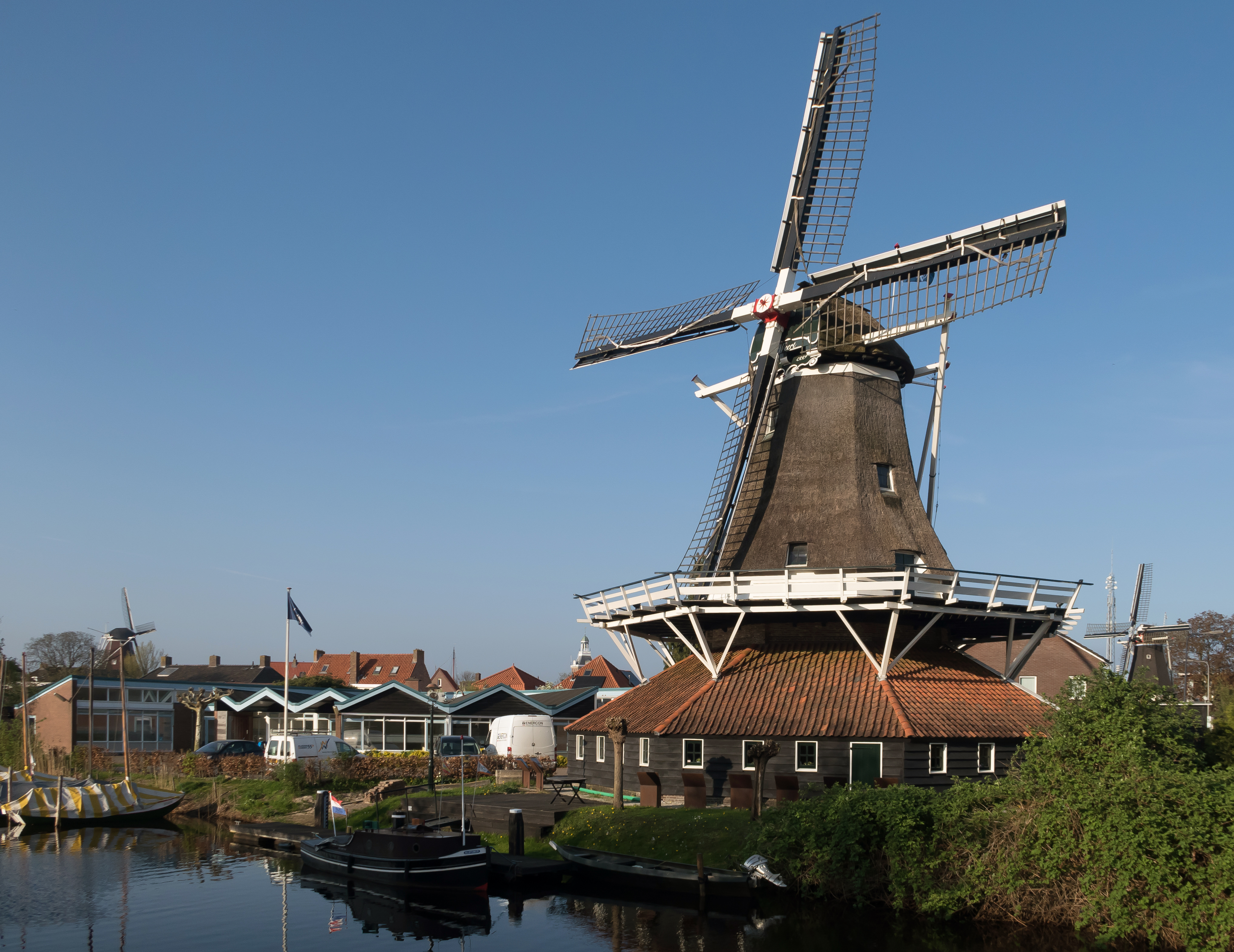
Windmill (de Weert)

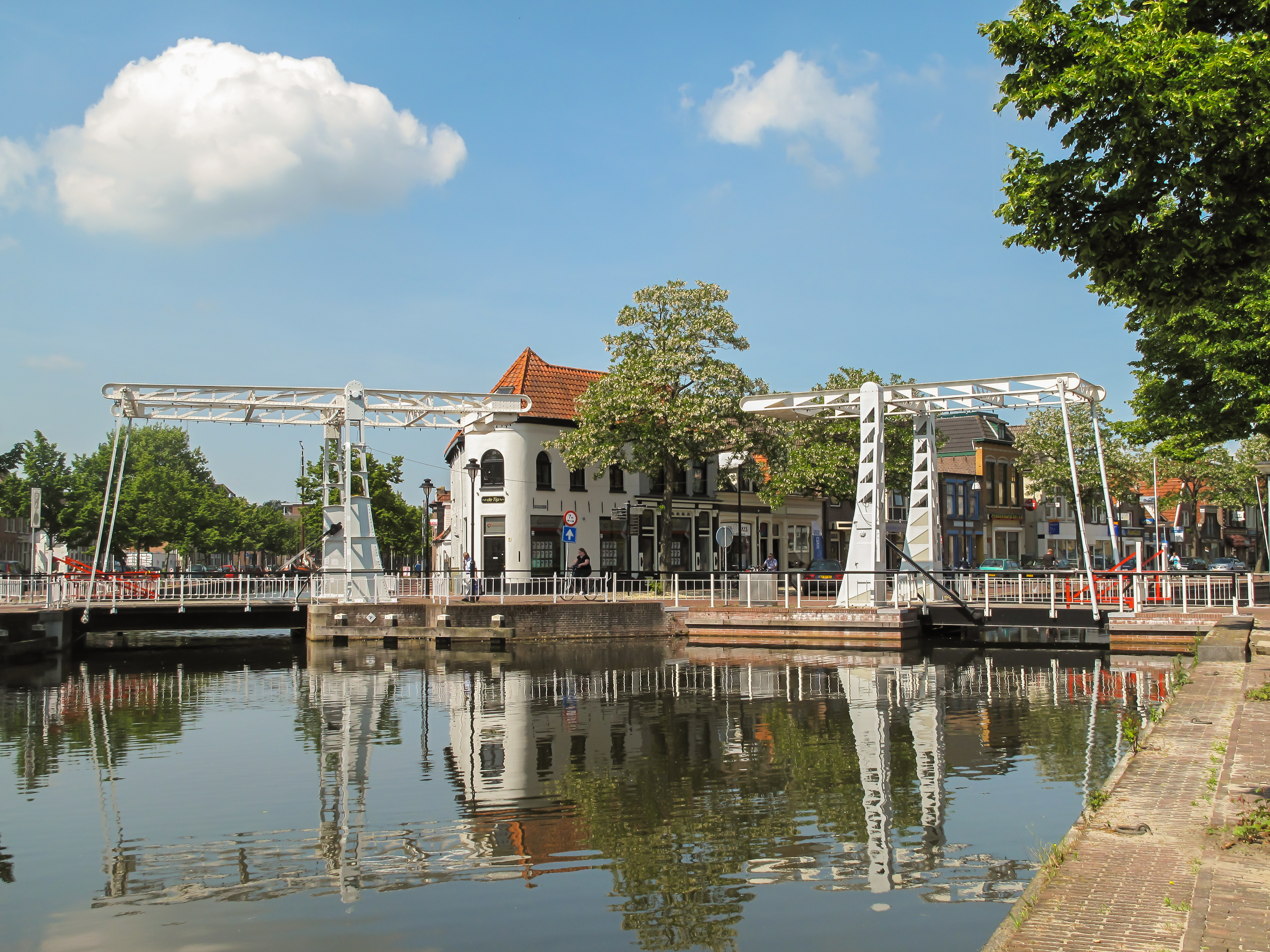
Two drawbridges

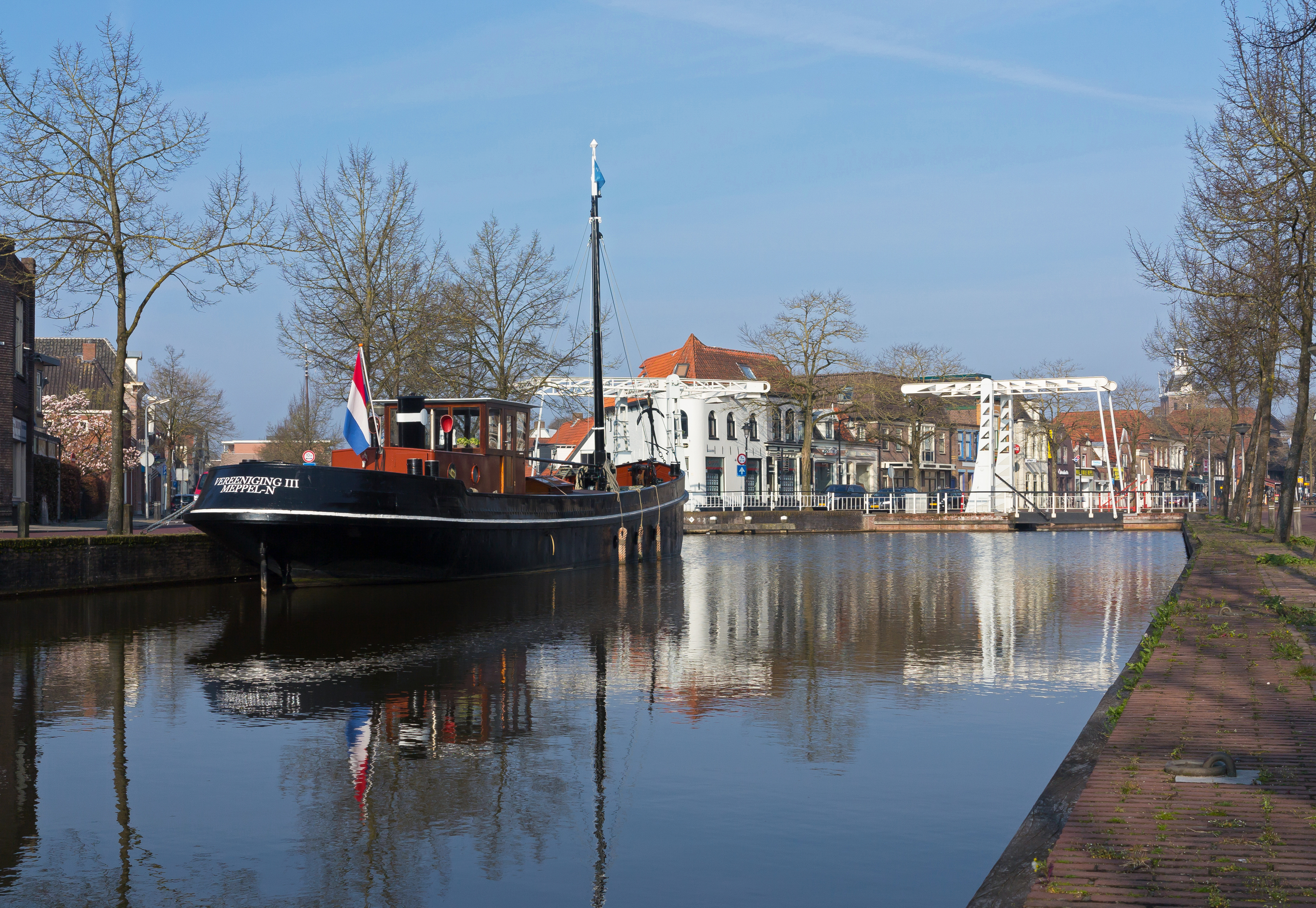
Ship de Vereeniging III

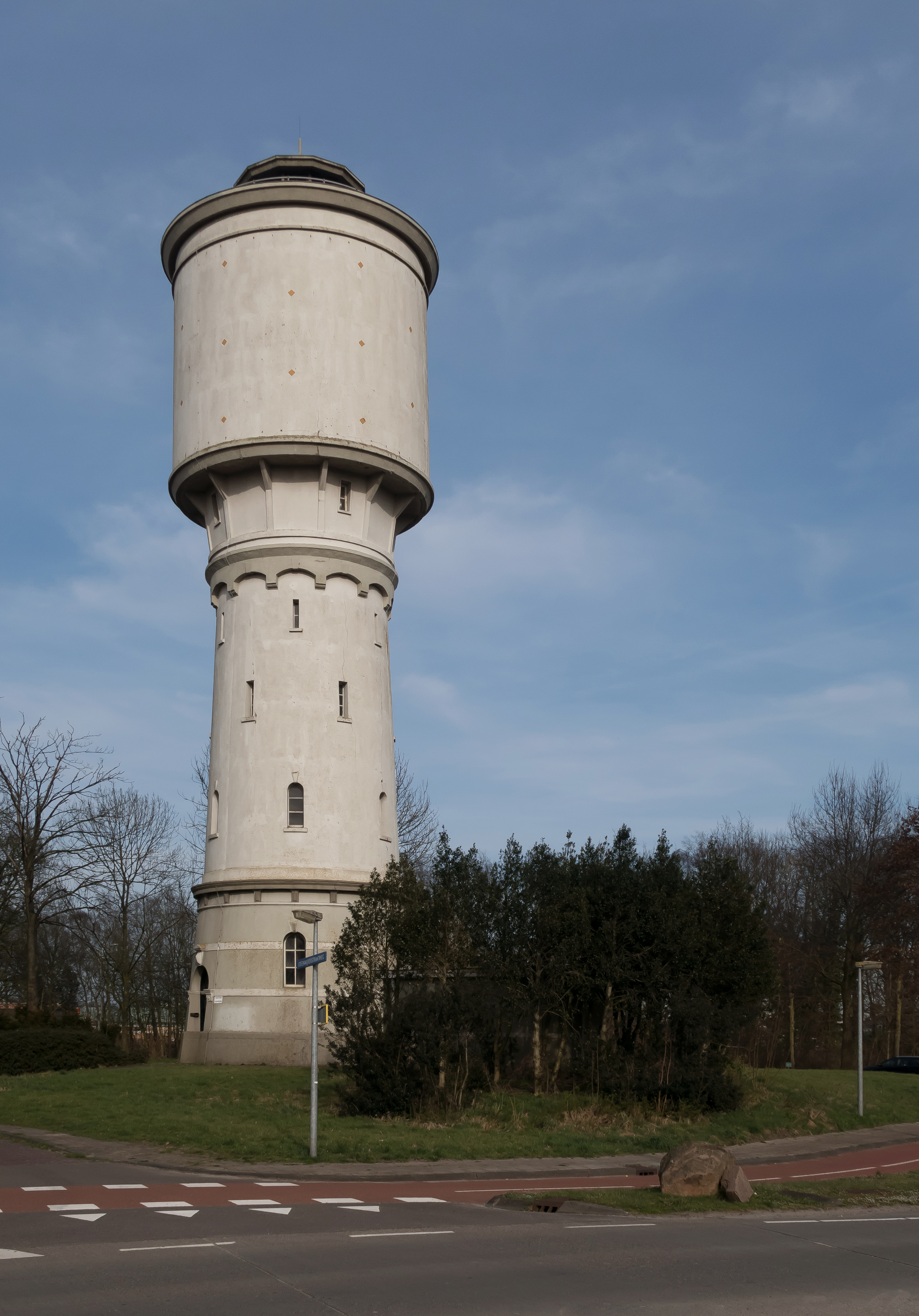
Watertower

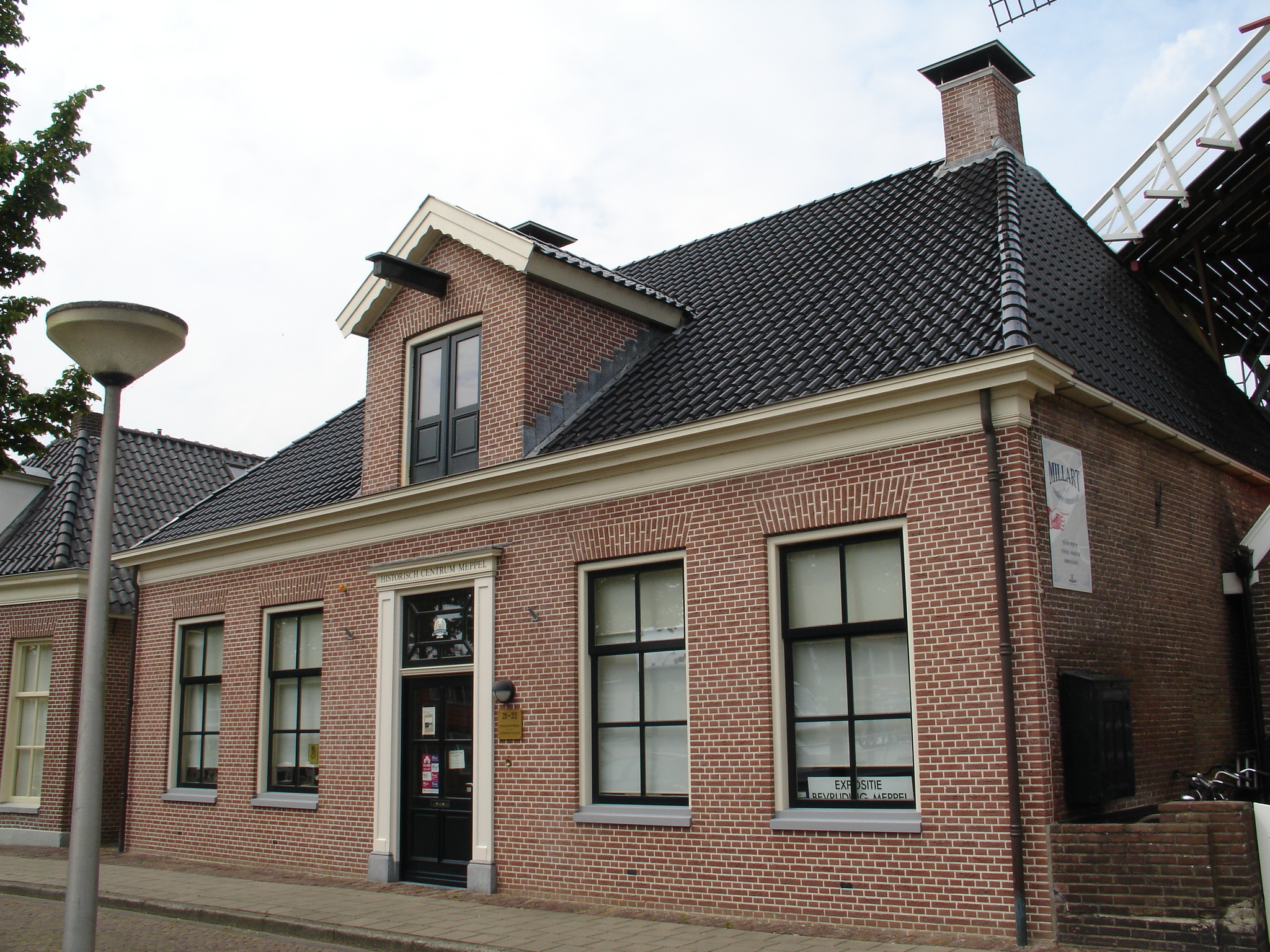
Historical centre of Meppel
