= Jelle Taeke de Boer =

Dutch art collector

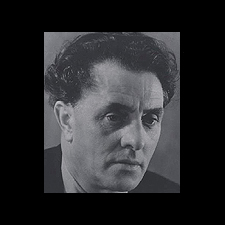
Jelle Taeke de Boer

Jelle Taeke de Boer (February 26, 1908 – October 7, 1970) was a Dutch art collector born in Meppel, Drenthe. He grew up in a poor family, with his mother dying when he was four years old, and his father an alcoholic.

During the depression of the 1930s, Jelle was having trouble raising a family, yet found motivation in Vincent van Gogh as a role model. He eventually became nearly obsessed with him, collecting literature and eventually anything attributed to him. His mission in life was to find the nearly 800 pieces that could be traced back to Van Gogh. He quickly became an expert on the subject of the painter.

== Authenticity ==
By 1960 Jelle de Boer accumulated nearly 400 works, 100 of which he attributed to Van Gogh. A close friend recommended that he open his gallery to the public. On June 11, 1966, he opened the doors to what he called the "Galerie d'Art" in Amsterdam. Visitors had to buy the catalogue, with illustrations of 57 exhibits.

From that exposition JD Fogarty, an American lawyer, bought four paintings which were proven to be authentic master pieces. “The Bacchanale” from Puvis de Chavannes, “Dans le Foret” from Monticelli, “L’Homme a Table” from Toulouse-Lautrec and finally the top piece, the “Infanta Margarita” from Manet. Mr. Fogarty has since spent 35 years to have these examined and authenticated as the priceless copy made by Édouard Manet. In December 2003, the international acknowledgement of the Infanta painting was again substantiated by an article in the Journal of the American Institute for Art Restoration and Preservation.

== Swiss confiscation ==
In July 1967, Jelle de Boer showed 200 of his best works in the Hofgalerie in Lucerne, Switzerland. The Swiss art establishment filed a complaint on suspicion of fraud. After several weeks of headlines and television reports, the police decided to confiscate the entire collection. Hofgalerie's owner Anton Achermann was arrested and put in jail – in solitary confinement. All works were removed in order to be destroyed as fakes. Jelle de Boer was never allowed to see his collection again and he died of a heart attack in 1970, 62 years of age. Anton Achermann's business and his name had been ruined by his confinement, and he decided to spend the rest of his life fighting against injustice. Achermann succeeded in releasing approximately 180 works. 21 works were to remain in the Palace of Justice till June 2002.
