= Louise Fresco =

Dutch scientist and writer

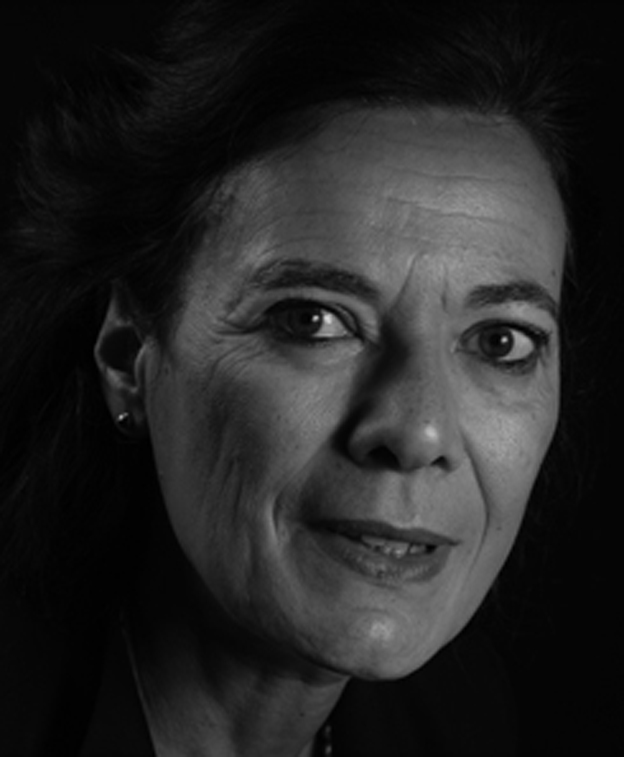
- Born: 11 February 1952 (age 74); Meppel, Netherlands
- Education: Wageningen University
- Website: LouiseOFresco.com

Louise Ottilie Fresco (born 11 February 1952) is a Dutch scientist and writer known for her work on globally sustainable food production.

== Career in academia ==
Fresco was President of the Wageningen University & Research Executive Board between 2014 and 2022. She is a professor at Wageningen University and a corresponding member of Belgium's Royal Academy of Overseas Sciences.

Fresco has also been a member of the Royal Netherlands Academy of Arts and Sciences (KNAW) since 2009, a foreign member of the French Academy of Agriculture, a non-resident member of the Royal Swedish Academy of Agriculture and Forestry in Stockholm, a corresponding member of the Real Academia de Ingeniería in Madrid, a member of the Royal Holland Society of Sciences and Humanities and a foreign member of the Royal Flemish Academy of Belgium for Science and the Arts, Class of Natural Sciences in Brussels. She is a Distinguished Visiting Scholar of the Academy of Science South Africa.

== Other activities ==
In May 2006, a British newspaper published Fresco's resignation letter as one of eight Assistant Directors-Generals of FAO. In her letter, Fresco stated that "the Organization has been unable to adapt to a new era", that its "contribution and reputation have declined steadily" and "its leadership has not proposed bold options to overcome this crisis".

Since April 2019 she has been an Independent Non-Executive Director of the Board of Directors of Syngenta, with special attention for scientific innovations for the purpose of healthy, sustainable food production. She is a member of the Trilateral Commission, member of the editorial board of the literary journal De Gids, a member of the Council of Advisors of the World Food Prize and a member of the Council of Advisors of the Amsterdam Symposium on the History of Food. She is also columnist at NRC Handelsblad and chair of the selection board of the Johannes van Dam Prize. She is also Board Member Foundation of the Dutch National Opera & Ballet Fund and member of the Ambassadors of the National Holocaust Museum (in development).

In 2020, Fresco was appointed by the World Health Organization's Regional Office for Europe to serve as a member of the Pan-European Commission on Health and Sustainable Development, chaired by Mario Monti.

== Bibliography ==
=== Novels ===
- Bambusa (1990)
- De kosmopolieten (2003)
- De tuin van de sultan van Rome (2005)
- De utopisten (2007)
- De Idealisten (2018)
- Hamburgers uit de moestuin(2019)
- De Plantenjager (2021)

=== Non-fiction ===
- Schaduwdenkers & lichtzoekers (1998) (Huizingalezing)
- Nieuwe spijswetten: over voedsel en verantwoordelijkheid (2006)
- Het einde van de universiteit (volgens een rapport van de Universiteit van Oeloemia) (2007) (diesrede UvA)
- Hamburgers in het paradijs : voedsel in tijden van schaarste en overvloed (2012)

=== Academic ===
- Cassava in shifting cultivation: a systems approach to agricultural technology development in Africa(1986) (thesis)
