= Rogat =

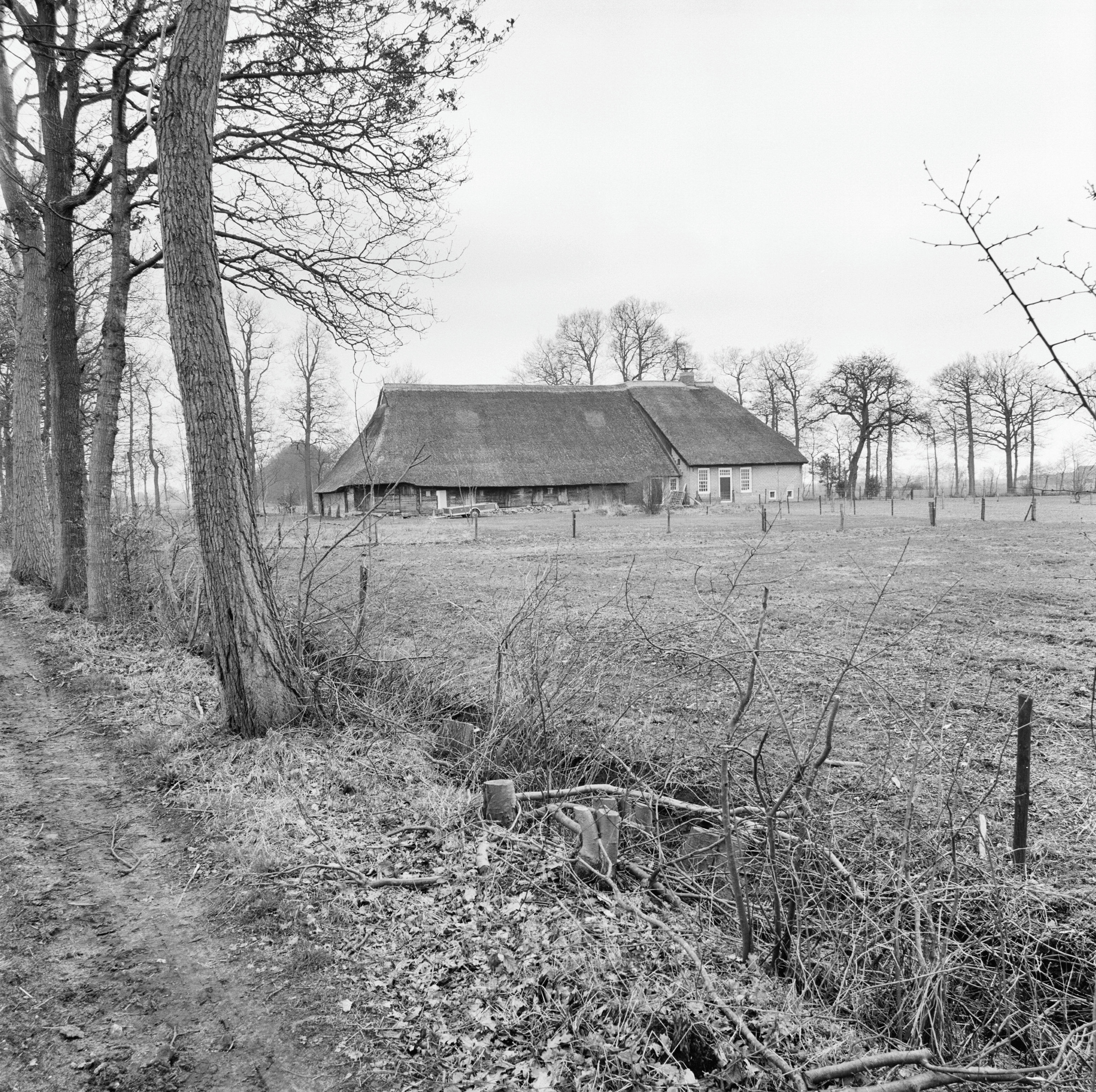
- Farm in Rogat

- Location of the village in the province of Drenthe Rogat (Netherlands)
- Coordinates: 52°41′15″N 6°16′0″E
- Country: Netherlands
- Province: Drenthe
- Municipality: Meppel

Area
  - Total: 1.54 km^{2} (0.59 sq mi)
- Elevation: 3 m (9.8 ft)

Population (2021)
  - Total: 120
  - Density: 78/km^{2} (200/sq mi)
- Time zone: UTC+1 (CET)
  - Summer (DST): UTC+2 (CEST)
- Postal code: 7949
- Dialing code: 0522

Rogat is a village in the Dutch province of Drenthe. It is a part of the municipality of Meppel, and lies about 5 km east of the city of Meppel.

It was first mentioned in 1725 as Rogatschut, and means "chimney". It has partially become an industrial area. The hamlet contains about 40 houses.
