= Roelof Frankot =

Dutch painter

- self portrait
- Born: 25 October 1911; Meppel, Netherlands
- Died: 1 December 1984 (aged 73); Raalte, Netherlands
- Known for: Painting

Roelof Frankot (25 October 1911, in Meppel – 1 December 1984, in Heeten) was a Dutch painter.

Frankot studied photography. In 1930, he started painting. He later had a strong relation with the CoBrA movement, and his artworks are quite similar to some of the art from the CoBrA movement. They are very abstract and spontaneous paintings in strong colours. Oil on canvas was his preferred medium. Publications with his art were occasionally accompanied by small poems that he wrote himself. Frankot has been considered an innovator of Dutch art with all its great traditions. Frankot died at the age of 73 from cancer.

Frankot's work was included in the 1939 exhibition and sale Onze Kunst van Heden (Our Art of Today) at the Rijksmuseum in Amsterdam.

During his career Frankot made a huge number of exhibitions in Europe, the United States and Latin America.

== Representations ==
Frankot is represented in private collections in many countries, especially in Britain, France and the Netherlands, and among others, the following institutions:

- Stedelijk Museum, Amsterdam, Netherlands
- Ministry of Education, Arts and Sciences, The Hague, Netherlands
- Sandberg Collection, Amsterdam
- Municipal Museum, Haag
- Britto Collection, Brazilia
- Dansk Arkitekt- & Ingeniørkontor, Silkeborg, Denmark
- Niepoort & Co., Aarhus, Denmark
- University of Aarhus, Denmark
- Drents Museum, Assen, the Netherlands
- Haags Gemeentemuseum, The Hague, the Netherlands

== As subject of published literature ==
- Scheen (1969); H. Redeker en M. van Beek, Van Cobra tot Zero (Venlo 1982)
- Frankot, Roelof/Roding, M. Roelof Frankot. Schilderijen en tekeningen 1911-1984
- Assen, Drents Museum, 1990, pap./softcover, 64 p. Dutch Roel H.Smit-Mulder, “Staphorst
- Roel H.Smit-Mulder, “Staphorst verbeeld. Toen en nu”, (Zwolle, 2000) 41
