= Ben Nijboer =

Dutch physicist and professor

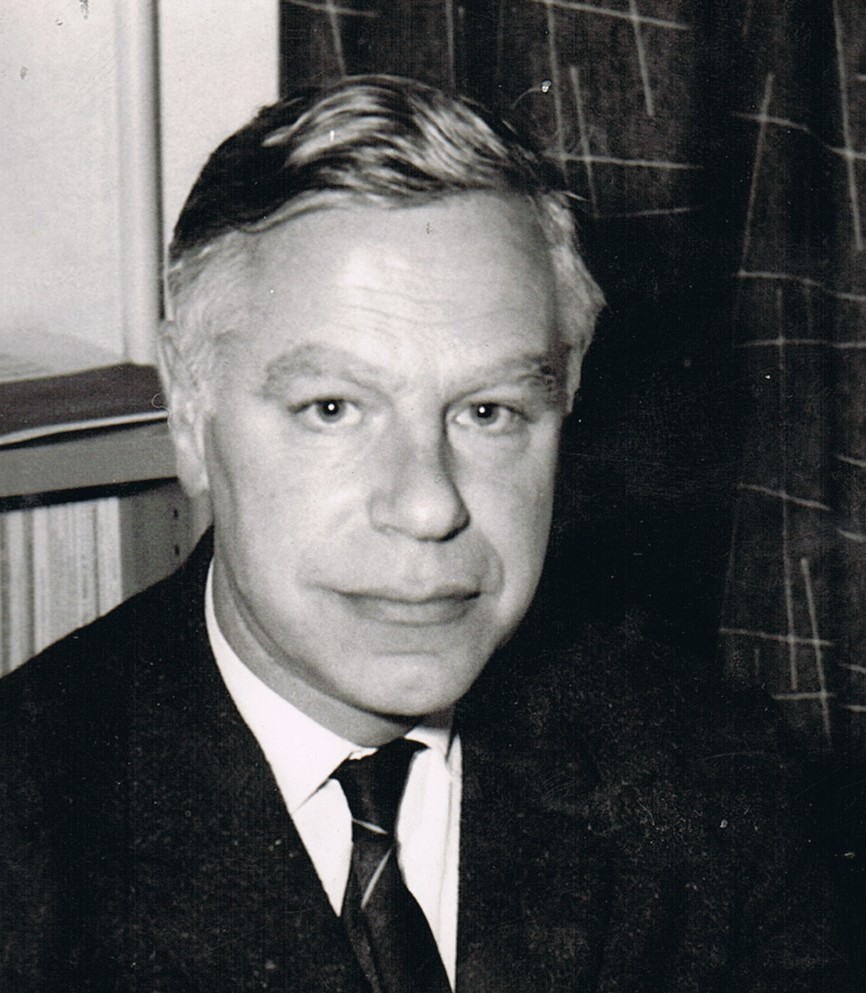
- Nijboer in 1969
- Born: 30 September 1915; Meppel
- Died: 25 January 1999 (aged 83); Utrecht
- Scientific career
- Fields: optics and solid-state physics

Bernard Roelof Andries Nijboer (30 September 1915 – 25 January 1999) was a Dutch physicist and professor at the Institute of Theoretical Physics of the Utrecht University from 1956 until 1984. He was mainly active in the fields of optics and solid-state physics.

== Biography ==
Ben Nijboer was born as the eldest son of Roelof Nijboer and Janna Klamer. He grew up in Groningen where he visited the Rijks H.B.S; one of his teachers in mathematics was professor Dr O. Bottema from Delft. In 1932 at the age of sixteen he enrolled as a student in mathematics and physics at the Groningen University and after his bachelor's degree he majored in theoretical physics. His teachers were the future Nobel laureate in PhysicsFrits Zernike, dr. H. C. Brinkman and dr. R. Kronig. He graduated with distinction in 1937. On August 16, 1941, he married in Vries Ali Wildeman (1913-2017). From their marriage three daughters were born.

== Work and research ==
After his graduation in 1937. Ben Nijboer spent a year in Bristol on a scholarship in the group of the future Nobel laureate Nevill Mott. He worked on a problem concerning semiconductors, by his own account "without much enthusiasm." He came in contact with Jewish physicists who had emigrated from Germany, amongst whom Herbert Fröhlich, Heinz London and Walter Heitler. He published his first article in 1937 (with C. J. Bouwkamp) in Physica: Bemerkungen über Feldstarkeabhängigkeit der dialektrischen Konstante und Kerneffekt . On return from England, he was drafted for military service, which was extended for an additional year as a consequence of the mobilisation. His conscription ended with the demobilisation in May 1940. His first paid job was being a teacher substitute in Groningen; he substituted for a teacher who was court-martialed to three months imprisonment for surrendering to the Germans before he shot his last bullet.

=== Doctoral research ===
In the summer of 1940, he was professor Zernike's assistant at the University of Groningen. In the context of his doctoral research, he explored a problem in theoretical optics: optical imaging in a microscope. The problem here is how to account for the effect of diffraction, combined with the geometric image defects due to the lens not being ideal. His teacher Zernike had developed a computational method for the case of spherical aberration and Nijboer managed to expand this for astigmatism and coma. The results are known as the Nijboer–Zernike theory. In 1942 he acquired his Ph.D. with his dissertation The diffraction theory of aberrations.

At the beginning of the 21st century, this theoretical work was revived as a consequence of advances in the chip lithography. In 2002, sixty years after Nijboers dissertation, his research was followed up with the Extended Nijboer Zernike (ENZ) Analysis & Aberration Retrieval by researchers at the Philips Research Laboratories in Eindhoven and the TU Delft.

=== Work in Princeton ===
A Fulbright scholarship enabled him in 1949 to work in Princeton, New Jersey (USA) at the Institute for Advanced Study for a year. He stayed there from September 1, 1949 to June 1, 1950 and met physicists like Albert Einstein, Robert Oppenheimer, John von Neumann, Abraham Pais, Rudolf Peierls and Freeman Dyson. He worked with George Placzek and Léon Van Hove on the theory of neutron diffraction. The nuclear reactors, due to their large-scale production of neutrons, offered a new possibility for the study of solids and liquids, from which more information could be derived than from the X-ray scattering. An X-ray is a snapshot of the position of the atoms, while neutron scattering gives information about their movements. The interpretation of this information required a theory, which was developed by Placzek, Van Hove and Nijboer. Since then, this is the basis of this entire field of research.

=== Professor in Utrecht ===
In 1950 he was appointed by the University of Utrecht as a lecturer, with the teaching assignment of physics for chemistry students. In 1955 he studied for 6 months at the Niels Bohr Institute in Copenhagen. On May 27, 1955 he was appointed as professor of theoretical physics at Utrecht. His inaugural address was titled: Electrons and nucleons, the building blocks of matter . His closest colleagues were Léon Van Hove and Nico van Kampen. In 1961, Van Hove left for CERN in Geneva and Ben Nijboer became his successor as professor-administrator of the Institute for Theoretical Physics. In 1964-1965 he worked for a year at the 'Argonne National Laboratory' in Chicago (USA). Together with his PhD students Ben Nijboer studied several subjects: various aspects of the construction of Crystal with F. W. De Wette and J.J.J. Kokkedee, the theory of Van der Waals equation with MJ Renne and K. Schram. On August 1, 1984 he retired from the university at the age of 68. Between 1937 and 1988 he published 54 scientific articles. In 1988 he published his last (with Th Ruygrok) in the Journal of Statistical Physics, titled On the energy per particle in three- and four-dimensional Wigner lattices.

== See also ==
- Frits Zernike
- Józef Rotblat
