= OpenRCT2 =

2014 re-implementation of a 2002 video game

- Logo
- Developer: OpenRCT2 Team
- Release: 7 December 2014; 11 years ago
- Stable release: 0.5.5 / 6 September 2026; 13 days ago
- Written in: C, C++
- Operating system: Microsoft Windows, Linux, macOS, OpenBSD, Android
- Platform: x86, x64, ARM
- Available in: 20 languages
- Type: Construction and management simulation
- License: GNU GPLv3
- Website: openrct2.io
- Repository: https://github.com/OpenRCT2/OpenRCT2/

OpenRCT2 is a construction and management simulation video game that simulates amusement park management. It is a free and open-source re-implementation and expansion of the 2002 video game RollerCoaster Tycoon 2. In order to create an accurate clone of RollerCoaster Tycoon 2, the game was incrementally written in the platform-independent C++ programming language. In addition to various gameplay changes, the developers fixed a number of bugs and issues that were in the original game.

== Gameplay ==
As a re-implementation, OpenRCT2 requires a copy of the original game or the "Classic" re-release to already be installed on the computer. The gameplay of OpenRCT2 is, by nature of the project, very similar to the original RollerCoaster Tycoon 2 game upon which it is based. However, the re-implementation features a number of changes:

- Fast-forward mode
- Multiplayer support
- Support for high-definition resolutions
- Support for higher framerates
- Support for content from the original RollerCoaster Tycoon, such as scenarios
- Increased previous software limits on parks, such as scenery availability
- Options to exceed or tweak restrictions such as height clearance
- Optional early victory conditions, should goals be met before time runs out
- Improvements to pathfinding AI
- Cheats

== Development ==
Development of the game was started on April 2, 2014, by Ted "IntelOrca" John, and was continued by 250 other contributors.

In 2019, the game was brought to custom firmware Nintendo Switch systems by modder rsn8887 as a homebrew game, including touchscreen support.

A major update in 2022 allowed the game to use RollerCoaster Tycoon Classic (an official port of the original games) as a base install path.

Main theme by Allister Brimble

In May 2023, Allister Brimble, the theme composer for the first two RollerCoaster Tycoon games, announced he had composed a new theme song for OpenRCT2. Commissioned by the YouTuber Deurklink, the song was paid for by his Patreon subscribers in what he described as a community-funded effort. The theme was added to the game in a September 2023 update, which also added new backgrounds selected through a contest to the main menu. The same update also allowed for camera and UI frame rates to be unlocked from the previous 40 Hz limit.

== Reception ==
PC Gamer praised the increased scope for creativity with the new toolset, adding: "you can build the park of your dreams with coasters that no sane person who values their intestines would think about riding. It's a great way to return to such a wonderful classic PC game." Vice noted that OpenRCT2 "allows players much greater freedom in what they are able to build." Kotaku pointed out that OpenRCT2 allows RollerCoaster Tycoon 2 to run on modern systems "just fine", and features multiplayer support, weakening the incentive to purchase the later released RollerCoaster Tycoon Classic.

In 2020, Nerdist suggested OpenRCT2 among other stress-relieving games to play during the COVID-19 pandemic.

== See also ==
- OpenTTD
- List of open-source video games
