= List of major Creative Commons–licensed works =

Number of Creative Commons licensed works as of 2017, per State of the Commons report

This is a list of notable works available under a Creative Commons license. There are multiple Creative Commons licenses, each with important differences.

== Number of Creative Commons works ==
An analysis in November 2014 revealed that the amount of CC-licensed works in major databases and searchable via Google sums up to 882 million works. Nine million webpages link to one of the CC licenses.

Platform name	Number of works (rounded down by millions, November 2014)	Source
Flickr	307 million	
Wikipedia (all pages in all languages)	111 million	http://meta.wikimedia.org/wiki/List_of_Wikipedias
MusicBrainz	39 million	https://musicbrainz.org/statistics https://musicbrainz.org/doc/About/Data_License
Freebase	39 million	https://developers.google.com/freebase/faq#how_big_is_freebase
DeviantArt	15 million	https://creativecommons.org/weblog/entry/35540
GeoNames	10 million	http://www.geonames.org/about.html
YouTube	10 million	https://support.google.com/youtube/answer/2797468
Google Search	301 million	google-currenttools.csv, google-retiredtools.csv

Creative Commons offers also a search engine for major databases as: Europeana, Open Clip Art Library, Pixabay, ccMixter and more.

== Governments and intergovernmental organizations ==
As of January 2016, 31 governments and 7 intergovernmental organizations have made their information available per CC according to creativecommons.org; similarly dozens of organizations from the GLAM sector (Galleries, Libraries, Archives, and Museums).

== Conditions of distribution ==
Below is a list of conditions ("rights") of a work's distribution. All Creative Commons licenses grant "baseline rights", such as the right to distribute the copyrighted work worldwide for non-commercial purposes and without modification.

Icon	Right	Description
Circled person pictogram	Attribution (BY)	Licensees may copy, distribute, display, perform and make derivative works and remixes based on it only if they give the author or licensor the credits (attribution) in the manner specified by these. Since version 2.0, all Creative Commons licenses require attribution to the creator and include the BY element. The letters BY are not an abbreviation, unlike the other rights.
Circled arrow pointing counterclockwise into itself	Share-alike (SA)	Licensees may distribute derivative works only under a license identical to ("not more restrictive than") the license that governs the original work. (See also Copyleft.) Without share-alike, derivative works might be sublicensed with compatible but more restrictive license clauses, e.g. CC BY to CC BY-NC.
Circled dollar sign struck through by diagonal line	Non-commercial (NC)	Licensees may copy, distribute, display, perform the work and make derivative works and remixes based on it only for non-commercial purposes.
Circled equals sign	No derivative works (ND)	Licensees may copy, distribute, display and perform only verbatim copies of the work, not derivative works and remixes based on it. Since version 4.0, derivative works are allowed but must not be shared.

== Books ==
Name	Original release	CC Release	Description	License	Refs
The Art of Unix Programming	2003	2005	book about the history and culture of Unix programming by Eric S. Raymond (with added proviso)	CC BY-ND 1.0	
A Briefer History of Time	1999	2004	science humor book by Eric Schulman	CC BY-NC-ND 1.0	
Archimedes Palimpsest	3rd century BC	2008	reconstructed and released by OPenn as Free Cultural Works	CC BY	
Free Culture	2004		by Lawrence Lessig (the first CC licensed book released by a major mainstream publisher, Penguin Books)	CC BY-NC 1.0	
Freesouls	2008	2010 (digital ebook)	book with essays and photos of key people of the free movement by Joi Ito	CC BY	
The Future of Ideas	2001	2001	by Lawrence Lessig (originally published by Random House)	CC BY-NC	
The Future of the Internet and How to Stop It	2008		book by Jonathan Zittrain which discusses several legal issues regarding the Internet	CC BY-NC-SA 3.0	
The Honour of the Knights	2009	2009	A science fiction novel by Stephen J Sweeney	CC BY-NC-SA	
Meat Atlas	2014	2014	A collection of graphs and 27 essays on meat consumption and production by Friends of the Earth and Heinrich Böll Foundation	CC BY-SA	
Move Under Ground	2004		A horror novel mashup by Nick Mamatas	CC BY-NC-ND	
Warbreaker	2004	2004	by Brandon Sanderson	CC BY-NC-ND	
Little Brother	2008	2008	by Cory Doctorow	CC BY-NC-SA 3.0	
Open Access	2012	2012	by Peter Suber (published by MIT Press)	CC BY	
Blindsight	2006		by Peter Watts	CC BY-NC-SA 2.5	
Code: Version 2.0	2006		by Lawrence Lessig, dedicated to Wikipedia	CC BY-SA 2.5	
Remix: Making Art and Commerce Thrive in the Hybrid Economy	2008		by Lawrence Lessig in describing the remix culture	CC BY-NC	
The Wealth of Networks	2006	2006	by Yochai Benkler	CC BY-NC-SA	
Stranger Things Happen	2001	2005	short horror stories by Kelly Link, Salon Book of the Year	CC BY-NC-SA	
There Is No Antimemetics Division	2025	2016	by qntm, originally released on the SCP Wiki and as a self-published ebook and paperback under this license before being rewritten and published by Ballantine and Del Ray.	CC BY-SA 3.0	

== Comics ==
Name	Description	License	Refs
Bunny	by Huw Davies	CC BY-NC-SA 3.0	
Diesel Sweeties	by Richard Stevens III	CC BY-NC 2.5	
Erfworld		CC BY-NC-SA 3.0	
Gaia	by Oliver Knörzer and Puri Andini	CC BY-NC-ND 3.0	
Homem-Grilo	by Cadu Simões (pt)	CC BY-SA-4.0	
Jesus and Mo	religious satire webcomic by Mohammed Jones	CC BY-NC-SA 3.0	
Johnny Wander	(the book publication form)	CC BY-NC 3.0	
Mimi & Eunice	by Nina Paley	CC BY-SA 3.0	
Overcompensating		CC BY-NC 3.0	
Pepper&Carrot	by David Revoy	CC BY 4.0	
Sandra and Woo	by Oliver Knörzer and Puri Andini	CC BY-NC-ND 3.0	
Seedfeeder's works for Wikipedia	by Seedfeeder	CC BY-SA 3.0, public domain	
xkcd	by Randall Munroe	CC BY-NC 2.5	

== Educational resources ==
Name	Description	License	Refs
Connexions	academic course modules, hosted by Rice University	CC BY-NC-SA (Note: All content published since 22 April 2026. Prior content was variably published under CC BY and CC BY-NC-SA.)	
Khan Academy		CC BY-NC-SA	
OpenLearn	Short articles, videos and extracts of courses maintained by The Open University	CC BY-NC-SA	
OpenCourseWare		CC BY-NC-SA	
Saylor Academy	Peer-reviewed college courses and textbooks	CC BY	
WikiEducator		CC BY-SA (default), CC BY, and CC0	
Project Euler	Site hosting computer programming problems	CC BY-NC-SA	

== Games ==
Name	Description	License	Refs
Cards Against Humanity	An adult party game using custom-printed cards	CC BY-NC-SA	
Dungeons & Dragons System Reference Document 5.1 & 5.2	The core rules of a popular fantasy role-playing game	CC BY 4.0	
Eclipse Phase	A transhuman science fiction role-playing game	CC BY-NC-SA 4.0	
Tagmar	The first Brazilian fantasy role-playing game fully developed in Brazil	CC BY-NC-SA 3.0 BR	
Violence	A heavily satirical role-playing game inspired by excessive violence in other role-playing games and video games	CC BY-NC-SA 2.5	
Secret Hitler	A social deduction party game set in the Weimar Republic	CC BY-NC-SA 4.0	

== Video games ==
Name	Description	License	Refs
Cataclysm: Dark Days Ahead	ASCII graphic rogue like	CC BY-SA (artwork and code)	
DOGWALK	A game created as a proof of concept for a workflow pipeline between Blender and Godot.	CC BY	
Glest / MegaGlest	A real-time strategy computer game in a fantasy setup.	CC BY-SA (artwork)	
Glitch	An MMO. In 2013, most of the artwork and parts of the code were released under a Creative Commons license.	CC0	
Mari0	Super Mario clone mashup with Portal	CC BY-NC-SA	
OpenClonk (formerly Clonk)	A computer game originally developed by RedWolf Design, later opened to the community.	CC BY/CC BY-NC (artwork)	
Ryzom	Ryzom is a free and open source software PC MMORPG. Originally developed and released 2004 by Nevrax, since 2010 the source code is under the AGPL and the artistic work is under CC BY-SA.	CC BY-SA (artwork)	
Sintel The Game	A game based on the Blender Foundation movie, Sintel.	CC BY	
The Adventures of Fatman	point and click adventure game	CC-BY-NC-ND	
Tyrian (now OpenTyrian)	Scrolling shooter	CC BY 3.0 US (graphic assets)	
The Ur-Quan Masters (formerly Star Control II)	Action RPG	CC BY-NC-SA (artwork)	
Yo Frankie!	A game resulting from a cooperation between the Blender Foundation and the Crystal Space community	CC BY 3.0	

== Images and photos ==
Name	Description	License	Refs
deviantART	image artwork sharing website	various (15 million CC-licensed)	
Flickr	user photo uploading and sharing service	various (350 million out of 6+ billion images were CC-licensed as of 2011)	
Mapillary	Over 30 million free photos	CC BY-SA	
Metropolitan Museum of Art	paintings and artworks	CC0 (375,000)	
Mushroom Observer	collaborative amateur mycology database with approx. 600,000 observational photos	CC BY-SA or CC BY-NC-SA	
Open Game Art	Media repository for software / game projects	CC BY, CC BY-SA, CC0, others	
Panoramio	Over 100 million photos	Various	
Pixar One Thirty	130 textures created for Pixar films	CC BY	
Smithsonian	Objects in the public domain and portions of metadata for all object entries	CC0	
Fortepan	archival photographs, and family snapshots of everyday life	CC BY-SA (100.000 images)	
Unsplash	user photo uploading and sharing service	CC0 prior to 5 June 2017	
Wikimedia Commons	free image and data repository, stores Wikipedia images	various free CC licenses (40+ million images in 2018)	

== Music ==
Name	Description	License	Refs
The Slip	By Nine Inch Nails	CC BY-NC-SA	
Ghosts I–IV	By Nine Inch Nails	CC BY-NC-SA	
Palm Mall	By Cat System Corp.	CC BY 3.0	
Polygondwanaland	by King Gizzard & the Lizard Wizard	CC BY-ND	
Airports for Music	By SheedyJaye	CC BY 3.0	
ccMixter	Community music website	mostly CC BY-NC	
Free Music Archive		Various	
Freesound		CC0, CC BY, CC BY-NC and Sampling Plus	
#hot111 Charts	By starfrosch	CC BY CC BY-SA	
Jamendo		Various	
Ninjam	Music files/archive	CC BY-SA	
Pulse of the Earth	By Hungry Lucy	CC BY-SA	
Jonathan Coulton	Jonathon Coulton's works	CC BY-NC 3.0	
Paul and Storm	Paul and Storm's works	CC BY-NC-SA 2.5	
Open Goldberg Variations		CC0	
Cloudkicker	By Ben Sharp	CC BY-NC-SA 3.0	
Lud and Schlatts Musical Emporium	A project by YouTubers jschlatt and Ludwig to provide royalty-free music to creators.	CC BY 3.0	
Castle Crashers soundtrack		CC BY-NC-SA	

== News ==
Name	Description	License	Refs
Al Jazeera's broadcasting footage	On January 13, 2009, some broadcasting content from Al Jazeera on the 2008–2009 Israel–Gaza conflict was released.	CC BY 3.0	
Dagsavisen	Released after one year delay	Creative Commons Non-Commercial (CC BY-NC)	
Agência Pública	Online investigative journalism outlet with texts in Portuguese, English and Spanish.	CC BY-ND 4.0	
Corbeau News Centrafrique	French-language news site from the Central African Republic	CC BY-SA 4.0	
Democracy Now!	Internationally syndicated radio and TV news program. All transcripts from broadcasts are republished online and released under a Creative Commons license.	CC BY-NC-ND 4.0	
The Conversation	Online news outlet written by academics and researchers. Localised editions exist for Australia, Africa, Canada, France, Indonesia, the UK and the US.	CC BY-ND 4.0	
Deshabhimani	Malayalam language newspaper	CC BY 4.0	
Global Voices	International journalism organisation publishing in over 40 languages.	CC BY 3.0	
The Haitian Times	Online newspaper for the Haitian diaspora in the United States.	CC BY-ND 4.0	
La Stampa	3rd biggest newspaper of Italy.	CC BY-NC-ND 3.0	
openDemocracy	International online news website. Specific articles are released under a Creative Commons license.	CC BY-NC 4.0	
ProPublica	US news website.	CC BY-NC-ND 3.0 US	
States Newsroom	Network of 39 newsrooms reporting on U.S. state politics.	CC BY-NC-ND 4.0	
Tasnim News Agency	Iranian news agency publishing in Persian, English, Arabic, Turkish and Urdu.	CC BY 4.0	
TorrentFreak	News blog. Text licensed under a Creative Commons license.	CC BY-NC 3.0	
WikiTribune	News website with crowdsourced fact-checking, proofreading and editing. Published in English and Spanish.	CC BY 4.0	

== Knowledge, research and science ==
Name	Description	License	Refs
Copernicus Publications		CC BY	
Citizendium	a wiki encyclopedia	CC BY-SA	
Cliodynamics	Research	CC BY 4.0	
Knol	Website for personal essays. Went offline on May 1, 2012, but was archived on the Internet Archive	mostly CC BY-SA or CC BY-NC-SA	
PLOS One		CC BY	

== Databases and data ==
Name	Description	License	Refs
OpenSeaMap		CC SA-BY 2.0 / ODbL	
OpenStreetMap	Until September 2012; switched to ODbL	CC BY-SA 2.0 for certain content	
SNPedia	Database of single nucleotide polymorphisms	CC BY-NC-SA	

== Technology, blueprints and recipes ==
Name	Description	License	Refs
Arduino		CC BY-SA	
DragonBox Pyra	pre-release schematics released in November 2016	CC BY-NC-SA	
Free Beer	In December 2004 brewing recipe, brand and label artwork released under CC by Superflex and students of the IT University of Copenhagen	CC BY-SA	
Openmoko Neo Freerunner	CAD, schematics etc. files in 2008	CC BY-SA 3.0	

== Video and film ==
Name	Year	Description	License	Refs
Big Buck Bunny	2008	Product of the second Blender Foundation Open Movie Project, released in 2008.	CC BY	
Code Rush	2008	2000 documentary of Netscape's last year as an independent company, focusing on the rush to make Mozilla's source code ready for its release deadline.	CC BY-NC-SA 3.0 US	
Dominion	2018	Australian documentary film filmed primarily with drones and hidden cameras inside Australian slaughterhouses and macro-farms with the aim to educate the public on an opaque and cruel system.	CC BY	
The Yes Men Fix the World	2009	English language documentary film about the culture jamming exploits of The Yes Men.	CC BY-NC-ND	
Decay	2012	Zombie film made at CERN	CC BY-NC	
Elephants Dream	2006	Product of the first Blender Foundation Open Movie Project, released in 2006	CC BY	
Working Slowly (Radio Alice)	2004	2004 Italian drama directed by Guido Chiesa.	CC BY-NC-SA	
"Life Wasted"	2006	by Pearl Jam in 2006, first music video from a major record label to be CC licensed	CC BY-NC-ND 2.5	
Nasty Old People	2009	A 2009 film in Swedish by Hanna Sköld	CC BY-NC-SA	
Paywall: The Business of Scholarship	2018	American documentary film documenting the high profits and business practices of the academic publishing industry and the efforts of the open access movement to reform it.	CC BY	
RiP!: A Remix Manifesto	2008	a 2008 open-source documentary film about "the changing concept of copyright" and the remix culture directed by Brett Gaylor	CC BY-NC-SA 3.0	
Sita Sings the Blues	2008	feature-length animated film by free culture activist Nina Paley	CC BY-SA, later CC0	
Sanctuary	2005	A re-mixable Science fiction film	CC BY-NC-SA 2.5	
Sintel	2010	Product of the third Blender Foundation Open Movie Project, released in 2010	CC BY	
Spring	2019	Product of the twelfth Blender Foundation Open Movie Project, released in 2019	CC BY	
Star Wreck	1992-2012	Amateur movie parodies of Star Trek and Babylon 5 (in Finnish)	CC BY-NC-ND	
The Switch	2016	Canadian six-episode sitcom television series, originally broadcast by OUTtv in 2016.	CC BY-NC-ND 4.0	
Tears of Steel	2012	The fourth Blender Foundation Open Movie Project, released in September 2012.	CC BY	
Where are the Joneses?	2007	online sitcom (series)	CC BY-SA	

== Websites ==
Name	Description	License	Alexa Rankings	Refs
Anatomography		CC BY-SA		
Association for Progressive Communications		CC BY-SA		
Bangladesh Fisheries Information Share Home		CC BY-NC-ND		
Boing Boing	Popular blog	CC BY-NC-SA 3.0 (most)		
Devopedia	An open community platform for developers by developers to explain technology in a simple, clear and unopinionated way.	CC BY-SA 4.0 (non-code content)		
Fandom	Since June 2009	CC BY-SA		
Identi.ca		CC BY		
Internet Archive		Various	170	
gnu.org		Creative Commons Attribution-NoDerivatives 4.0 International License		
Mozilla website	Home of the Mozilla Project	CC BY-SA	166	
RationalWiki		CC BY-SA		
SCP Foundation	The SCP Wiki is a collaborative urban fantasy writing website about the fictional SCP Foundation, a secretive organization that contains anomalous or supernatural items and entities away from the eyes of the public.	CC BY-SA		
Stack Overflow		CC BY-SA	57	
The Public Domain Review	Online journal showcasing public domain works.	CC BY-SA (unquoted text in collection posts and articles only)		
Uncyclopedia	Satirical online encyclopedia.	CC BY-NC-SA		
Wikimedia projects including Wikipedia	Since June 2009; over 80 million items	Text CC BY-SA (plus GFDL in most cases); some in CC BY and CC-0; hosted content also in public domain and various licenses.		
Wikitravel		CC BY-SA		
