= CopyCamp =

International CopyCamp Conference
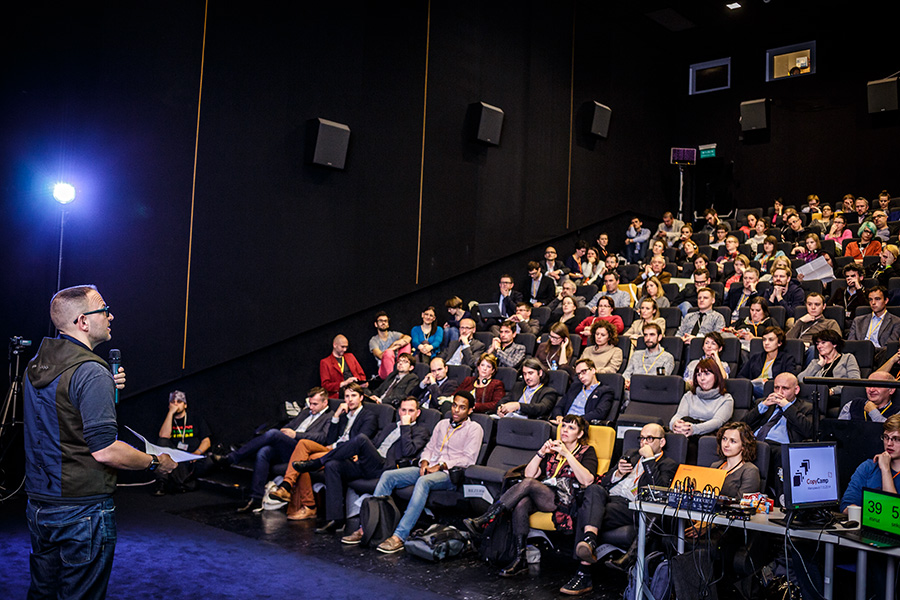
- Cory Doctorow presentation at CopyCamp 2014 in Warsaw
- Native name: CopyCamp
- Cause: Copyright, Free culture
- Organised by: Modern Poland Foundation
- Website: http://copycamp.pl

CopyCamp is an international conference devoted to copyright, organized in Warsaw by the Modern Poland Foundation. Representatives of cultural institutions, the media, creative sectors, academic, legal, political and non-governmental circles gather annually to discuss the influence of copyright on the circulation of cultural goods and social changes taking place all over the world.

== Partners and organizational background ==
Strategic partners are Trust for Civil Society in Central and Eastern Europe, Google, Samsung Electronics and Stowarzyszenie Autorów ZAiKS. Among other partners supporting the first three editions of the conference were: Coalition for Open Education, Kronenberg Foundation, Copyright for Creativity and National Audiovisual Institute. Every year, the event is organized under the honorary patronage of the Ministry of Administration and Digitization and academically supported by Interdisciplinary Centre for Mathematical and Computational Modelling. The third edition of CopyCamp was co-financed by the International Visegrad Fund.

== Editions ==
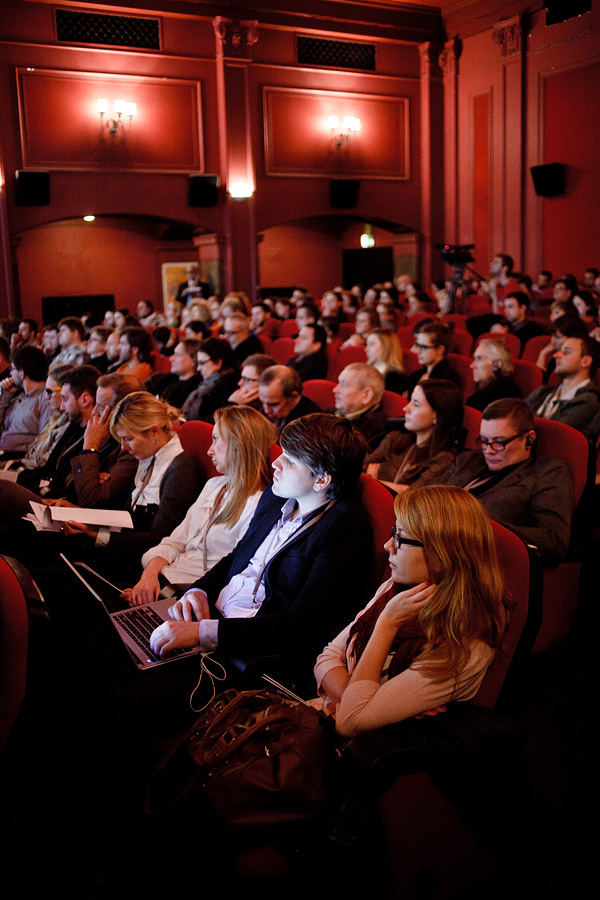
CopyCamp 2013

The speakers of the first edition organized in 2012 in kino Kultura were Nina Paley, Jan Błeszyński, Lidia Geringer de Oedenberg, Michał Kwiatkowski, Jarosław Lipszyc, Alek Tarkowski, Elżbieta Traple, Hieronim Wrona and Paweł Zalewski, among others.

In 2013 the conference took place on October 1 in kino Muranów with Eben Moglen as a special guest. Other speakers were Edwin Bendyk, Barbara Fatyga and Wojciech Orliński, among others.

CopyCamp 2014 took place on November 6–7 in kino Praha with two keynote speakers: Cory Doctorow and Birgitta Jónsdóttir next to such figures as Michał Boni, Lucie Guibault, Novika, Yngve Slettholm, Piotr Waglowski, Attila Szervác and Michał Wiśniewski, among others. At the third edition of CopyCamp, special attention was paid to the perspective of the Visegrád Group countries.

== Works ==
All artistic and scientific materials, logos, photographs, audio and video recordings are under CC BY-SA or compatible licences.
