= Wikimedia Polska =

- Stowarzyszenie Wikimedia Polska

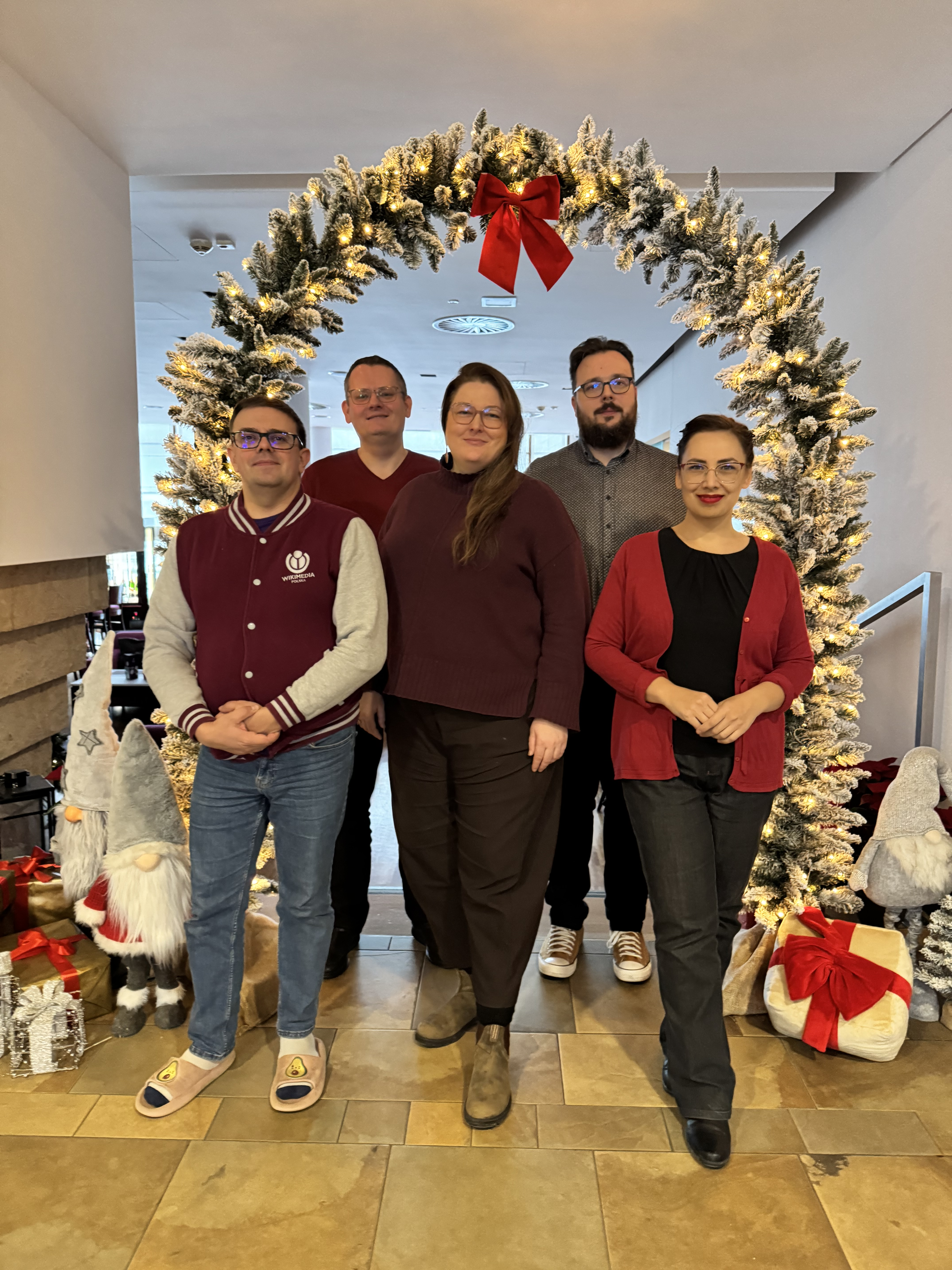
- The Wikimedia Polska Board: from left to right Marek Bukowski, Tomasz Wszeborowski, Julia Maria Koszewska, Grzegorz Gogacz, Maria Weronika Kmoch (2026)
- Abbreviation: WMPL
- Formation: 15 November 2005
- Registration no.: KRS 0000244732
- Legal status: Public benefit organization
- Purpose: To help people and organisations create and preserve open knowledge, to support various Wikimedia-related initiatives and to help provide easy access for all.
- Location: Warsaw, Poland
- Region served: Poland
- Methods: Public outreach
- Members: 113 (as of 12 June 2025)
- President of the Board: Tomasz Wszeborowski
- Secretary: Maria Weronika Kmoch
- Vice President of the Board: Julia Maria Koszewska
- Treasurer: Marek Bukowski
- Key people: Grzegorz Kopaczewski
- Affiliations: Wikimedia Foundation, Koalicja Otwartej Edukacji
- Website: wikimedia.pl

Wikimedia Polska (WMPL; Polish: Stowarzyszenie Wikimedia Polska) is a Polish public benefit organization established to support volunteers in Poland who work on Wikimedia projects such as Wikipedia. As such, it is a Wikimedia chapter approved by the Wikimedia Foundation which owns and hosts those projects.

Wikimedia Polska was started in April 2005 by a group of Polish Wikipedians at Meta-Wiki. In August of that year 26 first members gathered at a wiki meetup in Kraków to elect the board members and vote on the statute of the new association. It was officially registered on 15 November 2005. On 28 March 2007 Wikimedia Polska was officially inscribed on the list of public benefit organizations held by the Polish Ministry of Justice.

WMPL is headquartered in Warsaw (until 2021 it was headquartered in Łódź). As a Polish chapter of the Wikimedia Foundation, the WMPL collaborates with universities, schools, museums and other institutions and has organised events for volunteers aimed at adding content to Foundation projects.

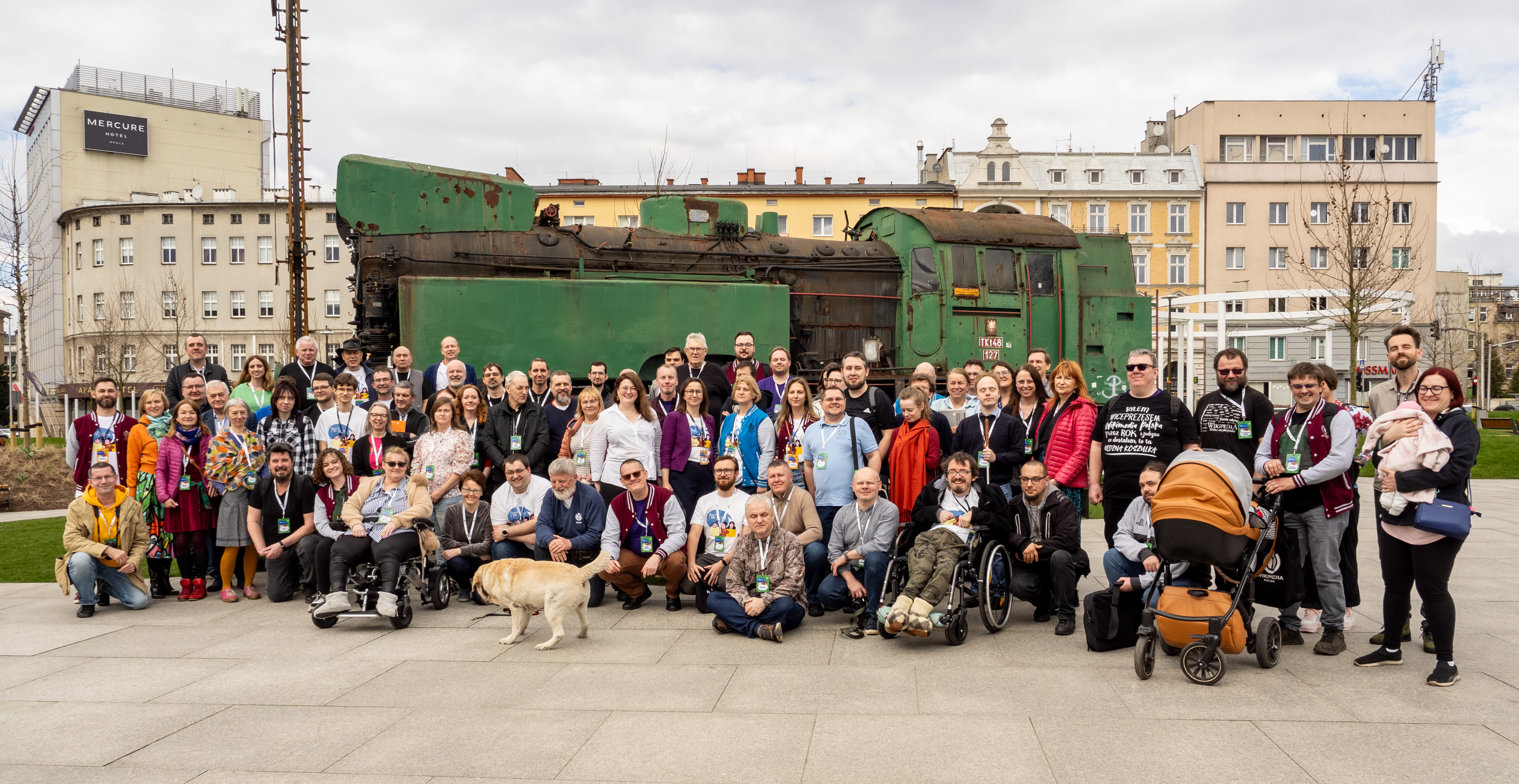
Attendees of 2024 Wikimedian meetup in Opole organised by Wikimedia Polska

== See also ==
- Open access in Poland
