= SpecGram =

SpecGram may refer to:

- Speculative Grammarian: a satirical linguistics journal.
- specgram, a time-dependent frequency analysis (spectrogram) tool in the Signal Processing Toolbox of MATLAB.
