= Wolne Lektury =

The Wolne Lektury foundation ("Free Reading"), known as Modern Poland Foundation (Polish: Fundacja Nowoczesna Polska) until 2023, is a Polish non-governmental organization (NGO) based in Warsaw, focused on building open educational resources, developing free digitalization technologies and influencing public policies in the field of digital rights.

Its main activists include Jarosław Lipszyc.

In 2008 it helped to establish the Koalicja Otwartej Edukacji.
