= Creative Commons Hungary =

Creative Commons Hungary (2008-2017) was a non-profit organization in Budapest, Hungary The self-organized society was established in 2008. The founders were gathered together from an online mailing-list, which was created for discussing copyrights of artists, the opportunity of copyleft and other libre culture themes.

When most of the original leaders left Hungary or became non-active, the association slowly eroded. It was deleted from the official registry on 6 February 2017.

== Foundation ==
In 2008 the founders were:

- Balázs Bodó (first chairman)
- Lóránt Dankaházi
- János Fehér
- Attila Kelényi
- Ákos Maróy
- Norbert Máté
- Rita Molnár
- Attila Szervác
- Balázs Szemes
- Márton Tóth
- Dániel Zrínyi

The main goal of the Creative Commons Hungary was to support the non-profit culture sector and provide the spread of Creative Commons licenses in Hungary.

== The Board ==
In 2013 the Board of Creative Commons consisted of:

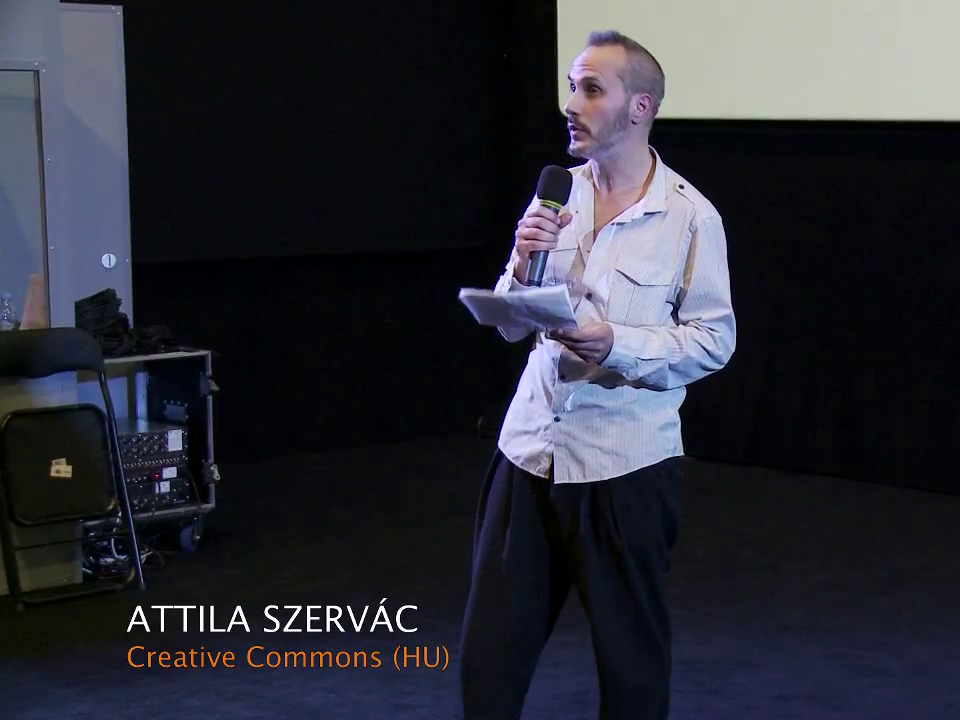
Attila Szervác, libre art contemporary composer, founder of CC.hu on libre culture, libre art, CopyCamp

- Attila Szervác (chairman)
- Lóránt Dankaházi
- Roland Hollós
- Zsuzsanna Horváth
- Attila Molnár

== Activity ==
Programs were declared for partnering and co-operation to support the goals of Creative Commons Hungary:

- Libre culture program (2013), founding the Libre art movement, 2014–2015
- Public domain program (2013)
