= Creative Commons =

Organization designing open copyright licenses

- Creative Commons Corporation
- Founded: January 15, 2001; 25 years ago
- Founder: Lawrence Lessig
- Type: 501(c)(3)
- Tax ID no.: 04-3585301
- Purpose: Expansion of "reasonable", flexible copyright
- Headquarters: Mountain View, California, U.S.
- Method: Creative Commons license
- Key people: Anna Tumadóttir (CEO)
- Revenue: ▲US$9.8 million (2021)
- Website: creativecommons.org

Creative Commons Corporation (CC) is an American nonprofit organization and international network devoted to educational access and expanding the range of creative works available for others to build upon legally and to share. The organization has released several copyright licenses, known as Creative Commons licenses (CC licenses), free of charge to the public, to allow authors of creative works to communicate which rights they reserve and which rights they waive for the benefit of recipients or other creators. Content owners still maintain their copyright, but Creative Commons licenses give standard releases that replace the individual negotiations for specific rights conducted between owners (licensors) and licensees under "all rights reserved" copyright.

As of 2019, there were "nearly 2 billion" works licensed under the various Creative Commons licenses. Wikipedia and its sister projects use one of these licenses. According to a 2017 report, Flickr alone hosted over 415 million cc-licensed photos, along with around 49 million works in YouTube, 40 million works in DeviantArt and 37 million works in Wikimedia Commons. The licenses are also used by Stack Exchange, MDN, Internet Archive, Khan Academy, LibreTexts, OpenStax, MIT OpenCourseWare, WikiHow, TED, OpenStreetMap, GeoGebra, Doubtnut, Fandom, Arduino, ccmixter.org, and Ninjam, among others, and formerly by Unsplash, Pixabay, and Socratic.

== History ==
The organization was founded in 2001 by Lawrence Lessig, Hal Abelson, and Eric Eldred, with the support of Center for the Public Domain. The first article in a general interest publication about Creative Commons, written by Hal Plotkin, was published in February 2002. The first set of copyright licenses was released in December 2002 (original press release was dated 16th December, 2002). The founding management team that developed the licenses and built the Creative Commons infrastructure as it is known today included Molly Shaffer Van Houweling, Glenn Otis Brown, Neeru Paharia, and Ben Adida.

In 2002, Creative Commons was selected as the successor of the Open Content Project, a 1998 precursor project by David A. Wiley. Wiley subsequently joined Creative Commons as its director. The licenses published by the Open Content Project, the Open Content License and Open Publication License, were soon deprecated in favour of Creative Commons licenses. Aaron Swartz played a role in the early stages of Creative Commons, as did Matthew Haughey.

== Purpose and goal ==
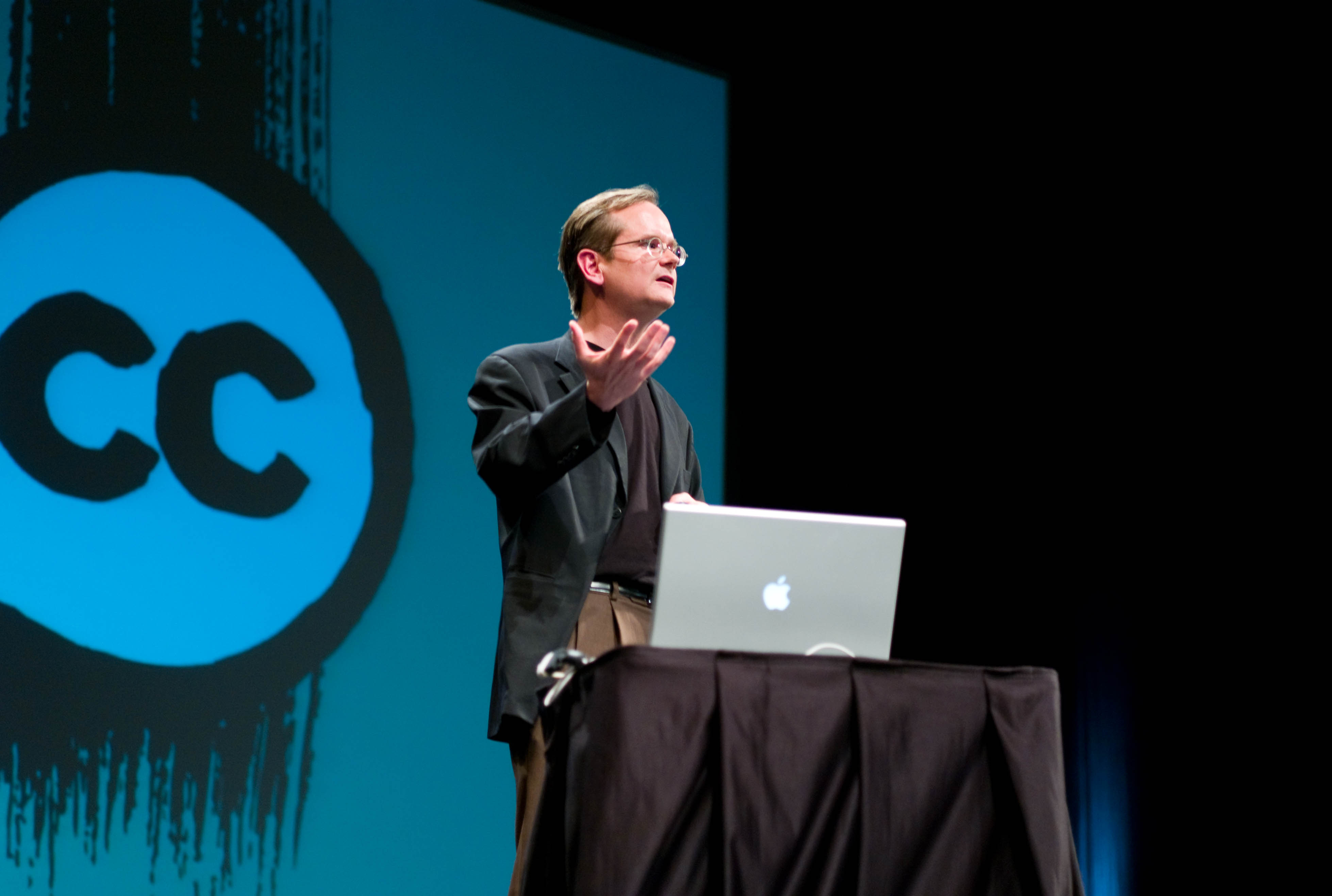
Lawrence Lessig (January 2008)

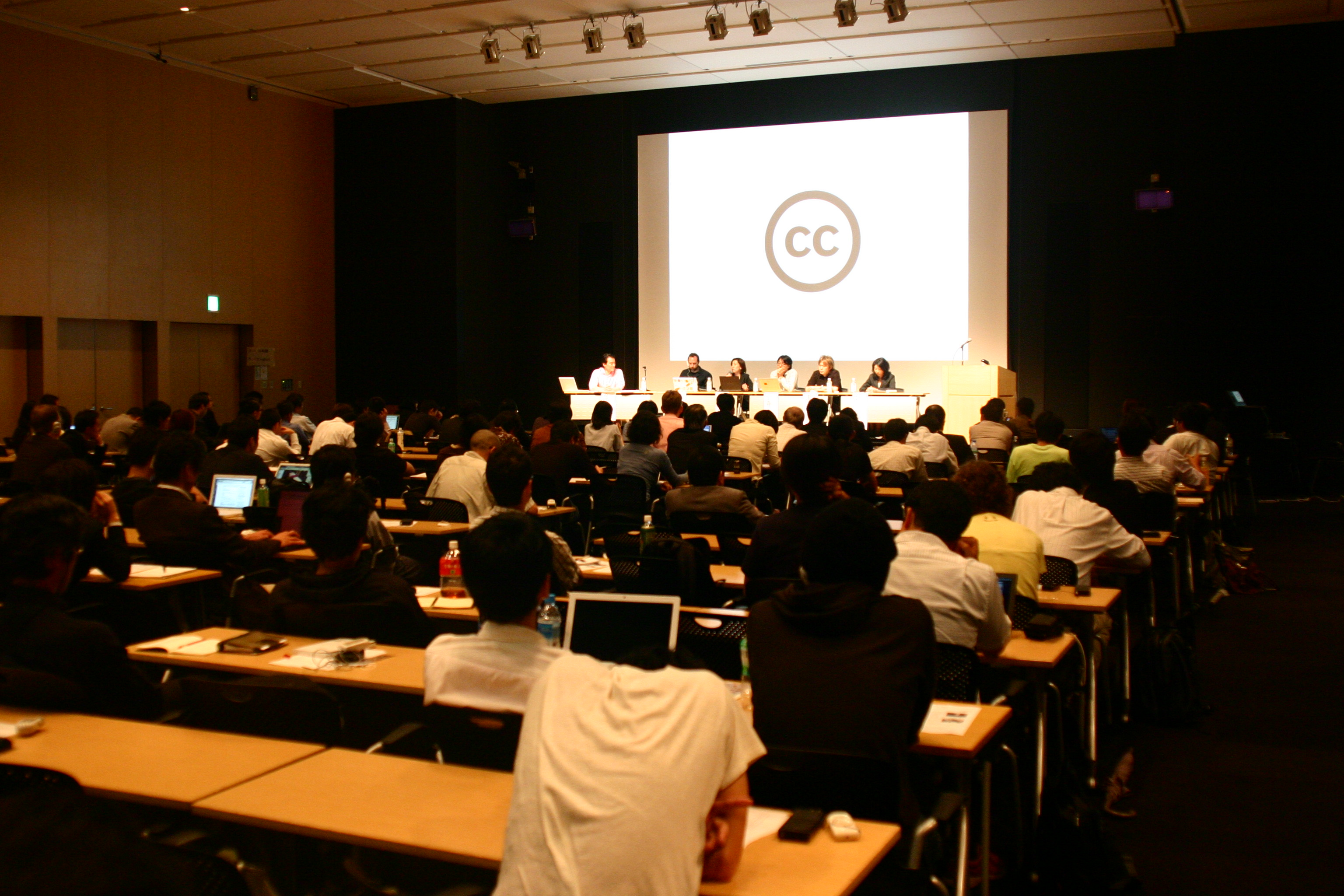
Creative Commons Japan Seminar, Tokyo (2007)

CC some rights reserved

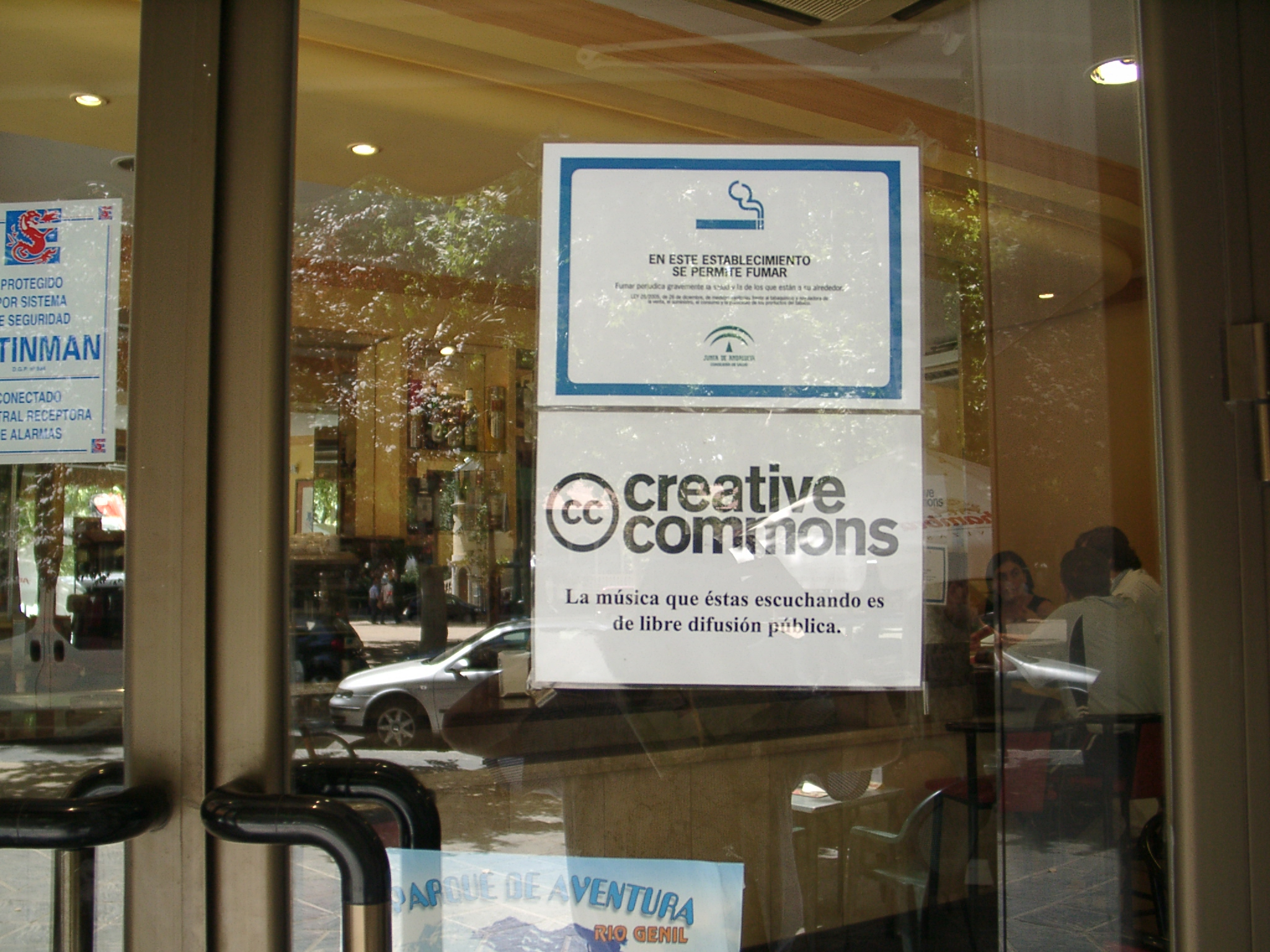
A sign in a pub in Granada notifies customers that the music they are listening to is freely distributable under a Creative Commons license.

Made with Creative Commons, a 2017 book describing the value of CC licenses

Creative Commons has been an early participant in the copyleft movement, which seeks to provide alternative solutions to copyright, and has been dubbed "some rights reserved". Creative Commons has been credited with contributing to a re-thinking of the role of the "commons" in the Information Age. Their frameworks help individuals and groups distribute content more freely while still protecting themselves and their intellectual property rights legally.

According to its founder Lawrence Lessig, Creative Commons' goal is to counter the dominant and increasingly restrictive permission culture that limits artistic creation to existing or powerful creators. Lessig maintains that modern culture is dominated by traditional content distributors in order to maintain and strengthen their monopolies on cultural products such as popular music and popular cinema, and that Creative Commons can provide alternatives to these restrictions. In mid‑December 2020, Creative Commons released its strategy for the upcoming five years, which will focus more on three core of goals including advocacy, infrastructure innovation, and capacity building.

== Creative Commons network ==
Until April 2018, Creative Commons had over 100 affiliates working in over 75 jurisdictions to support and promote CC activities around the world. In 2018 this affiliate network has been restructured into a network organisation. The network no longer relies on affiliate organisation but on individual membership organised in Chapter.

=== Hungary ===
Creative Commons Hungary was the affiliated network of Creative Commons in Hungary. The non-profit organization was founded in Budapest, Hungary, in 2008 and was deleted from the official registry on February 6, 2017.

=== Japan ===
Creative Commons Japan (CC Japan/CCJP) is the affiliated network of Creative Commons in Japan. In 2003, the International University GLOCOM held a meeting for the CC Japan preparation. In March 2004, CC Japan was launched by GLOCOM University. CC Japan is the world's second CC affiliated network (the first is in America). In March 2006, CC Japan become the NPO and be in motion. In the same month, the CC founder Lawrence Lessig came to Japan to be one of the main holders of the open ceremony. Within the same year, between May and June, different international events were held in Japan, including iSummit 06 and the first through third rounds of CCJP.

In February 2007, the ICC x ClipLife 15 second CM competition was held. In June, iSummit 07 was held. In July, the fourth CCJP was held. On July 25, Tokyo approved Nobuhiro Nakayama (中山信弘) to become the NGO chairman of CCJP. In 2008, Taipie ACIA joined CCJP. The main theme music which was chosen by CCJP was announced. In 2009, INTO INFINITY shown in Tokyo and Sapporo. iPhone held the shows with Audio Visual Mixer for INTO INFINITY. (Apple joint research and development with CCJP) In 2012, the 10th anniversary ceremony was held in Japan. In 2015, Creative Commons 4.0 and Creative Commons 0 were released in Japanese language.

=== South Korea ===
Creative Commons Korea (CC Korea) is the affiliated network of Creative Commons in South Korea. In March 2005, CC Korea was initiated by Jongsoo Yoon (in Korean: 윤종수), former Presiding Judge of Incheon District Court, as a project of Korea Association for Infomedia Law (KAFIL). The major Korean portal sites, including Daum and Naver, have been participating in the use of Creative Commons licences. In January 2009, the Creative Commons Korea Association was consequently founded as a non-profit incorporated association. Since then, CC Korea has been actively promoting the liberal and open culture of creation as well as leading the diffusion of Creative Common in the country.

- Creative Commons Korea
- Creative Commons Asia Conference 2010

=== Bassel Khartabil ===
Bassel Khartabil was a Palestinian Syrian open source software developer who served as a project lead and public affiliate for Creative Commons Syria. On March 15, 2012, he was detained by the Syrian government in Damascus at Adra Prison for no crime. On October 17, 2015, the Creative Commons Board of Directors passed a resolution calling for Bassel Khartabil's release. In 2017, Bassel's wife received confirmation that Bassel had been killed shortly after she lost contact with him in 2015.

== Evolution of CC licenses ==
All current CC licenses (except the CC0 Public Domain Dedication tool) require attribution (attributing the authors of the original creative works), which can be inconvenient for works based on multiple other works. Critics feared that Creative Commons could erode the copyright system over time, or allow "some of our most precious resources – the creativity of individuals – to be simply tossed into the commons to be exploited by whomever has spare time and a magic marker." Critics also worried that the lack of rewards for content producers would dissuade artists from publishing their work, and questioned whether Creative Commons would enable the commons that it aimed to create.

Creative Commons founder Lawrence Lessig countered that copyright laws have not always offered the strong and seemingly indefinite protection that today's law provides. Rather, the duration of copyright used to be limited to much shorter terms of years, and some works never gained protection because they did not follow the now-abandoned compulsory format. The maintainers of Debian, a Linux distribution known for its strict adherence to a particular definition of software freedom, rejected the Creative Commons Attribution License prior to version 3 as incompatible with the Debian Free Software Guidelines (DFSG) due to the license's anti-DRM provisions (which might, due to ambiguity, be covering more than DRM) and its requirement that downstream users remove an author's credit upon request from the author. Version 3.0 of the Creative Commons licenses addressed these concerns and, except for the non commercial and no-derivative variants, are considered to be compatible with the DFSG.

Kent Anderson, writing for The Scholarly Kitchen, a blog of the Society for Scholarly Publishing, criticized CC as being grounded on copyright principles and not really departing from it, and as being more complex and complicating than the latter – thus the public does not scrutinize CC, reflexively accepting it as one would a software license – while at the same time weakening the rights provided by copyright. Anderson ends up concluding that this is the point, and that "Creative Commons receives significant funding from large information companies like Google, Nature Publishing Group, and RedHat", and that Google money is especially linked to CC's history; for him, CC is "an organization designed to promulgate the interests of technology companies and Silicon Valley generally".

=== CC license proliferation ===
According to Mako Hill, Creative Commons has established a range of licenses tailored to meet the different protection interests of authors of creative works, rather than forcing a single forced standard as a "base level of freedom" that all Creative Commons licenses must meet, and with which all licensors and users must comply. "By failing to take any firm ethical position and draw any line in the sand, CC is a missed opportunity. ...CC has replaced what could have been a call for a world where 'essential rights are unreservable' with the relatively hollow call for 'some rights reserved.'" He also argued that Creative Commons enables license proliferation, by providing multiple licenses that are incompatible.

The Creative Commons website states, "Since each of the six CC licenses functions differently, resources placed under different licenses may not necessarily be combined with one another without violating the license terms." Works licensed under incompatible licenses may not be recombined in a derivative work without obtaining permission from the copyright owner. Richard Stallman of the Free Software Foundation stated in 2005 that he could not support Creative Commons as an activity because "it adopted some additional licenses which do not give everyone that minimum freedom", that freedom being "the freedom to share, noncommercially, any published work". Those licenses have since been retired by Creative Commons.

=== License uses ===
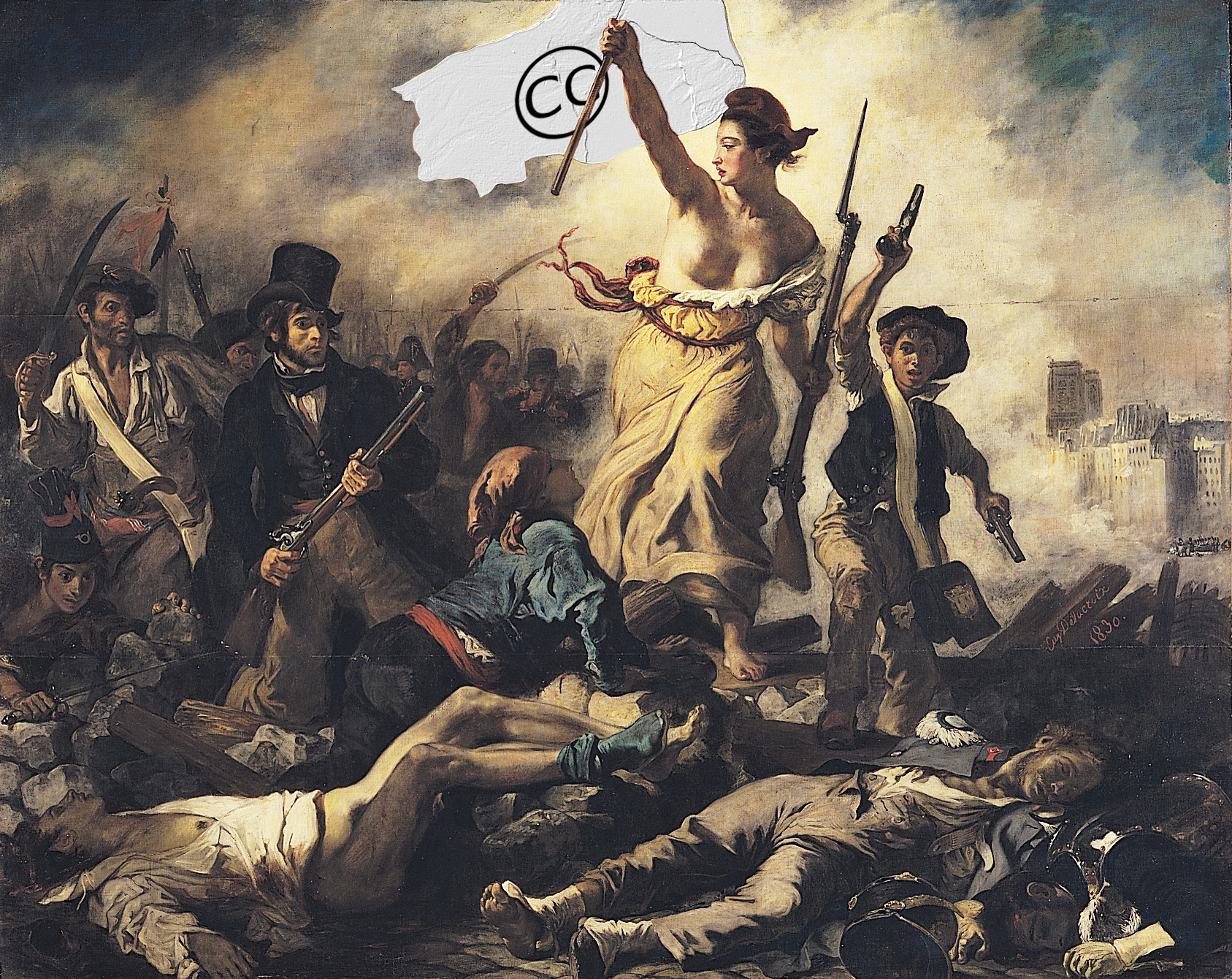
Creative Commons guiding the contributors. This image is a derivative work of Liberty Leading the People by Eugène Delacroix.

Creative Commons is only a service provider for standardized license text, not a party in any agreement. No central database of Creative Commons works is controlling all licensed works and the responsibility of the Creative Commons system rests entirely with those using the licences. This situation is, however, not specific to Creative Commons. All copyright owners must individually defend their rights and no central database of copyrighted works or existing license agreements exists. The United States Copyright Office does keep a database of all works registered with it, but absence of registration does not imply absence of copyright, and CC licensed works can be registered on the same terms as unlicensed works or works licensed under any other licences.

Although Creative Commons offers multiple licenses for different uses, some critics suggested that the licenses still do not address the differences among the media or among the various concerns that different authors have. Lessig wrote that the point of Creative Commons is to provide a middle ground between two extreme views of copyright protection – one demanding that all rights be controlled, and the other arguing that none should be controlled. Creative Commons provides a third option that allows authors to pick and choose which rights they want to control and which they want to grant to others. The multitude of licenses reflects the multitude of rights that can be passed on to subsequent creators.

=== Non-commercial use licenses ===
"Defining 'Noncommercial'", a 2009 report from Creative Commons on the concept of noncommercial media

Various commentators have reported confusion in understanding what "noncommercial" use means. Creative Commons issued a report in 2009, "Defining noncommercial", which presented research and various perspectives. The report claimed that noncommercial to many people means "no exchange of money or any commerce". Beyond that simple statement, many people disagree on whether noncommercial use permits publishing on websites supported with advertising, sharing noncommercial media through nonprofit publishing for a fee, and many other practices in contemporary media distribution. Creative Commons has not sought to resolve the confusion, in part because of high consumer demand for the noncommercial license as is with its ambiguity.

=== Personality rights ===
In 2007, Virgin Mobile Australia launched a bus stop advertising campaign which promoted its mobile phone text messaging service using the work of amateur photographers who uploaded their work to the photo-sharing site Flickr using a Creative Commons by Attribution license. Users licensing their images this way freed their work for use by any other entity, as long as the original creator was attributed credit, without any other compensation being required. Virgin upheld this single restriction by printing a URL, leading to the photographer's Flickr page, on each of their ads. However, one picture depicted 15-year-old Alison Chang posing for a photo at her church's fund-raising carwash, with the superimposed, mocking slogan "Dump Your Pen Friend". Chang sued Virgin Mobile and Creative Commons. The photo was taken by Chang's church youth counsellor, Justin Ho-Wee Wong, who uploaded the image to Flickr under the Creative Commons license.

The case hinges on privacy, the right of people not to have their likeness used in an ad without permission. So, while Mr. Wong may have given away his rights as a photographer, he did not, and could not, give away Alison's rights. In the lawsuit, which Mr. Wong is also a party to, there is an argument that Virgin did not honor all the terms of the nonrestrictive license.

On November 27, 2007, Chang voluntarily dismissed the lawsuit against Creative Commons, focusing the lawsuit only against Virgin Mobile. The case was dismissed due to lack of jurisdiction and subsequently Virgin Mobile did not incur any damages towards the plaintiff.

== See also ==
A video that can be used to explain what Creative Commons is

- Copyleft
- Free content
- Free-culture movement
- List of major Creative Commons licensed works
- Open-source license
- Public-domain-equivalent license

== Bibliography ==
- Ardito, Stephanie C. (2003). "Public-Domain Advocacy Flourishes". Information Today. 20 (7): 17, 19.
- Asschenfeldt, Christiane. "Copyright and Licensing Issues—The International Commons. Archived January 25, 2012, at the Wayback Machine" In CERN Workshop Series on Innovations in Scholarly Communication: Implementing the Benefits of OAI (OAI3), February 12–14, 2004 at CERN, Geneva, Switzerland. Geneva: CERN, 2004. (video)
- Brown, Glenn Otis. "Academic Digital Rights: A Walk on the Creative Commons." Syllabus Magazine (April 2003).
- "Out of the Way: How the Next Copyright Revolution Can Help the Next Scientific Revolution. Archived August 27, 2011, at the Wayback Machine" PLoS Biology 1, no. 1 (2003): 30–31.
- Chillingworth, Mark. "Creative Commons Attracts BBC's Attention." Information World Review, June 11, 2004.
- Conhaim, Wallys W. (2002). "Creative Commons Nurtures the Public Domain". Information Today. 19 (7): 52, 54. Archived from the original on January 19, 2012.
- "Delivering Classics Resources with TEI-XML, Open Source, and Creative Commons Licenses". Cover Pages. April 28, 2004. Archived from the original on February 8, 2005.
- Denison, D.C. "For Creators, An Argument for Alienable Rights." Boston Globe, December 22, 2002, E2.
- Ermert, Monika (June 15, 2004). "Germany Debuts Creative Commons". The Register. Archived from the original on August 22, 2017.
- Fitzgerald, Brian, and Ian Oi. "Free Culture: Cultivating the Creative Commons. Archived October 3, 2011, at the Wayback Machine" (2004).
- Hietanen, Herkko "The Pursuit of Efficient Copyright Licensing — How Some Rights Reserved Attempts to Solve the Problems of All Rights Reserved" (2008) PhD dissertation.
- Johnstone, Sally M. (2003). "Sharing Educational Materials Without Losing Rights". Change. 35 (6): 49–51.
- Kreutzer, Till. "Open Content - Navigating Creative Commons Licenses Archived January 15, 2025, at the Wayback Machine", Deutsche UNESCO-Kommission e. V., Wikimedia Deutschland - Gesellschaft zur Förderung Freien Wissens e. V., 2024.
- Lessig, Lawrence (2003). "The Creative Commons". Florida Law Review. 55: 763–777.
- Möller, Erik (2006). "The Case for Free Use: Reasons Not to Use a Creative Commons -NC License" (PDF). Open Source Jahrbuch. Archived (PDF) from the original on April 10, 2008.
- Plotkin, Hal (February 11, 2002). "All Hail Creative Commons: Stanford Professor and Author Lawrence Lessig Plans a Legal Insurrection". SFGate. Archived from the original on June 24, 2005.
- Richard, Phillip (October 2012). "Copyright Inefficiency". Music Business Journal. Berklee College of Music. Archived from the original on November 1, 2012.
- Schloman, Barbara F. (October 13, 2003). "Creative Commons: An Opportunity to Extend the Public Domain". Online Journal of Issues in Nursing. 9 (1): 16. PMID 14998356. Archived from the original on October 22, 2003.
- Stix, Gary (March 2003). "Some Rights Reserved". Scientific American. 288 (3): 46. Bibcode:2003SciAm.288c..46S. doi:10.1038/scientificamerican0303-46. S2CID 121704427. Archived from the original on September 15, 2005.
- Weitzman, Jonathan B.; Lessig, Lawrence (May 10, 2004). "Open Access and Creative Common Sense". Open Access Now. Archived from the original on May 30, 2007.
