= Eric Schulman =

American astronomer

Eric Schulman is an American astronomer and science humorist. Schulman received his bachelor's degree from UCLA and his PhD from the University of Michigan. He is the author of A Briefer History of Time: From the Big Bang to the Big Mac (1999) and has been a member of the editorial board of the Annals of Improbable Research since 1998. He sometimes uses the pen name E. Robert Schulman when writing science humor articles. Schulman was the first "Armchair Astrophysics" columnist for the Astronomical Society of the Pacific's Mercury Magazine (he was succeeded by Christopher Wanjek in 2001).

Schulman is married to Caroline Virginia Cox (an astronomer in her own right) and they are the parents of one daughter, Emily. Both Caroline and Emily have been featured in Schulman's writings; for example, Schulman writes a detailed scientific paper on how to write a science fair project, which is a humorous and exaggerated rewrite of Emily's own writeup of her project. In another case, the three are featured in Schulman's writeup of Emily (11 months at the time) attempting to stack rings on a ring tower.
