= Anna Tumadóttir =

CEO of Creative Commons

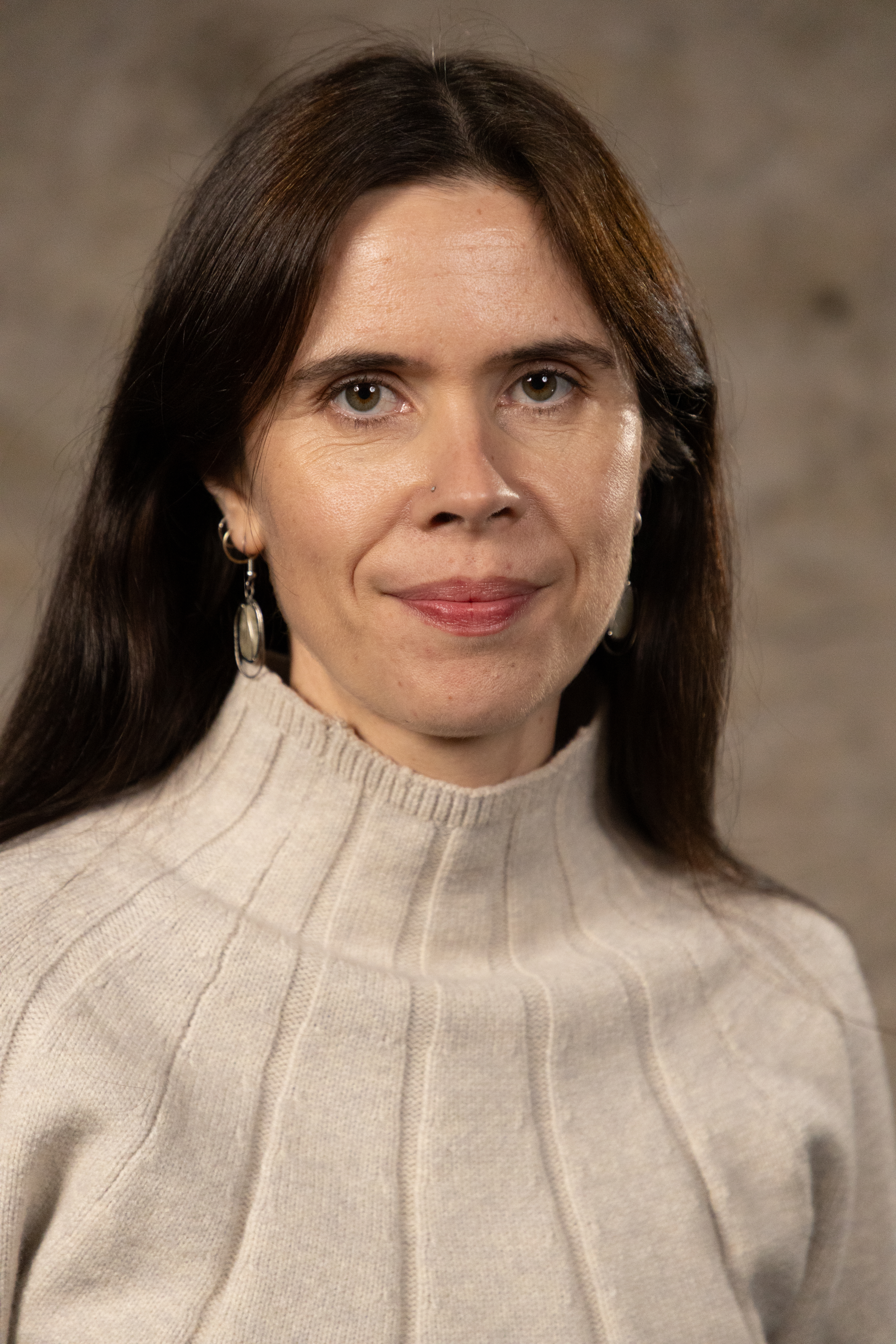
- Tumadóttir in 2025
- Occupation: CEO
- Known for: CEO of Creative Commons since 2024

Anna Tumadóttir is the CEO of the American non-profit organization Creative Commons since April 2024.

Tumadóttir was raised in several countries, including Iceland, Scotland and Malawi. She studied in Norway and then continued her studies in the United States and South Africa.

She started her professional career working for marketing start-ups, specialising for a decade in the operations area. She joined Creative Commons in 2019 as Director of Product. Then in 2021, she was promoted to chief operating officer. In January 2024, Catherine Stihler, Creative Commons CEO at the time, stepped down and Tumadóttir became interim CEO. On April 10, 2024, the Board of Directors of Creative Commons appointed her as the organization's new CEO. She lives in Austin, Texas.
