= Feline Fuelled Games =

German PC game development team

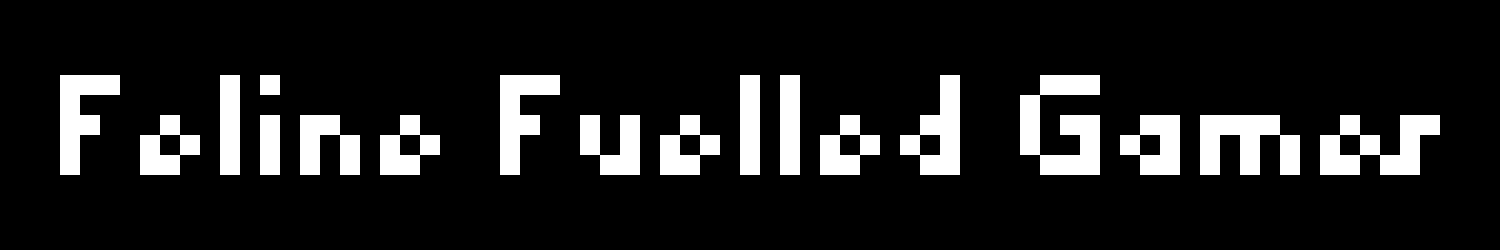
- Abbreviation: FFG
- Formation: 29 September 2005; 21 years ago
- Purpose: Development of PC games
- Location: Germany
- Lead developer: Ute Knörzer
- Volunteers: 20
- Website: Feline Fuelled Games

Feline Fuelled Games is a German PC game development team whose mods for the role-playing games Neverwinter Nights 2 by Obsidian and Dragon Age: Origins by BioWare have received critical acclaim in the German video game press. On 5 May 2017, they published their first original game, the point-and-click adventure Sandra and Woo in the Cursed Adventure based on the webcomic Sandra and Woo.

== History ==
=== Mods for Neverwinter Nights ===
Under the name Silberwald-Team, lead developer Oliver Knörzer and several other team members, among them Eric Dunkel and Matthias Geißler, developed the role-playing campaign Silberwald: Der Ring des Schicksals (Silver Forest: The Ring of Destiny) for BioWare's Neverwinter Nights. The mod was released on 21 July 2003 and became a surprise hit with more than 30,000 downloads at the biggest Neverwinter Nights fansite NWVault. Silberwald: Der Ring des Schicksals received an overall score of 78% in a test by Georg Valentin of the second largest German game magazine GameStar, and it was the subject of the TV show GIGA Games which aired on 25 July 2003.

Oliver's mother Ute Knörzer, who designed levels and wrote dialog for Silberwald: Der Ring des Schicksals, then moved on to develop the mods Silberwald Saga: Dunkle Sonne (Silver Forest Legend: Dark Sun), a spin-off of the original Silberwald campaign, and Das Lied der Götter for Neverwinter Nights. The latter one was later translated into English under the title The Song Divine and got included in NWVault’s Hall of Fame list.

=== Mods for Neverwinter Nights 2 ===
After Neverwinter Nights 2 was announced by Obsidian, Oliver Knörzer and Ute Knörzer began the development of a new campaign called Gaia: Chroniken des 3. Zeitalters (Gaia: Chronicles of the Third Age) for it in 2004. Some old and new team members joined them over the course of 2004 and 2005 and the mod group was given its name Feline Fuelled Games on 29 September 2005, referring a story arc of the webcomic Dragon Tails about an incompetent video game developer company. The project turned out to be too ambitious, though, and was eventually cancelled in 2006 with Oliver Knörzer also resigning as lead developer. However, Feline Fuelled Games, now led by Ute Knörzer, managed to release several other mods during the next years and grew to 20 team members at the peak in March 2012, including the second lead developer Walter Oswald. The release of a new mod, like that of the fourth chapter of the Planescape: Die Traumfängerin series, was usually mentioned on German video game websites such as GameCaptain, Gamezone and Gameswelt.

==== Herz der Finsternis ====
The first mod released by Feline Fuelled Games was Herz der Finsternis (Heart of Darkness) on 9 December 2007, which was developed by Ute Knörzer. Herz der Finsternis is the direct sequel of Das Lied der Götter and was praised by Andreas Bertits as “a fantastic adventure” that “no fan of the main game [Neverwinter Nights 2] and fantasy stories should miss” in his reviews of the campaign for the game magazines PC Games and PC Action.

==== Der Fluch der Zwerge series ====
The release of Herz der Finsternis was followed by the release of the first part of the Der Fluch der Zwerge (The Curse of the Dwarfs) series by lead developer Walter Oswald on 5 March 2008. Its second chapter was described by Andreas Bertits of PC Games as an “extensive and exciting adventure” and his colleague Marc Brehme wrote in his review of the first part of the third chapter that they (the PC Games team) were once again “convinced by the quality of the fan extension.” On 3 May 2014, the fifth and last part of the Der Fluch der Zwerge series was released.

==== Planescape: Die Traumfängerin series ====
After the release of Herz der Finsternis, Ute Knörzer began the development of the Planescape: Die Traumfängerin (Planescape: The Shaper of Dreams) series, the team's most ambitious project so far. The first chapter of the story set in the Planescape setting was released on 11 August 2008 and the sixth and last chapter on 30 August 2009. Planescape: Die Traumfängerin received the most critical acclaim of all mods developed by Feline Fuelled Games with Andreas Bertits of PC Games giving the following review of the second chapter: “The mod by Ute Knörzer will take you into a strange but fascinating world. The appealing story motivates to continue playing with lots of puzzles and twists. The varied and pretty areas, the game changing decisions, the many interesting non-player characters and the exciting fights create a unique gaming experience.” The campaign also got translated into English over the course of the following years. In May 2010, the translated version of the mod was the second highest rated mod on NWVault’s top list with a score of 9.91 out of 10.

=== Mods for Dragon Age: Origin ===
==== Synapsia ====
On 17 July 2010, Feline Fuelled Games released Synapsia, their first mod for Dragon Age: Origins. It was rated as an “outstanding” mod in a review by Marc Brehme for PC Action. The humorous campaign is an extended version of the original mod for Neverwinter Nights 2 with the same title by Gabriele Schmied, which was originally published on 12 December 2009.

==== Chroniken von Coldramar ====
On 16 October 2011, Feline Fuelled Games released Chroniken von Coldramar (Chronicles of Coldramar), a campaign for Dragon Age: Origins centering on the adventures of three young barbarians. As Feline Fuelled Games' most advanced mod so far, Chroniken von Coldramar featured a full voice-over carried out by professional voice artists, custom music and almost 90 minutes of cutscenes. In his three-page review of the modification in PC Action, Mark Brehme concluded that it “turned out so well that it may likely pass as an add-on you have to pay for.”

=== Sandra and Woo in the Cursed Adventure ===
In summer 2012, Feline Fuelled Games began the development of a point-and-click adventure based on Oliver Knörzer’s webcomic Sandra and Woo called Sandra and Woo in the Cursed Adventure. It features all the main characters from the comic. It's the team’s first original game and uses the Adventure Game Engine by Visionaire Studio. On 30 April 2015, the first screenshots of the game were uploaded to the webcomic's website. The game was eventually released on Steam on 5 May 2017 to mixed reviews from video game critics. In his review for Adventure Gamers (3.5/5 stars), Peter Mattsson was fond of the likeable characters and the interesting story, but criticized the design of some of the puzzles and minigames. Susanne Lang-Vorhofer from the German website Adventure Corner also liked the characters and the story, but had a very negative opinion about the German voice-over, giving the game a score of 68% in the end.

== List of released games ==
=== Mods ===
Title	Release date	Platform	Lead developer
Silberwald: Der Ring des Schicksals	21 July 2003	Neverwinter Nights	Oliver Knörzer
Silberwald Saga: Dunkle Sonne	23 May 2004	Neverwinter Nights	Ute Knörzer
Das Lied der Götter (en.) The Song Divine	19 November 2004; 14 September 2006	Neverwinter Nights + SoU + HotU + CEP	Ute Knörzer
Herz der Finsternis	9 December 2007	Neverwinter Nights 2	Ute Knörzer
Der Fluch der Zwerge 1 – Die Suche beginnt	5 March 2008	Neverwinter Nights 2 + MotB	Walter Oswald
Planescape: Die Traumfängerin 1 – Tod und Stern (en.) Planescape: The Shaper of Dreams 1	11 August 2008; 10 January 2010	Neverwinter Nights 2 + MotB	Ute Knörzer
Planescape: Die Traumfängerin 2 – Der Hierophant (en.) Planescape: The Shaper of Dreams 2 – The Hierophant	25 October 2008; 10 January 2010	Neverwinter Nights 2 + MotB	Ute Knörzer
Planescape: Die Traumfängerin 3 – Die Hohepriesterin (en.) Planescape: The Shaper of Dreams 3 – The High Priestess	20 December 2008; 5 April 2011	Neverwinter Nights 2 + MotB	Ute Knörzer
Planescape: Die Traumfängerin 4 – Das Rad des Schicksals (en.) Planescape: The Shaper of Dreams 4 – The Wheel of Fortune	10 March 2009; 27 July 2013	Neverwinter Nights 2 + MotB	Ute Knörzer
Planescape: Die Traumfängerin 5 – Der Teufel (en.) Planescape: The Shaper of Dreams 5 – The Devil	30 May 2009 24 November 2022	Neverwinter Nights 2 + MotB	Ute Knörzer
Der Fluch der Zwerge 2 – Der Helm der Halblinge	15 June 2009	Neverwinter Nights 2 + MotB	Walter Oswald
Planescape: Die Traumfängerin 6 – Die Liebenden (en.) Planescape: The Shaper of Dreams 6 – The Lovers	30 August 2009 1 November 2025	Neverwinter Nights 2 + MotB	Ute Knörzer
Planescape: Die Traumfängerin – Komplettausgabe	3 October 2009	Neverwinter Nights 2 + MotB	Ute Knörzer
Synapsia	12 December 2009	Neverwinter Nights 2 + MotB	Gabriele Schmied
Der Fluch der Zwerge 3 – Wege ins Dunkel, Kapitel 1 – Auf dem Fluss	21 February 2010	Neverwinter Nights 2 + MotB	Walter Oswald
Synapsia	17 July 2010	Dragon Age: Origins	Ute Knörzer
Der Fluch der Zwerge 3 – Wege ins Dunkel, Kapitel 2 – Zurück zu deinen Wurzeln	25 January 2011	Neverwinter Nights 2 + MotB	Walter Oswald
Chroniken von Coldramar	16 October 2011	Dragon Age: Origins	Ute Knörzer
Buch der Spiegel	4 March 2012	Neverwinter Nights 2 + MotB + SoZ	Gabriele Schmied
Erbe der vergessenen Schätze	24 December 2012	Skyrim	Walter Oswald
Der Fluch der Zwerge 3 – Wege ins Dunkel, Kapitel 3 – Elfen und Drow	3 May 2014	Neverwinter Nights 2 + MotB	Walter Oswald

=== Original games ===
Title	Release date	Engine	Lead developer
Sandra and Woo in the Cursed Adventure	5 May 2017	Adventure Game Engine	Ute Knörzer & Stefan Müller
