= Jarosław Lipszyc =

Polish poet and journalist

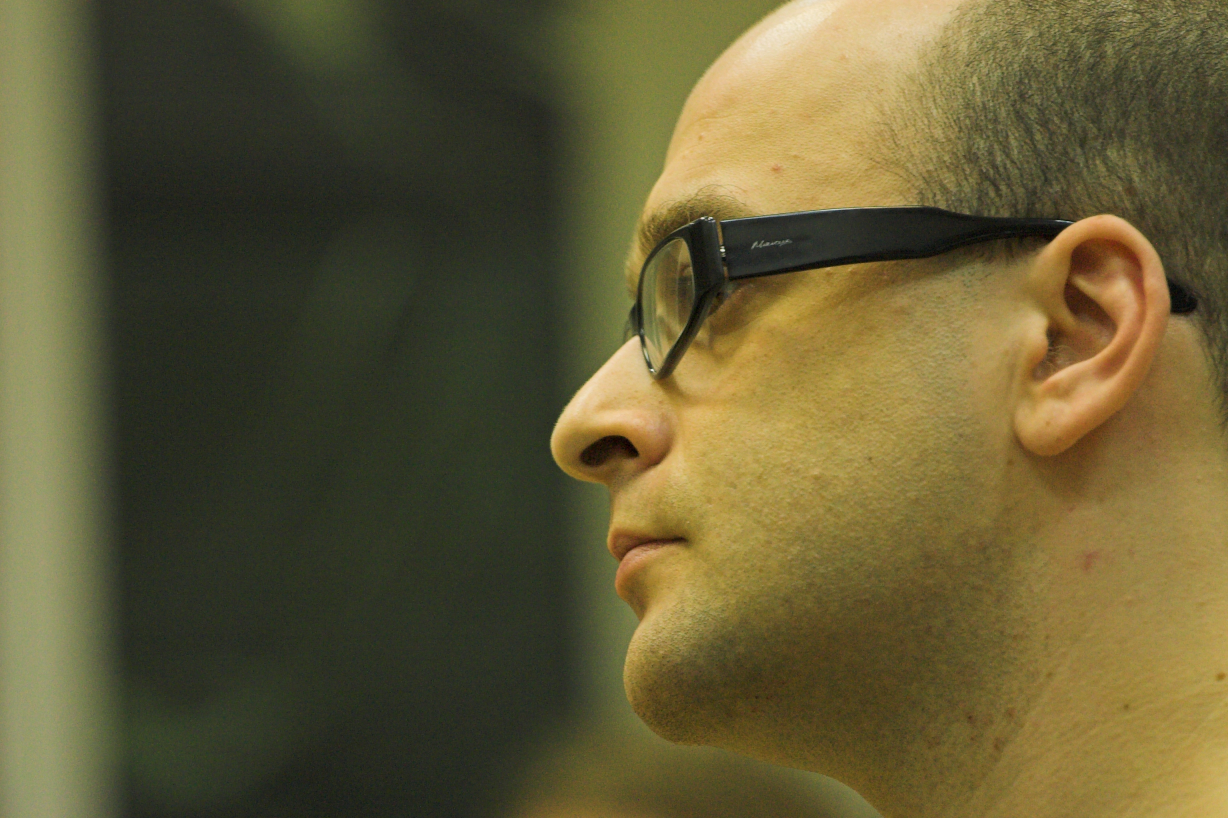
- Jarosław Lipszyc
- Awards: Gold Cross of Merit

Jarosław Lipszyc (born 1975) is a Polish poet and journalist, president of the board of Fundacja Nowoczesna Polska (Modern Poland Foundation) and of the Koalicja Otwartej Edukacji (Open Education Coalition), free culture activist.

He has been decorated with the Gold Cross of Merit.

He published three volumes of poetry:

- bólion w kostce (Warszawa 1997, Lampa i Iskra Boża)
- poczytalnia (Warszawa 2000, Lampa i Iskra Boża)
- Mnemotechniki (Warszawa 2008)
