= A Briefer History of Time (Schulman book) =

Science humor book by the American astronomer Eric Schulman

- Cover of A Briefer History of Time
- Author: Eric Schulman
- Language: English
- Subject: History of the universe
- Genre: Science humor; popular science
- Published: May 1999 (W. H. Freeman and Company)
- Publication place: United States
- Media type: Print (trade paperback)
- Pages: 171
- ISBN: 0-7167-3389-7
- LC Class: QB982 .S38 1999

A Briefer History of Time is a science humor book by American astronomer Eric Schulman. In it, Schulman presents humorous summaries of what he claims are the fifty-three most important events since the beginning of time. The title and cover are a parody of Stephen Hawking's book A Brief History of Time. Coincidentally, Hawking later wrote a "sequel" entitled A Briefer History of Time. Hawking's publisher Bantam Books was aware that the title had already been used in a popular science book, but proceeded anyway, stating, "The other book was published six years ago, and Professor Hawking is an international figure."

In 2004, the author released the book under a creative commons license, CC BY-NC-ND 1.0, as a free download on his website.

== Description ==
Schulman's book is intended to be both humorous and educational. It explores why, even though the Universe is expanding, finding a parking space does not get any easier. Furthermore, the book contains a pulp version of the origin of life ("It was a dark and stormy night. In the shallow tide pool, a nucleic acid base collided with a sugar molecule. An amino acid sank beneath the murky depths . . . .").
