= Coalition for Open Education =

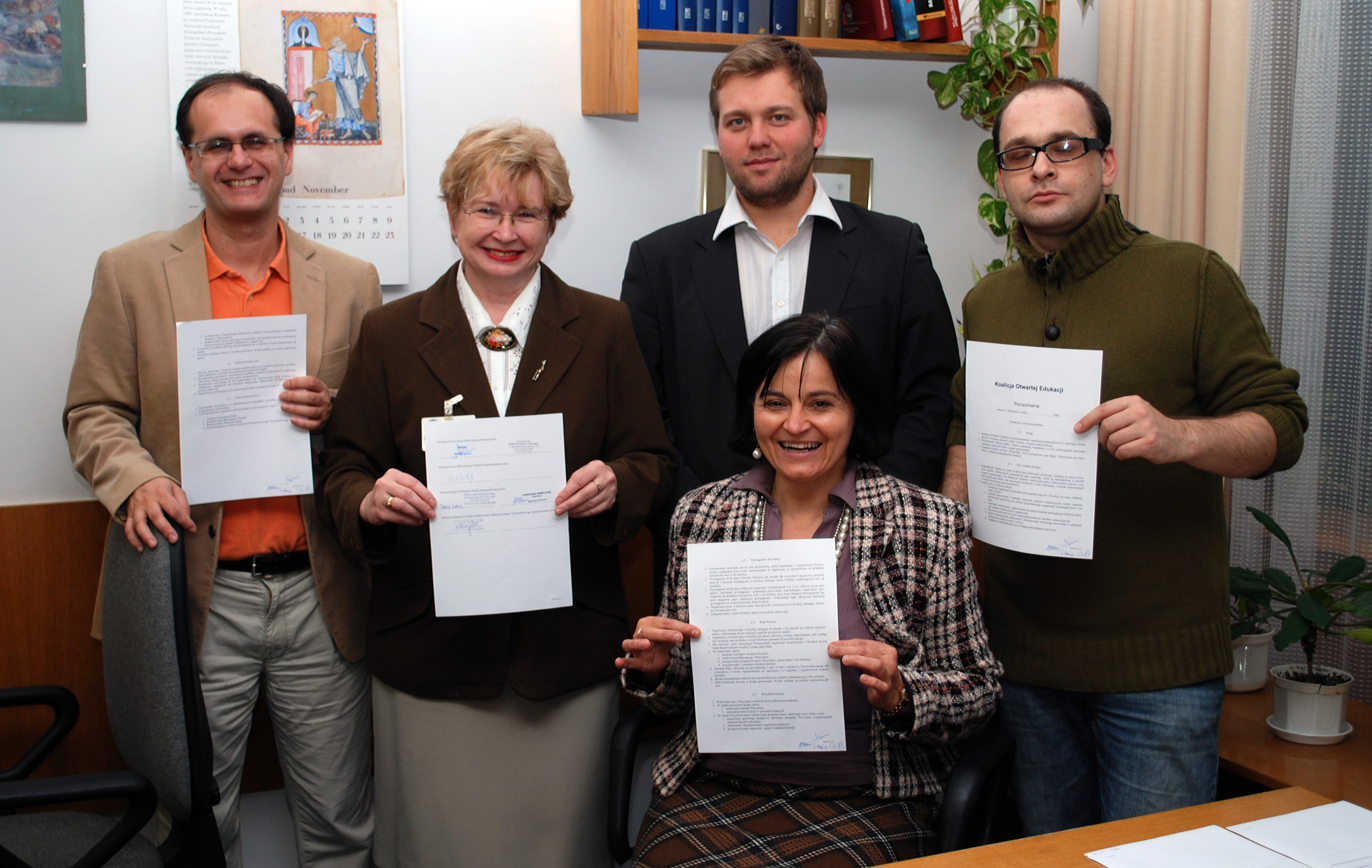
Coalition members presenting KOED founding act after signing

Coalition for Open Education (Koalicja Otwartej Edukacji, KOED) is a coalition of institutions supporting and developing Open Educational Resources (OER) in Poland. Coalition was formed on 27 November 2008 by Stowarzyszenie Bibliotekarzy Polskich, ICM UW/Creative Commons Polska, Fundacja Nowoczesna Polska and Wikimedia Polska.

The conference "Open Educational Resources in Poland", organized by KOED in the Polish Parliament on 23 April 2009 was the first major OER event of this kind. From 2009 Coalition is an organizer of Public Domain Day in Poland, event widely covered in mainstream media.

== See also ==
- Open access in Poland
