= Sandra and Woo =

German comedy webcomic

- Author: Oliver "Novil" Knörzer
- Illustrator: Puri "Powree" Andini
- Website: http://www.sandraandwoo.com/
- Current status/schedule: Hiatus
- Launch date: 19 October 2008
- End date: (original run) 26 November 2022
- Genre: Comedy
- Original language: English, German

Sandra and Woo (German: Sandra und Woo) is a comedy webcomic written by a German author, Oliver "Novil" Knörzer, and drawn by an Indonesian artist, Puri "Powree" Andini. It is published in English and German. The first strip was put online on 19 October 2008 and the black-and-white comic strip was updated twice a week after. The last regular strip before the current hiatus was posted on 26 November 2022. A new strip, reusing existing art, was posted on 12 August 2023.

== Timeline ==
From strip #307, published on 12 September 2011, to strip #398, published on 30 July 2012, the comic was colored by the American artist Lisa Moore. She also colored selected strips from the strip archive during this time. The 1000th Sandra and Woo strip was posted on 1 July 2018.

For the 500th strip, entitled The Book of Woo and published on 29 July 2013, Knörzer and Andini created four illustrated pages inspired by the Voynich manuscript. All four pages show strange illustrations next to a cipher text. The strip was mentioned in MTV Geek and discussed in the Cipher Mysteries blog of cryptology expert Nick Pelling as well as Klausis Krypto Kolumne of cryptology expert Klaus Schmeh. The Book of Woo was also discussed on several pages of Craig P. Bauer's book Unsolved! about the history of famous ciphers. As part of the lead-up to the 1000th strip, Knörzer posted the original English text on 28 June 2018. The crucial obfuscation step was the translation of the English plain text into the constructed language Toki Pona by Matthew Martin.

A Kickstarter campaign was announced on 7 November 2018 for a printed anthology of the first 1031 strips, Sandra and Woo: 10 Years, and a second book containing artwork based on the comic, The Art of Sandra and Woo. The Kickstarter campaign ran until 3 January 2019 and raised €49,220 from 959 backers. In total, 776 copies of the anthology and 585 copies of the art book were printed and shipped in 2019.

The webcomic started an abrupt hiatus on 8 July 2022. There was no comment from the author about the situation until 26 November 2022 when another strip was posted, saying that it was the last one drawn by Andini. In an announcement posted on 5 March 2023, Knörzer said that the comic is not finished, but will resume with a new artist at some point in the future.

== Characters ==
The main characters of the comic strip are the 13-year-old girl Sandra North and her pet raccoon Woo. Sandra lives together with her single father Richard in an unnamed town in the north of the United States. Woo is able to speak, but only talks with Sandra since he's afraid to end up in a laboratory otherwise. Woo is a quite mischievous raccoon, so Sandra occasionally gets in trouble as a result of Woo's misbehavior.

Sandra's boyfriend Cloud Williams and Sandra's best friend Larisa Korolev have appeared almost as often as Woo in the webcomic since 2010. Cloud is the son of two fanatic Final Fantasy fans, David and Ye Thuza, who named him after Final Fantasy VII’s hero Cloud Strife. They also have a younger daughter, named Yuna after the Final Fantasy X protagonist. Cloud gets trained in sword-fighting and combat by his Burmese mother Ye Thuza, who was a rebel in her home country before coming to America. Larisa is a free spirit who doesn’t think too much about the consequences of her actions. She’s a casual pyromaniac and the only thing she loves more than fire is probably smooching with boys. In strip #718 it was revealed that she was born with Wolfram syndrome, which means she has a lifespan of about 30 years, giving us some insight of her aggressive determination to live while she can.

Other recurring characters include Woo's love interest Lily, the fox Shadow and the red squirrel Sid, who live in the large forest near Sandra’s house. Shadow and Sid met as kits when they were raised by the same wildlife rehabber. As indicated by the webcomic's tagline, "a webcomic about friendship, life and the art of (not) eating squirrels", it is a running gag in the webcomic that Woo, Shadow and other carnivores regularly try to eat Sid, but fail in the end.

== Reception ==
Sandra and Woo received positive reviews from most critics. Brigid Alverson from Comic Book Resources noted that "it includes a bit of bad language and a few references to serious subjects, but the cute animals and the clean artwork have plenty of kid-appeal." In issue 06/2010 of the Russian game magazine Game Land, the reviewer pointed out that comic readers would enjoy the references to other comics found in Sandra and Woo. Jaron Hataway of The Dallas Morning News' Pop Culture Blog found that Andini's art style makes it easy to understand the course of action and that Knörzer understands the "interwoven feelings of tween-aged girls." Criticising that the dialog "can sometimes be a little off," he gave it a rating of 9/10 and concluded that "the characters are wonderfully crafted and the art is delightful." Other critics were reminded of Bill Watterson’s Calvin and Hobbes, which is also given as the main influence by the webcomic author, because of the similar style of humor.

Sandra and Woo was nominated three times for the category "Best Anthropomorphic Comic Strip" at the 2010, 2011, and 2012 Ursa Major Awards, for the category “Best Black and White Art” at The Webcomic List Awards 2010, and was given a Webcomic Beaky Award as one of the three best new webcomics of 2008. In March 2013, Sandra and Woo reached the final round of the ComicMix Webcomic Tournament 2013, a single-elimination tournament based on votes and donations between 128 of the most popular webcomics.

Sandra and Woo was also the topic of two journal articles by linguist Jun.-Prof. Dr. Ulrike Preußer from the University of Duisburg-Essen published in German teaching magazines. Taking an in-depth look at the German versions of the strips A Sly Raccoon and The Forbidden Fruit, Preußer discusses how teachers can use comic strips such as those to generate literary interest in grade schoolers.

The German version of the strip Test Of Friendship was included in Freiräume – Evangelisches Religionsbuch für Mittelschulen, a Protestant religious schoolbook for German middle schools.

Sandra and Woo was also featured in two scientific papers. Using artwork from various Sandra and Woo strips, the papers presented a new automatic algorithm for extracting properties of an individual artist's style and applying those properties to other drawings.

== Sandra and Woo in the Cursed Adventure ==
In summer 2012, the German PC game developer Feline Fuelled Games began the development of an adventure game called Sandra and Woo in the Cursed Adventure featuring all the main characters from Sandra and Woo. On 30 April 2015, the first screenshots of the game were uploaded to the webcomic's website. The game was eventually released on Steam on 5 May 2017 to mixed reviews from video game critics. In his review for Adventure Gamers (3.5/5 stars), Peter Mattsson was fond of the likeable characters and the interesting story, but criticized the design of some of the puzzles and minigames. Susanne Lang-Vorhofer from the German website Adventure Corner also liked the characters and the story, but had a very negative opinion about the German voice-over, giving the game a score of 68% in the end.

== Other comics ==
=== Gaia ===
Since 19 November 2011, the Sandra and Woo website also hosts Knörzer and Andini's fantasy webcomic Gaia, which follows the adventures of several graduates of an elite academy after a deadly attack during graduation ball. Gaia is based on a story which was originally developed by Feline Fuelled Games for a cancelled campaign mod for the PC game Neverwinter Nights 2. Gaia came to an end on 30 July 2021 after 950 published pages, including 12 cover pages. Until then it had been updated twice a week with full color pages in English and German.

Gaia received very positive reviews from most critics. El Santo, author of The Webcomic Overlook, found that "the ongoing character transformations from playful students to responsible adults are natural, believable, and never heavy-handed." Lauren Davis from io9 was also fond the characters: “From its very first pages, Gaia is a lively comic, both in its art and its characterizations. The characters are immediately warm and likable.”

On 14 April 2021, a Kickstarter campaign was announced for a printed anthology of Gaia and a second book containing a making-of and artwork based on the comic, Gaia: sic mundus creatus est. The two Sandra and Woo books were offered again as well. The Kickstarter campaign ran until 31 May 2021 and raised €130,110 from 1765 backers. This made the campaign for Gaia the 90th most funded campaign in Kickstarter's “Comics” category until that point in time.

Since 1 April 2023, a remastered version of Gaia is being rerun on the website at the rate of one page per day, accompanied by Knörzer's commentary from the making-of book.

=== The Adventurous Scarlet Carolus and the Machine of Eternal Summer ===
On 5 March 2023, Knörzer announced that he's working on a new science fantasy comic, to be called The Adventurous Scarlet Carolus and the Machine of Eternal Summer, or Scarlet for short.

On 29 January 2024, the first page of the new comic was published on the Sandra and Woo website. The comic is drawn by Finnish artist Elli Puukangas, who previously created the webcomic Tistow. Like Knörzer's previous two comics, Scarlet will be published in English and German.

Scarlet follows the adventures of the girl Scarlet Carolus who wants to turn the legendary Machine of Eternal Summer back on and thus save her dying world Lavarel from freezing. One of the main inspirations of the comic is Numenera, a science fantasy role-playing game set in the far distant future of Earth where technological artifacts have effects that are indistinguishable from magic. Apart from humans, the comic features anthropomorphic foxes and wolves.
