= Glest =

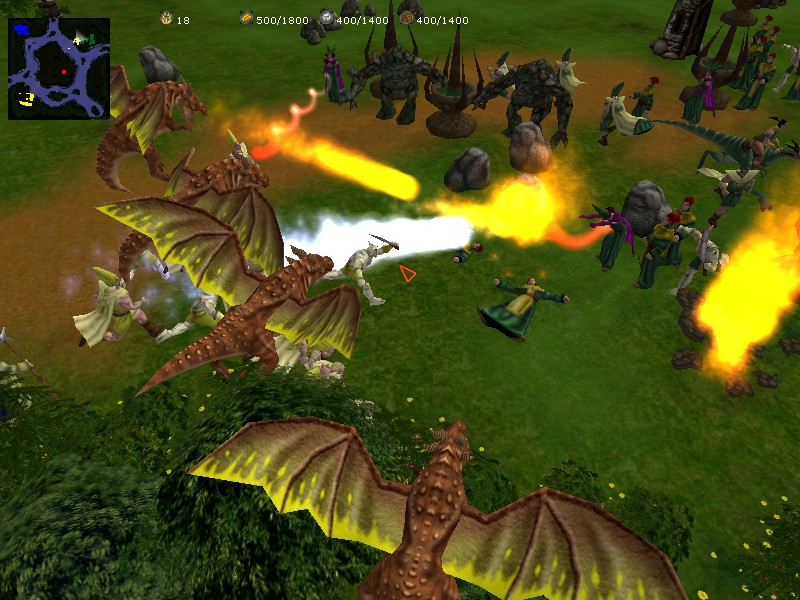
- In-game screenshot
- Developer: Glest Team
- Platforms: Microsoft Windows, Linux
- Release: December 25, 2004
- Genre: Real-time strategy
- Modes: Single-player, multiplayer

Glest is a free and open-source real-time strategy computer game from 2004. Glest is set in a medieval fantasy world with two factions, and was compared with Warcraft III and the Empire Earth series. The game received positive to mixed reviews from the press, has been downloaded over two million times, and spawned several derivative continuation projects which are under active development.

== Development ==
The game was started by a team based in Spain around 2004. Release of version 3.0 added online multiplayer LAN/Internet support. Glest is designed to be moddable, with game elements defined by editable XML files, and includes a map editor.

Since April 2009, development on the original game has ceased. However, two forks, MegaGlest and the Glest Advanced Engine (GAE) have continued developing the game and its engine further. While MegaGlest is focused on stable releases which provide reliable cross platform multi-player games and deliver new game content out of the box, GAE is primarily oriented towards improving the game engine and providing more options for full conversions, and is more experimental in nature.

In 2011 it was suggested that the two forks should merge but due to different philosophies and goals amongst the developers of both forks this effort was called off during the planning stage.

== Gameplay ==
Glest is set in a medieval fantasy world with two factions, named Magic and Tech, each with their own set of units, buildings and upgrades. The Tech faction uses traditional human warriors and has medieval mechanical devices in its arsenal, and are strong in melee combat. The Magic faction is designed for advanced players with most of their units morphed from or summoned by others. It lacks the hand-to-hand combat strength of the Tech faction but features more versatile units. Tilesets and maps are selected at the new game setup menu and determine the graphical nature of the Glest game world.

Because of the moddability of the engine, Glest can play games from a variety of player-created mods. These range from futuristic science fiction themes to dark, high fantasy settings.

== Reception ==
- Acid Play: Rating: 9.2 "A totally awesome 3D strategy game based in the magic forests during medieval times."
- CNET Download.com gave Glest v3.1 5 Stars (User Rating 4 out of 5 stars) and compared it to Warcraft III and the Empire Earth series in 2009:

"For a freeware game, Glest stands out at an astonishing level. A real-time strategy game in the vein of Warcraft III or the Empire Earth games, it asks players to create workers, harvest resources, construct buildings, produce military units, and ultimately destroy enemy bases. Though its technology isn't quite as deep as the commercial games, we were quite surprised to find very well-rendered 3D textures, good music, detailed models, and a well-developed game system. [...] Given the game's solid gameplay, good design, a small size, and, above all, a price tag of zero, we highly recommend Glest to anyone with a soft spot for real-time strategy games"

- The Linux Game Tome (happypenguin.org): Rating: 4.48 out of 5 stars
- Casualty gamer: In October 2008 reviewed version 3.1.2.
- About.com: Reviewed the game and highlighted the detailed 3D graphics in Glest, but criticized the underdeveloped gameplay and small number of maps in that version.

By July 2016 Glest had been downloaded on SourceForge alone over 2,300,000 times.

== See also ==
- List of open-source games
