= Socratic (Google) =

Educational technology company

- Company type: Subsidiary
- Website type: App, website
- Creators: Chris Pedregal, Shreyans Bhansali
- Industry: Education, Internet, Mobile Learning
- Parent: Google LLC
- Launched: 2013

Socratic is a discontinued education tech platform that used artificial intelligence to help students with their homework by providing educational resources like videos, definitions, Q&A, links and more.

Socratic was first launched as a web product in 2013 by Chris Pedregal and Shreyans Bhansali, in New York City, United States. They launched their app under the same name in 2016.

In March 2018, Socratic was acquired by Google for an undisclosed amount. The acquisition was made public in August 2019, when the Founder and CTO (now engineering manager) Shreyans Bhansali announced that the company had joined Google. The wake of news was accompanied by a redesigned iOS app .

Starting from August 2018, Socratic became no longer available for user contributions; past contributions were kept, but it was no longer possible to ask, answer, or edit questions. Its functionality was merged into Google Lens in 2025.

== Technology ==
The Socratic app utilized artificial intelligence to accurately predict which concepts will help a student solve their question. Over months, millions of real student questions were analyzed and classified. Then the app used that data to guess on future questions and provide specific education content.

The app worked by letting students take a photo of a homework question, a feature that was later added to Google Lens. Using Optical character recognition (OCR), the app was able to read their photo and classify it, using the technology described above. Students received various "cards" in the app with different learning resources, such as definitions, YouTube videos, Q&A, and original content and illustrations written by the Socratic.org web community.

In January 2017, Socratic added additional Math features to the app, including step-by-step equation help and graphs.

== Subjects ==
There were a total of four main groups of subjects on Socratic:

- Science
  - Anatomy and Physiology
  - Astronomy
  - Astrophysics
  - Biology
  - Chemistry
  - Earth Science
  - Environmental Science
  - Organic Chemistry
  - Physics
- Math
  - Algebra
  - Calculus
  - Geometry
  - Prealgebra
  - Precalculus
  - Statistics
  - Trigonometry
- Social Science
  - Psychology
- Humanities
  - English Grammar
  - U.S. History
  - World History

== See also ==
- Boundless
- Codecademy
- Khan Academy
- Quora
- ResearchGate
- Stack Exchange
- Brainly
