= Parody science =

Spoof of scientific writing or practice

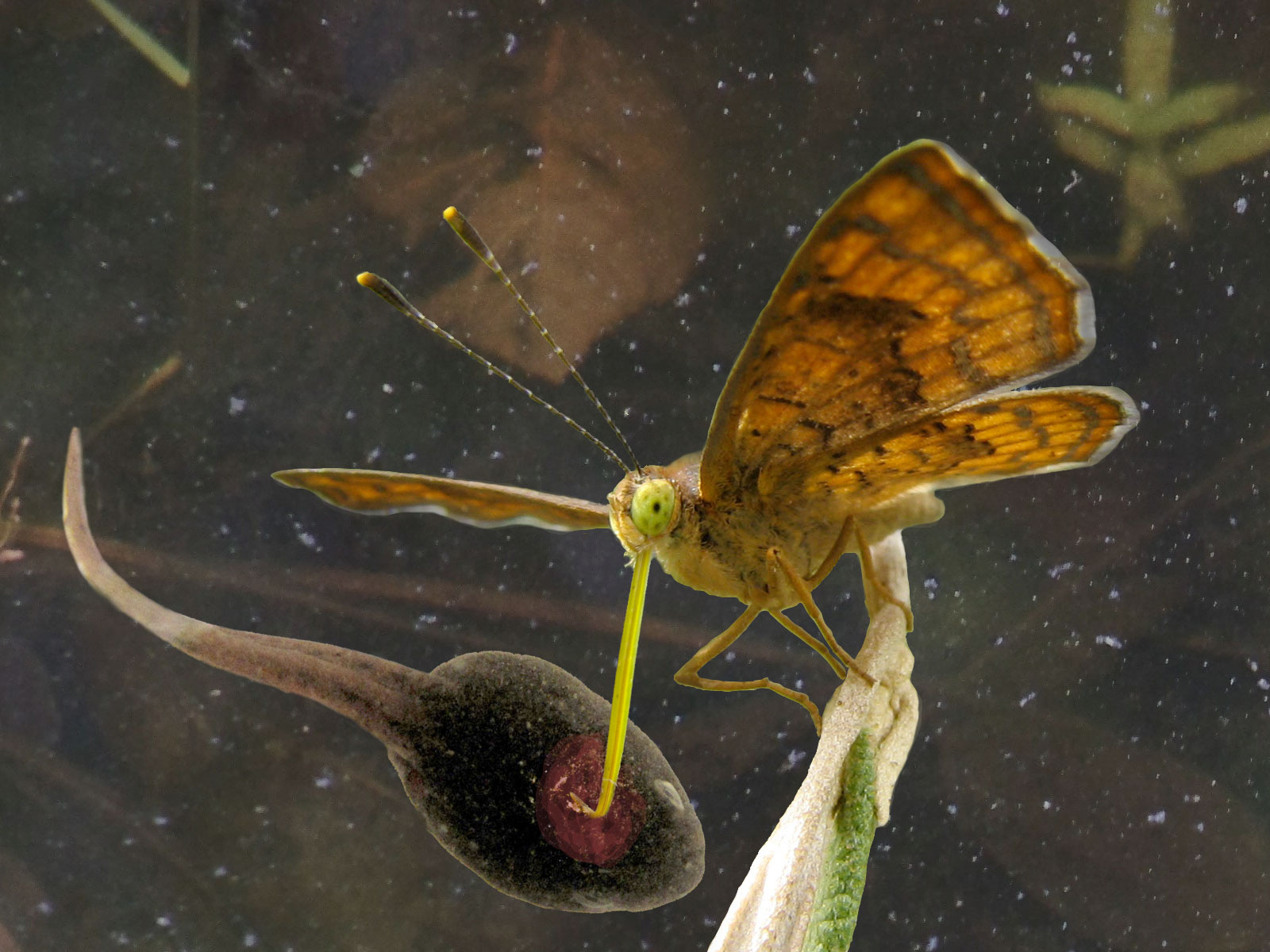
An April Fools joke in the form of science parody

Parody science, sometimes called spoof science, is the act of mocking science in a satirical way. Science can be parodied for a purpose, ranging from social commentary and making political points, to humor for its own sake.

Parody science is different from science humor or from real science that happens to be humorous, in that parody science has little or no basis in real science.

One of the forms of parody science are spoof scientific articles. Some can be seen as a subgenre of science fiction.

== List of parody science resources ==
- Journal of Irreproducible Results – Parody science journal since 1955.
- Science Made Stupid – 1985 parody science book by Tom Weller.
- Speculative Grammarian – "the premier scholarly journal featuring research in the neglected field of satirical linguistics".
- Dihydrogen monoxide parody, which exploits common fears about science to make people think that water is dangerous.
- Look Around You, a BBC scientific satire based on school science programmes from the '70s and '80s.
- Ask Dr. Science, a humorous radio and television program.
- Worm Runner's Digest. The satirical flip-side of the Journal of Biological Psychology, known for such articles as "A Stress Analysis of a Strapless Evening Gown."
- Sokal affair, physicist Alan Sokal's hoax paper entitled, "Transgressing the Boundaries: Towards a Transformative Hermeneutics of Quantum Gravity" was published in the journal Social Text.
- Experimental demonstration of the tomatotopic organization in the Soprano (Cantatrix sopranica L.), a fake research paper by the writer Georges Perec.
- Isaac Asimov wrote several spoof scientific papers about the fictitious chemical compound Thiotimoline.
- Proceedings of the Natural Institute of Science – Online-only journal that publishes both satirical and real articles in a scientific journal format.
- Body Ritual Among the Nacirema, a satire of social anthropology research by Horace Miner.
- The unsuccessful self-treatment of a case of "writer's block", an article with no content, but cited over 70 times
- Dyson sphere – hypothetical megastructure theorised by Freeman Dyson in Science in 1960. Later described by the author as a "little joke", with him remarking that "you get to be famous only for the things you don't think are serious".

== See also ==
- F.D.C. Willard – a cat cited as an author in scientific journals
- Mathematical joke
- Parody religion
- Pseudoscience
