= Bangladesh Fisheries Information Share Home =

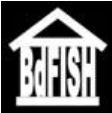

Content
- Description: A large and extensively accessed biological database about fishes of Bangladesh
- Data types captured: Comprehensive species data, including taxonomy, biometrics, behaviour, distribution, morphometrics, broodstock, spawning, nursery behaviour, prey and predators, geographical distribution, techniques for rearing, habitats and photos.
- Organisms: Fish species (finfish)

Contact
- Research center: Aquatic Biodiversity Lab. Department of Fisheries University of Rajshahi Bangladesh

Access
- Website: www.bdfish.org

Miscellaneous
- License: CC-BY-NC for data; various levels of licensing for media files (pictures, sounds, ...) to be checked case by case
- Data release frequency: Continuously updated
- Bookmarkable entities: Yes

Bangladesh Fisheries Information Share Home (BdFISH) is a global online database of information about fish species of Bangladesh. It is the largest and most extensively accessed online database on fishes of Bangladesh on the web. Over time it has "evolved into a dynamic and versatile ecological tool", widely cited in fisheries educational institutions of Bangladesh.

Bangladesh Fisheries Information Share Home provides comprehensive data, including information such as identification keys, broodstock, spawning, nursery behaviour, prey and predators, growth stages, geographical distribution, biometrics and morphology, behaviour and habitats, ecology, and population dynamics, as well as reproductive, metabolic, and genetic data on fishes of Bangladesh. It also includes information of specific interest to aquaculturists and techniques for rearing fish and other aquatic organisms of commercial importance in Bangladesh.

Bangladesh Fisheries Information Share Home included descriptions in two languages and aims to include all the key data on fishes of Bangladesh, with an emphasis on standardizing the data, making it easy to extract and combine data with other data, and offering powerful presentation tools.

== History ==
The origins of the Bangladesh Fisheries Information Share Home go back to the 2000s, when the fisheries scientist ABM Mohsin and his students Shams Galib and Md Mehedi Hasan found themselves struggling to collect data about the fishes (ornamental, exotic, and native species) of Bangladesh. It can be difficult for fisheries, aquaculture and hatchery scientists, and managers to get the information they need on the species that concern them, because the relevant facts can be scattered and buried across numerous journal articles, reports, newsletters, and other sources. It can be particularly difficult for people in developing countries who need such information. An answer to this situation is to consolidate all the available information, drawn from the global sources, into an easily accessed database.

Bangladesh Fisheries Information Share Home was subsequently extended to cover all finfish and other aquatic organisms of Bangladesh, and was launched on the eeb in late 2007. It is now the most accessed online database for fishes of Bangladesh.

== Current organization ==
As awareness of Bangladesh Fisheries Information Share Home has grown among fish specialists, it has attracted the related students, teachers, and fishery professionals of Bangladesh. Since 2007, Bangladesh Fisheries Information Share Home has been managed by a team 'BdFISH Team' and functions as the coordinating body.

== Journal of Fisheries ==
In 2013, BdFISH launched its maiden academic journal entitled Journal of Fisheries (ISSN 2311-729X, print; and 2311–3111, online), edited by MN Islam of the University of Rajshahi. It publishes peer-reviewed original articles, short communications, and reviews dealing with every aspect of fisheries science at no cost. The coverage ranges from molecular-level mechanistic studies to investigations at the whole ecosystem scale, including aquatic ecology. The Journal of Fisheries publishes articles not only focusing on research across disciplinary and environmental boundaries, but also studies highlighting interactions with aquatic habitats and biota within the habitats, at both inter- and/or intra–levels. The journal is indexed in the Core Collections of the Web of Science database (Emerging Sources Citation Index), Directory of Open Access Journals (DOAJ), Chemical Abstracts Service (CAS), Google Scholar, and so on.
