= The Honour of the Knights =

2009 novel by Stephen J. Sweeney

- Author: Stephen J Sweeney
- Language: English
- Series: The Battle for the Solar System
- Genre: Science fiction
- Publisher: Self-published
- Publication date: 24 January 2009 (US)
- Publication place: United Kingdom
- Media type: Print (Paperback)
- Pages: 348
- ISBN: 978-0-9558561-0-5 (US)
- Followed by: The Third Side
- Website: battleforthesolarsystem.com

The Honour of the Knights is a science fiction novel written by Stephen J Sweeney in 2008 and released as paperback and ebook editions in 2009. The novel is available as open content ebook under a Creative Commons license (CC BY-NC-SA). A Spanish translation is also available.

The story is set in the year 2617 and revolves around five starfighter pilots – mainly one named Simon Dodds – who begin to discover that an Imperial nation's purported civil war and the disappearance of a massive battleship are all lies, created by the Confederacy to keep the truth away from as many people as possible. The novel shows the story from a number of different points of view, from the pilots themselves, to naval top brass, and to spies and agents who are working to keep the truth contained.

== Plot summary ==
In 2617AD, the remains of Mitikas Imperium's naval forces are making a last stand against an unstoppable enemy force known only as the Pandorans who have driven them to the brink of destruction. A pilot by the name of Jacques Chalmers witnesses the final destruction of their forces at the hands of Admiral Zackaria before his own death.

The story moves to Earth, on the other side of the galaxy, where Simon Dodds is awoken by a man named Patrick Dean who has mysteriously found his way to his parents' house. Though Dodds attempts to save his life, the man has suffered fatal gunshot wounds and dies of respiratory failure. The Confederation Stellar Navy arrive the next morning to take Dean's body away, telling Dodds to deny his existence. Two weeks later they request he return to naval service.

Meeting Admiral Turner, Commodore Parks and Commodore Hawke, Dodds is once again reminded to deny Dean's existence and is then told that he is to spend the next 3 weeks participating in the ATAF project, a newly developed starfighter with superior capabilities to anything else in military history. Dodds is reunited with his old teammates (the White Knights), discovering during his absence that the Confederacy's flagship, a battleship known as Dragon, has been hijacked and has not been seen for nearly 6 months. Commodore Hawke was the only surviving crew member. He has, however, been unable to accurately describe what happened to him during that time.

Whilst attending a presentation on the ATAF, Dodds begins to question the starfighter the navy has constructed, feeling the design is not an evolutionary step, but more of a reaction to something more serious. His teammates, however, dismiss his concern. The White Knights spend several weeks participating in simulated tests involving the ATAFs, bidding to become the real test pilots. They are, however, outperformed by another team (The Red Devils) and are transferred to the Confederacy border system of Temper, stationed at a planet called Spirit.

Whilst patrolling the system, the group witness a research vessel come under attack by a raiding party. A single raider escapes with a dump of the vessel's databanks and flees into Imperial space. Later, whilst drinking in the naval base's Officer's Club, Dodds hears a series of rumours that explain that the purported Imperial civil war is a fabrication and the empire was wiped out months ago. The rumourmonger tells him that all that is left are a number of refugees and that Dragon, with its 50,000 strong crew, couldn't have been hijacked by anything more than a sizeable opponent. Dodds, Enrique and Chaz discuss the rumours and continue to drink neat whiskey for most of the night, becoming more and more drunk as the evening goes on. The next day the naval base is awoken to the news that Dragon has been located and the CSN plan to intercept and take back the vessel. A secondary goal of the operation is to also capture and arrest Admiral Zackaria, for his believed part in the ongoing trouble in Imperial space and the theft of the battleship. Although they are at first assigned to take part in the offensive run against enemy targets, the White Knights are relegated to secondary defence after Commodore Parks discovers that Dodds and Enrique are still drunk.

The CSN sends its three major carriers, Griffin, Ifrit and Leviathan to Aster to intercept and bring Dragon home, commanded by Commodore Parks, Commodore Hawke, and Captain Meyers respectively. The start of the operation is disastrous, with Dragon's operators luring the allied forces into a false sense of security by complying with a remote shutdown request and then eliminating all the approaching vessels. It then turns its main cannon on UNF Grendel, destroying it with a single shot. With the allied forces completely outmatched by the enemy starfighter pilots, who many begin to believe are not being piloted by Imperials, Parks orders an immediate retreat. Before they can do so, however, they are attacked by enemy reinforcements and Griffin is left dead in the water. With the original pilots dead and with no means to launch fighters, the White Knights are left to pilot the ATAFs and use them to drive back the enemy forces. Dodds once again begins to question the power of the starfighter, feeling that something is not right about it.

After the enemy forces have fled the system, the allies attempt to return home. Griffin, however, suffers a mis-jump and becomes stranded in Imperial space. Whilst the carrier's crew effect repairs and await rescue, Admiral Turner contacts Parks and tells him that the raider who stole the ATAF plans is currently in the same star system attempting to sell them on. He orders Parks to send the White Knights to Arlos starport to meet a government agent (Clare Barber) who has been tasked with retrieving them.

Arriving at the starport, Dodds comes to realise that the rumours he had heard the previous nights are, in fact, 100% true and the starport is full of refugees. After hours of searching the starport the team discovers that Barber is dead and they head to the starport's hospital's morgue to search her for the stolen data card. It transpires that the woman has swallowed the card, leaving the team with no choice but to cut her open to get it. As they do so, a detachment of Pandoran soldiers arrive at the starport and begin to slaughter the refugees. The Knights attempt to fight one of the soldiers who has come to the morgue, searching for survivors, but discover the man is not only exceptionally strong, but also possesses incredible healing abilities. The team eventually manage to defeat the soldier and then fight their way out of the starport, heading back to Griffin.

Arriving in the vicinity of the carrier, they discover that it has come under attack by Commodore Hawke, who has turned control of CSN Ifrit over to Admiral Zackaria, in service of the Imperial Senate and "The Mission". The Knights once again fight back against the enemy forces, before Dodds attacks Ifrit directly and spaces Hawke and Zackaria. Following this, the enemy forces cease their attack on Griffin and leave.

The Knights return home to a heroes' welcome, but are left with a great number of questions on their minds.

== History ==
The science fiction novel The Honour of the Knights was written by Stephen J Sweeney, after losing his job during the collapse of Lehman Brothers investment bank in 2008. Sweeney referenced in The Honour of the Knights his earlier work, the video game Project: Starfighter, with shared naming of some star systems. The novel is the first part of Sweeney's Battle for the Solar System trilogy.

The Honour of the Knights was first released on 24 January 2009 (ISBN 9780955856105) as Softcover, on 1 February 2010 an e-Book (ISBN 9780955856198) release followed. Sweeney briefly appeared in national press in September 2009, including The London Evening Standard, BBC News, and Sky News for what was considered to be one of the more interesting career shifts after the fall of the bank.

=== Licensing of the first edition ===
On 1 February 2010, Sweeney began serializing the First Edition of the book under a Creative Commons license, specifically Attribution-Noncommercial-No Derivatives (CC BY-NC-ND). Each chapter of the book would be posted online on subsequent Fridays, starting on 5 February. The novel contains 27 chapters, plus prologue, and completed its serialization on 16 July 2010. On 16 August 2014, Sweeney updated the license of the First Edition to a ShareALike license (CC BY-NC-SA), allowing derivative works to be made for non-commercial purposes.

=== Sequels ===
Sweeney wrote two further novels to complete the trilogy, The Third Side (2010), and The Attribute of the Strong (2012). The books form the middle and end of the complete Battle for the Solar System story, which began with The Honour of the Knights.

=== Second edition ===
In 2011, the author reworked significantly The Honour of the Knights in a Second Edition release, to make it more consistent with the two further books in the trilogy. The second edition is slightly longer than the First Edition and was not released under a CC license.

=== Video game ===
In 2016, Sweeney also created an open-source video game titled The Pandoran War, set between the events of the second and third book. The source code is licensed under the GPL, while the assets are available under a mixture of Creative Commons licenses, ranging from CC-0 to CC BY-NC-SA. Due to the source code and assets free availability the game was ported to other platforms like the Linux based OpenPandora.

== Reception ==
In their review, The SF Crowsnest described the book as "a tightly plotted action-adventure yarn with a good mix of likeable, interesting and nasty characters."
