= MegaGlest =

2010 open source video game

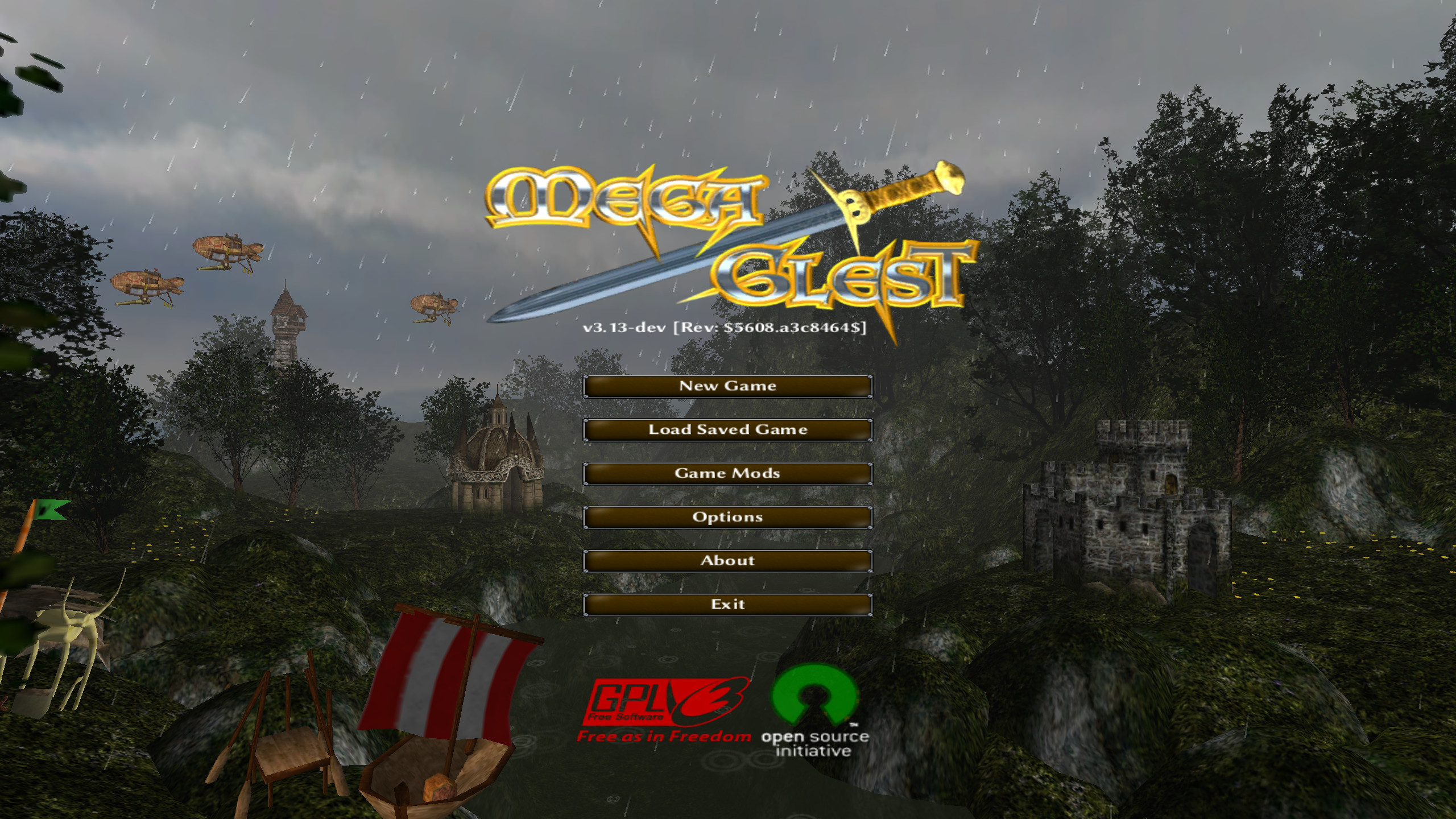
- The main menu screen of MegaGlest
- Developer: MegaGlest Team
- Engine: MegaGlest Engine
- Platforms: Linux, FreeBSD, Windows, OS X (Cross-platform)
- Release: WW: January 6, 2010; WW: March 9, 2017; (stable version 3.13.0)
- Genre: Real-time strategy
- Modes: Single player, Multiplayer

MegaGlest is a free and open source real-time strategy computer game in a fantasy world, mixing elements of re-imagined past civilizations, magic and steampunk. It is an actively developed fork of the 2004 game Glest, which is no longer under development.

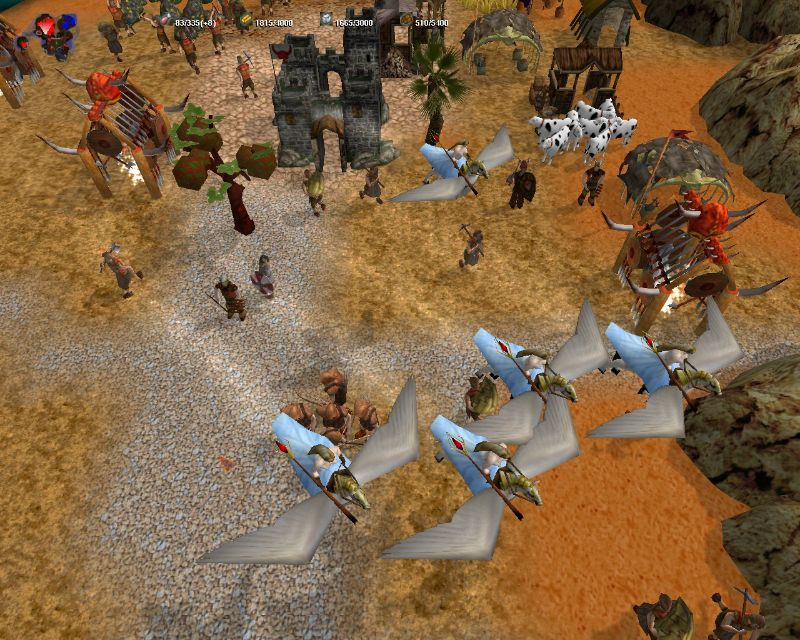
In-game screenshot

== Gameplay ==
MegaGlest is set in a fantasy world with seven factions: Magic, Tech, Indians, Egypt, Norsemen, Persian and Romans, which together form the Megapack. Each come with their own set of units, buildings and upgrades, advantages and disadvantages, which allows for variation in strategy while keeping a balanced gameplay. For example, the Tech faction uses traditional human warriors and has medieval mechanical devices in its arsenal, and are strong in melee combat while the Magic faction is designed for more advanced players with most of their units morphed from or summoned by others. Magic lacks the hand-to-hand combat strength of the Tech faction but features more versatile units. Tilesets are selected at the new game setup menu and determine the graphical nature of the MegaGlest game world. MegaGlest provides cross-platform online multiplayer LAN/Internet support.

Because of the modability of the engine, MegaGlest can play games from a variety of player-created mods and total conversions, spanning very different themes. The Japanese mod is an artistic mod with units and buildings inspired by historic Japanese warfare. Prax is another fantasy-themed tech tree which bears some similarities to MegaGlest's Magic and Tech factions but improves upon them, bearing both units and structures with very different properties and making use of newer engine features. The Military Glest and Enemies and Allies mods have a contemporary warfare theme and the Vbros Mods have a variety of factions; British, Western, Pirates, Canadians, Crusaders, Dark Knights, USA, Moon, Chess, Penguins, and much more.

== Game engine ==
While the term MegaGlest is usually used to refer to the complete game, the game engine, referred to as MegaGlest Engine, may also be used to create separate games. At this time, there is one released game which is built on the MegaGlest Engine: Annex - Conquer the World, another free and open source real-time strategy game, has a futuristic scenery with Manga elements, vehicle and hero units, and is therefore quite different from MegaGlest. Two more games are under development, planning to combine the open source engine with proprietary assets.

== Development ==
MegaGlest, a cross-platform game, is a continuation of real-time classic Glest, which has not been developed since April 2009. The MegaGlest game intends to continue in Glest's spirit and with similar gameplay, while improving existing features and adding more functionality, and therefore continues to use the Glest versioning scheme. The MegaGlest engine is designed to be moddable, with game elements defined by editable XML files. While a map editor and a model viewer are included, additional game assets can also be developed using separate open source applications (such as Blender) and are stored in open and documented formats (PNG, JPEG, Ogg) and the software's own G3D Glest model file format.

MegaGlest focuses on stable releases which provide reliable cross platform multi-player games while implementing new features and delivering new game content. The engine is continuously improved but this is of secondary exiguity after stability. Another Glest fork, GAE, was primarily oriented towards extending the game engine and providing more options for full conversions, and was more experimental in nature. In 2011 it was suggested that the two forks should merge, but due to different philosophies and goals amongst the developers of both forks this effort was called off during the planning stage.

Hosted originally on SourceForge, in 2013 the project migrated to GitHub.

== Reception ==
MegaGlest was positively reviewed by several gaming sites, and downloaded 300,000 times alone from SourceForge between 2010 and 2016.

- TuxArena.com: Except for the game saving issue, MegaGlest has everything you would expect from a 3D RTS. (MegaGlest 3.6.0)
- Softsea.com: Rating: 5 of 5 stars (as of November 2012)
- SourceForge: User Rating: 98% recommended (as of February 2013).
- FreewareFiles.com: Editors Pick, User Rating: 4.74 of 5.00 stars (as of February 2013).
- Linux Games DB: User Rating: 8.1 of 10 (as of February 2013).
- Softpedia.com: User Rating: 4.9 of 5.0 stars (as of February 2013).
- MacGameScout: User Rating: 4.9 of 5.0 stars (as of February 2013).
- PenguSpy.com: User Rating: 9.53 of 10.00 stars (as of February 2013).

A golem.de review in 2010 was favorable. In 2012 a Free software magazine review called the game "a fantastic, free software strategy 3D game".

== See also ==
- List of open source games
