= Open access in Poland =

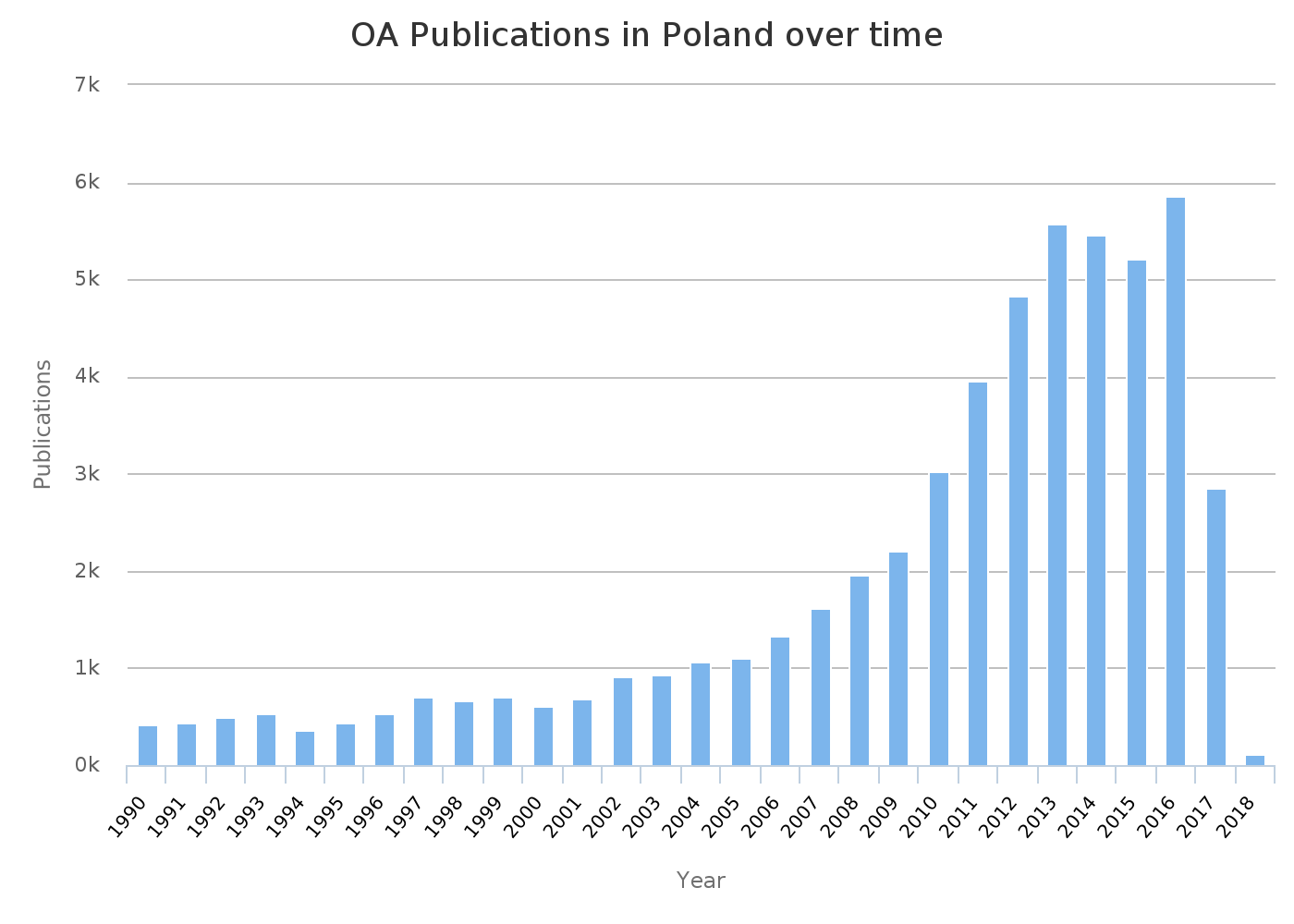
Growth of open access publications in Poland, 1990-2018

Open access scholarly communication of Poland can be searched via the "CeON Aggregator" of the University of Warsaw Interdisciplinary Centre for Mathematical and Computational Modelling's Centre for Open Science.

== Repositories ==
As of April 2025, the UK-based Directory of Open Access Repositories lists 152 repositories in Poland. However, according to the OpenAIRE project, "the majority of these are digital libraries, providing access to the digitized content of library collections, not functioning as repositories open to authors for the deposition of their own work." University of Lodz Repository and Adam Mickiewicz University Repository maintain the largest number of digital assets. The Warsaw Public Library runs the Mazowiecka Biblioteka Cyfrowa digital library, established in 2011.

== See also ==
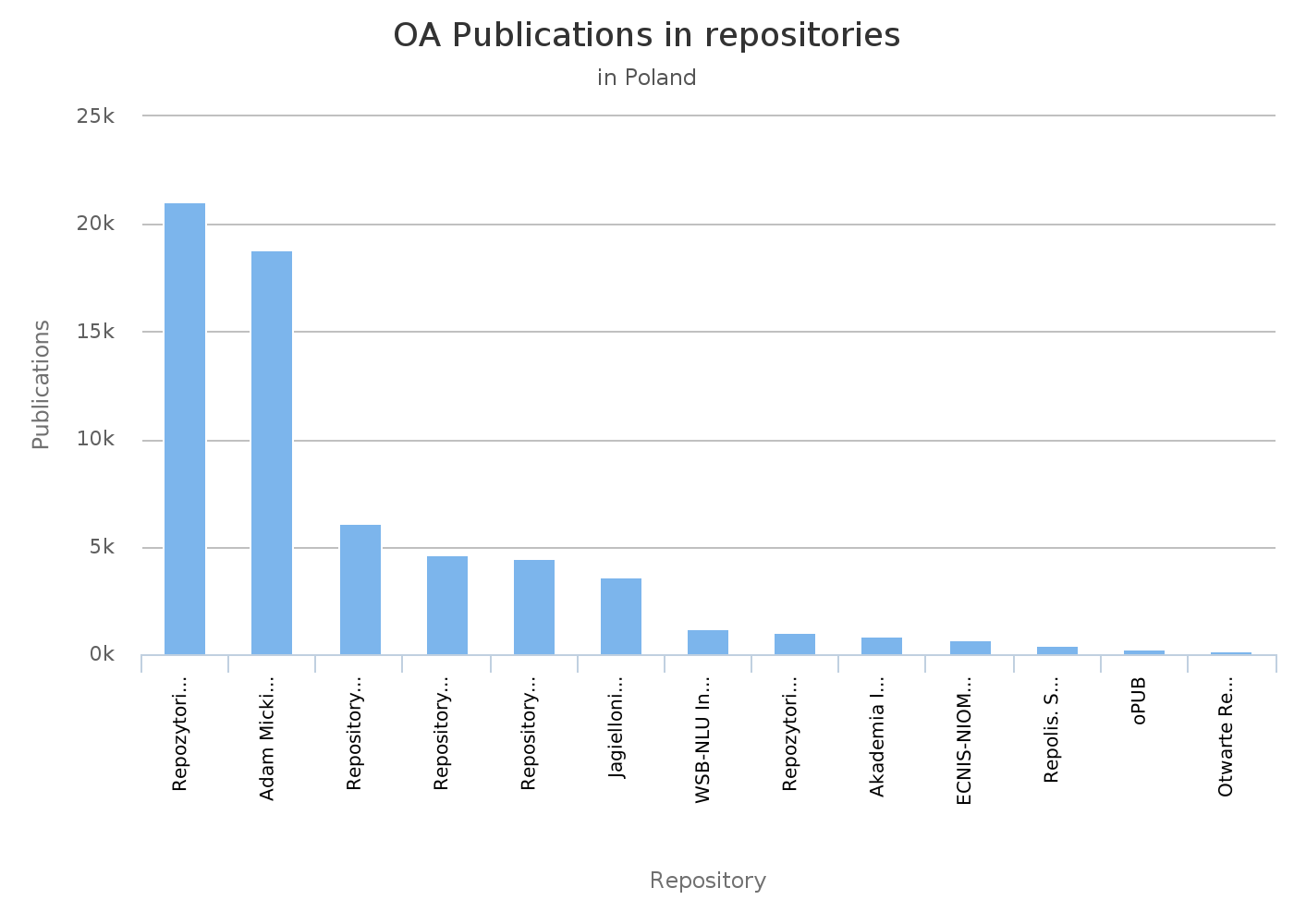
Number of open access publications in various Polish repositories, 2018

- Koalicja Otwartej Edukacji (Open Education Coalition), est. 2008
- Internet in Poland
- Education in Poland
- List of libraries in Poland
- Media of Poland
- Copyright law of Poland
- Open access in other countries
