= Speculative Grammarian =

Satirical linguistics journal

- Editor: Trey Jones
- Categories: Satirical linguistics
- Publisher: Speculative Grammarian
- First issue: 1988
- Country: United States
- Website: specgram.com
- ISSN: 1938-0720
- OCLC: 227210202

Speculative Grammarian (often referred to as SpecGram) is the self-described "premier scholarly journal featuring research in the neglected field of satirical linguistics". It is a parody science journal, similar in nature to the Annals of Improbable Research or the Journal of Irreproducible Results, but with content focusing on linguistics and closely related fields. It has also been compared to The Onion, but "for linguists."

== Content and style ==
The journal includes humorous articles often written in an exaggerated scholarly tone. Also regularly featured are poetry, cartoons, puzzles (including crosswords, and several other puzzle types adapted to have linguistic content), and parodies of book reviews, book advertisements, calls for papers, and other scholarly announcements.

Many papers properly apply serious linguistic concepts to absurd or inappropriate topics. Others provide linguistic analysis of absurd and fabricated language data, or provide a perverse analysis of real, though often severely and selectively limited, data. Still others directly parody linguistics or linguists themselves.

== Publication history ==
Based on the online SpecGram archives, the journal has been published sporadically under several names (Psammeticus Quarterly, Babel, and The Journal of the Linguistic Society of South-Central New Caledonia) since 1988, with consecutive issues being anywhere from one month to six years apart. From 2004 to 2006, the journal was published more consistently on a quarterly basis. In 2007, the journal was published bimonthly, and from the summer of 2008 through 2021, it was published monthly. Since 2022, the journal has been published quarterly. The journal was first edited by Tim Pulju and Keith Slater (now Executive Editor), and is currently edited by Trey Jones (now Editor-in-Chief).

=== Fictional history ===
One of the conceits of the journal is that it has existed in one form or another, and has wielded great influence in world events, for hundreds of years (including implications of competing with the Illuminati). This fictional history ("much of this rich and varied history is concocted ad lib and ad hoc") is occasionally revealed in pieces in Letters from the Editor. The first installment claims the journal was "founded by Petrus Hispanus, one of the original speculative grammarians, in 1276". Later installments trace the inconsistent and fantastical history through the present day. In June 2009, the fictional origin of the journal was pushed back almost four centuries, when the journal had a different name: "Íslensk Tölvumálvísindi ['Icelandic Computational Linguistics'] was founded in Reykjavík in 881 by Ingólfr Arnarson".

The first issue available in the archives bearing the Speculative Grammarian name is Vol. CXLVII, No. 1 from January 1993. However, the "Letter from the Managing Editor" for that issue makes it clear that, despite the assumption of a long previous history, SpecGram is a continuation of the previously titled Journal of the Linguistic Society of South-Central New Caledonia (the last issue of which was sub-titled Langue du Monde).

== Other satirical linguistics materials ==
The journal has republished a number of satirical linguistics works, some of which are available elsewhere on the Internet, some previously not, to bring them to a wider audience. The more notable collections include the works of Metalleus, which were incorporated into the regular issues from 2005 to 2008, and Lingua Pranca and Son of Lingua Pranca, which were originally published separately.

=== Metalleus ===
Linguist Ken Miner has written many popular satirical linguistics pieces over the years in the Usenet group sci.lang, under the pen-name Metalleus. Speculative Grammarian republished these, one per issue, from October 2005 through March 2008.

=== Lingua Pranca ===
Over the course of 2006, the journal converted an older satirical linguistics anthology, Lingua Pranca (1978), to an electronic format, so that it would be available to a wider audience. Over the course of 2007, the sequel, Son of Lingua Pranca (1979), was digitized.

Lingua Pranca includes humorous pieces by several linguists who, 30 years later, had gone on to become well known in the field, including Bernard Comrie, Elan Dresher, Norbert Hornstein, D. Terence Langendoen, James D. McCawley, Ken Miner, Robert L. Rankin, and Leonard Talmy.

In October 2009, a third anthology, Collateral Descendant of Lingua Pranca, was released which featured articles from "a number of new contributors," and "several veterans from Lingua Pranca and Son". The new articles are similar in tone and style to those in the original anthologies, and many make reference to the original articles.

=== Book ===
The 2013 book The Speculative Grammarian Essential Guide to Linguistics is a collection of writings from SpecGram.
