= Sanctuary (2009 film) =

- Directed by: Michela Ledwidge
- Cinematography: 35mm
- Release date: 2009
- Running time: approx. 10 min.
- Countries: United Kingdom; Australia
- Language: English

Sanctuary is a re-mixable science fiction film. In 2005, it became the first production to sign professional union actors to Creative Commons licensing terms. It is a superhero story set in Head Bin, a fictional universe. Sanctuary is also a pilot for a multi-player feature film and an open interactive story format, the RIG, being developed by MOD Films in London.

The film was completed in 2009. Most production assets, including principal photography shot on 35mm film and digitalised, have been cleared for free-for-non-commercial use.

== Awards ==
- Sydney Film Festival Innovation Award (2009)
- NESTA Inventions awarded to Michela Ledwidge of MOD (May 2004)
