= Proceedings of the Natural Institute of Science =

Semi-satirical scientific journal

- Discipline: Scientific satire
- Language: English
- Edited by: Matt J. Michel

Publication details
- History: Established in 2014
- Publisher: Natural Institute of Science (United States)
- Frequency: Irregular
- Open access: Yes

Standard abbreviations
- ISO 4: Proc. Nat. Inst. Sci.

Links
- Journal homepage

The Proceedings of the Natural Institute of Science (or PNIS) is a semi-satirical parody of a scientific journal that publishes articles in three categories: SOFD (Satirical or Fake Data), HARD (Honest And Reliable Data), and editorials. It was established in 2014 and the editor-in-chief is Matt J. Michel. The journal's editors have stated to Vox that articles published in PNIS-HARD are not peer-reviewed. However, they also maintained that the data in all such articles are entirely authentic.
