= Interdisciplinary Centre for Mathematical and Computational Modelling =

Supercomputing and research data centre

- Interdyscyplinarne Centrum Modelowania Matematycznego i Komputerowego
- Type: Research centre
- Established: 1993
- Affiliations: University of Warsaw
- Director: Marek Michalewicz
- Location: Warsaw, Poland; 52°11′32″N 21°01′19″E
- Website: icmmeteo.pl

Interdisciplinary Centre for Mathematical and Computational Modelling (ICM) is a supercomputing and research data centre at the University of Warsaw in Poland.

== See also ==
- Open access in Poland
