= List of open-source films =

For more information on the use of the term open source in connection with films, see Open source film.

== Published films ==
Title	Released	Genre	Country	Language	Length	CC license	Sources available?	Open source movie?	Commercial reuse?	Notes
The Draughtsmen Clash	1996		Democratic Republic of the Congo		40 minutes	CC BY-SA				
The Good Girl	2004	Pornography	Spain	English	21 minutes				No	
Elephants Dream	March 2006	Animation	Netherlands	English	9 minutes	by 2.5	Yes	Yes	Yes	First open-source movie, created with Blender open-source software
Juju Factory	2007		Democratic Republic of the Congo		97 minutes	CC BY-SA				
Big Buck Bunny	August 2008	Animation	Netherlands		10 minutes	by 3.0	Yes	Yes	Yes	Created with Blender
BloodSpell	December 2008	Fantasy	Scotland		90 minutes					
Sanctuary	2009	Science fiction	Australia/United Kingdom	English	approx. 10 minutes	by-nc-sa 2.5	No	No		
Sita Sings the Blues	March 2009	Animation	United States	English	82 minutes	CC0 1.0	Yes	No	Yes	Solo project by Nina Paley. Later released into the public domain in 2011.
Seder-Masochism	June 2018	Animation	United States	English	78 minutes	CC0 1.0	Yes	No	Yes	Solo project by Nina Paley. Later released into the public domain in 2019.
Valkaama	January 2010	Drama	Germany, Poland	English	93 minutes	CC BY SA 3.0	Yes	Yes	Yes	
Sintel	2010	Animation	Netherlands	English	14 minutes	CC BY 3.0	Yes	Yes	Yes	Created with Blender
Tears of Steel	2012	Science Fiction	Netherlands	English	12 minutes	CC BY 3.0	Yes	Yes	Yes	Created with Blender
Decay	November 2012	Horror	United Kingdom	English	75 minutes		Yes			
TPB AFK	February 2013	Documentary	Sweden	Swedish English	82 minutes	CC BY-NC-SA 3.0	Yes	Yes	No	Documentary about the founders of The Pirate Bay and the Pirate Bay trial.
Caminandes 1: Llama Drama	2013	Animation	Netherlands		2 minutes					Created with Blender
Caminandes 2: Gran Dillama	2013	Animation	Netherlands		2 minutes					Created with Blender
Cosmos Laundromat	August 2015	Animation	Netherlands	English	12 minutes		Yes			Created with Blender
Caminandes 3: Llamigos	2016	Animation	Netherlands		3 minutes					Created with Blender
Spring	2019	Animation	Netherlands		8 minutes	CC BY 4.0	Yes	Yes	Yes	Created with Blender
Sprite Fright	October 2021	Animation, Horror, Comedy			10 minutes					Created with Blender

== Upcoming films ==
Title	Type	Planned release	CC license	Sources available?	Open source movie?	Notes
A Swarm of Angels	feature film	not yet	by-nc-sa 2.0	intended	partially	Collaborative project. Status: Pre-production.
