= Open-source film =

Film released under a permissive license

Open-source films (also known as open-content films and free-content films) are films which are produced and distributed by using free and open-source and open content methodologies. Their source files are freely available and the licenses used meet the demands of the Open Source Initiative (OSI) in terms of freedom.

== Definition ==
A definition of an open-source film is based on the OSI's open-source software definition and the definition of free cultural licenses. This definition can be applied to films where:

1. The license of the movie is approved for free cultural works. Specifically this is true for the Creative Commons licenses BY and BY-SA.
2. The materials used in the movie (sources) are also available under a license which is approved for free cultural works.
3. The movie and its sources are made publicly available via an online download or by other means that are either free or with a cost that covers reasonable reproduction expenses only.
4. The sources should be viewable and editable with free/open-source software. If this is not the case they must be convertible into such a format by using free/open-source software. The same applies to the movie itself.
5. It should be possible to re-create or re-assemble the movie using the source materials.

Films or film projects which do not meet these criteria are either not open source or partially open source.

== List of open-source films ==
Name	Type	Released	CC License	Sources	Comment
Dancing to Architecture – a motion picture about TINA	Documentary	2002	BY 2.5 AU	link	Collaborative production. Vital Focus 2002.
Route 66 - An American Nightmare	Road movie / Gonzo-documentary	12/2004	BY-SA 3.0	link streaming torrent	Became popular as Germany's first open-source film. The license changed to CC BY-SA in July 2009.
Elephants Dream	Animated short	04/2006	BY 2.5	link	Created with the Blender open-source software.
Stray Cinema	Short film/ Remix project	2006	BY 3.0	link	Collaborative project
.re_potemkin	Contemporary art project	2007	none/copyleft	link	A remake of Sergei Eisenstein's "Battleship Potemkin" using crowdsourcing / peer production method.
Big Buck Bunny	Animated short	08/2008	BY 3.0	link	Created with the Blender Open Source Software.
Jathia's Wager	Short film	02/2009	BY-SA 3.0	link	Sources only consist of the movie without music score.
Sita Sings the Blues	Animated musical of the Indian epic the Ramayana	2009	CC0 1.0	link	
Valkaama	Feature film	01/2010	BY-SA 3.0	homepage torrent	Collaborative project. HD download available (720p and 1080p)
The Digital Tipping Point	Documentary	in production	BY-SA	link	Collaborative project.
Sintel	Animated short	10/2010	BY 3.0	link	Created with the Blender Open Source Software.
La Chute d'une plume (pèse plus que ta pudeur)	Animated short	10/2010	BY-SA 3.0	homepage link	Created with the Kdenlive Open Source Software.
Original source footage of Tears of Steel	Reference material for easing technical development of movie technology	2013-03-15	CC-BY (no usage of actor footage for commercials)	Xiph.org	This is a first time addressing of the huge lack in available free high quality footage for motion tracking, keying and cleaning testing. The material was recorded with the Sony F65 camera (4k native sensor, see also Ultra HD) and is formed by roughly 80,000 frames, each in OpenEXR half float files, in 4096 x 2160 pixels. This is 5 times more footage than used in the film. For the movie production the format encoding Rec709 “scene linear” was used in the processing pipeline.

== Documentary ==
An open-source documentary film has a production process allowing the open contributions of archival material footage, and other filmic elements, both in unedited and edited form, similar to crowdsourcing. By doing so, on-line contributors become part of the process of creating the film, helping to influence the editorial and visual material to be used in the documentary, as well as its thematic development. The first open-source documentary film is the non-profit WBCN and the American Revolution, which went into development in 2006, and will examine the role media played in the cultural, social and political changes from 1968 to 1974 through the story of radio station WBCN-FM in Boston. The film is being produced by Lichtenstein Creative Media and the non-profit Center for Independent Documentary. Open Source Cinema is a website to create Basement Tapes, a feature documentary about copyright in the digital age, co-produced by the National Film Board of Canada.

== See also ==
- Open Source Cinema
- Filmmaking
- Free video
- Open content
- Open source
