= Tears of Steel =

2012 film

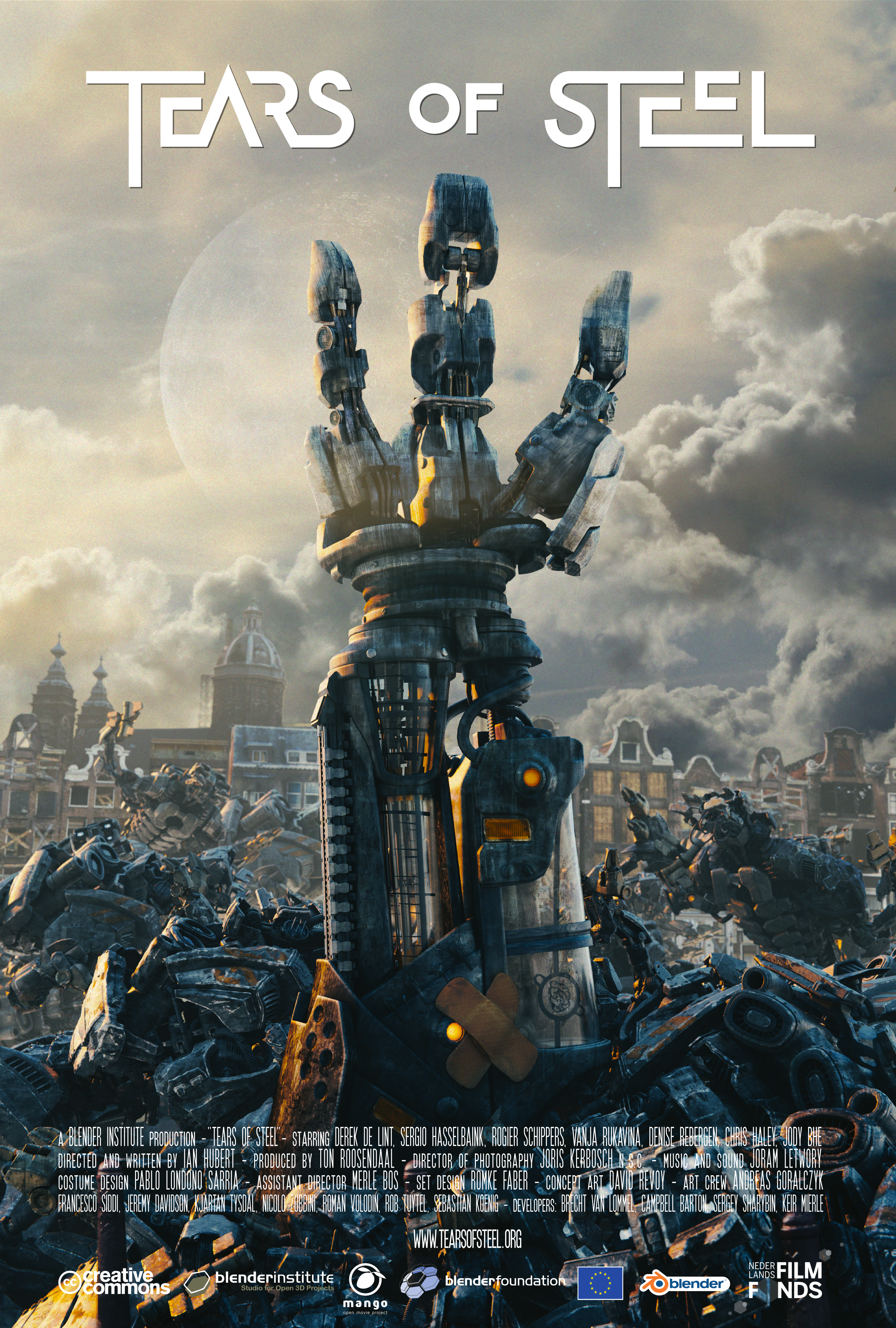
- Promotional poster
- Directed by: Ian Hubert
- Written by: Ian Hubert
- Produced by: Ton Roosendaal
- Starring: Derek de Lint; Sergio Hasselbaink; Rogier Schippers; Vanja Rukavina; Denise Rebergen; Jody Bhe; Chris Haley
- Cinematography: Joris Kerbosch
- Music by: Joram Letwory
- Distributed by: Blender Foundation
- Release date: September 26, 2012
- Running time: 12 minutes 14 seconds
- Country: Netherlands
- Language: English

Full movie

Tears of Steel (code-named Project Mango) is a short science fiction film by producer Ton Roosendaal and director/writer Ian Hubert. The film is both live-action and CGI; it was made using new enhancements to the visual effects capabilities of Blender, a free and open-source 3D computer graphics app. Set in a dystopian future, the short film features a group of warriors and scientists who gather at the Oude Kerk in Amsterdam in a desperate attempt to save the world from destructive robots.

== Overview ==
Work began in early 2012 as the Mango Open Movie Project. The film is a combination of live-action and computer generated sets, props and special effects. It was officially released online for viewing and download on September 26, 2012.

Tears of Steel is the fifth project from the Blender Foundation, following Elephants Dream, Big Buck Bunny, Yo Frankie! and Sintel. It was created by the Blender Institute, a division of the foundation set up specifically to facilitate the creation of open-content films and games.

The film was funded by the Blender Foundation, donations from the Blender community, pre-sales of the film's DVD, the Netherlands Film Fund and Cinegrid Amsterdam. The film itself and any material made in the studio are released under the Creative Commons Attribution License.

== Plot ==
The short begins with a view of a rocket lifting off. Thom (Vanja Rukavina) and Celia (Denise Rebergen) are standing on a bridge, arguing. Thom says both of them need to follow their passions; his is to be an astronaut and hers is the field of robotics. Celia, however, correctly concludes that Thom is scared of her robotic hand and breaks up with him.

Forty years later, killer robots created by Celia have taken over a deserted Amsterdam. Atop of a modified, futuristic Oude Kerk, Barley (Sergio Hasselbaink) remotely activates the lights of a flying vehicle. Giant quadrupedal robots immediately attack the vehicle. With the robots distracted, Barley lowers an older Thom (Derek de Lint) into the Oude Kerk. There, a small team of scientists have prepared augmented reality projectors and are preparing to simulate the same bridge location shown earlier in the film, along with a robot in containment. They appear to be attempting to overwrite the memories of the trapped robot. The captain (Rogier Schippers) commands the scientists to start. Thom walks into the simulation, at which point his physical appearance transforms into the younger version of himself. One of the scientists then transforms the robot into Celia.

Thom relives the breakup moment in the simulation, in hopes of calming Celia and neutralizing the robots. The captain, using a teleprompter, orders Thom to respond to Celia's conclusion with "Celia, I love your robot hand", but Thom instead says "Listen, Celia, I was young, and a dick, but that's no reason to destroy the world." Celia grabs Thom by the face and seemingly prepares to kill him. The captain and his team panic, as this sentence has previously been tested and proven not to work. Scientists' attempts to abort the simulation, however, fails. Meanwhile, the killer robots break into Oude Kerk. Barley opens fire and other scientists join the fray using unconventional energy weapons.

Thom, nevertheless, is not harmed. As the memory overwrite process reaches completion, he ends the simulation by saying, "The world's changed, Celia. Maybe we can too." The trapped robot shows signs of calming down. Thom and "Celia" embrace as the other robots close in on them. Since they are not showing signs of aggression, it is implied that the experiment has ended successfully. The captain proclaims that it had lessons for them.

In a post credit scene, a breathless Barley is shown siting atop a heap of fallen robots, sipping mango juice.

== Technical information ==
The live-action footage was filmed digitally using a Sony F65 CineAlta digital motion picture camera. The finished film is available for viewing and download in 4K and HD resolutions, Dolby 5.1 audio and 2.35:1 aspect ratio format.

Filming was done in Amsterdam, the Netherlands.

All visual effects, computer-generated content and compositing work was done within the Blender software package.

The Mango Open Movie Channel on YouTube contains several videos explaining development and the techniques used by the team in making the film. There is also a behind-the-scenes documentary by user Sutrabla entitled "Throw it in the Canal."

On March 15, 2013, the computer-based film makers released the source material (about 5 times the length of the used materials) into the public using the CC-by license with the major restriction that images of the actors shall not be used for commercials. The material is available using the OpenEXR half float file encoding and makes up 4 TB of data for roughly 80,000 frames using a dimension of 4096 × 2160 pixels (see also Ultra HD). It is the intention of the releasers to ease future developments for the film industry and other areas of image processing by making available this noticeably large amount of high definition professionally shot test data that has not been seen until now.

=== Improvements to Blender ===
As with the previous Blender Open Movie Projects, the Blender developers and community worked together to provide a movie studio style production work flow for the team. The results are a complete open source pipeline for visual effects work in Blender including but not limited to camera tracking, rotoscoping, compositing and color grading.

These features are available starting with Blender v. 2.64.

== Reception ==
The reviewer David Masters praised the film's visual effects while noting that the acting was wooden in places.
