= DrQueue =

Render farm management software

- Developer(s): DrQueue.org
- Stable release: 0.64.4
- Written in: C, C++
- Operating system: Cross-platform
- Type: Rendering
- License: GPL
- Website: www.drqueue.org

DrQueue is an open source software tool used to manage a render farm. It provides distributed render queueing on a per-frame basis and management of these tasks. It is primarily used for animations used as visual effects in films and advertising.

== Overview ==
The application is composed of three main tools: master, slave and drqman.

A task in DrQueue is composed of multiple jobs all of which require a script which is distributed to the slave nodes of the cluster by the master. The master acts as a central server, where all tasks are stored. The slave software is run on each node in the cluster and it reports its status back to the master periodically.

drqman is the GUI used to control jobs. Typical tasks are to reprioritize jobs, stop them, restart specific frames, change frames to be rendered and so on. It has direct control of Maya, Mental Ray, Blender, XSI, Lightwave, Mantra (in Houdini), Turtle (Illuminate Labs), BMRT, Shake, After Effects, Aqsis, Nuke, Terragen, 3Delight, and Pixie.

There is also a small python web service called DrKeewee that allows you to check the status of the queue using a web browser.

=== Script generators ===
Drqueue comes with a number of script generators for render applications as well as support for general batch processing applications. It also has bindings for python as well as (in beta) bindings for Ruby

Script generators exist for,

- Blender
- Maya
- 3ds Max (formerly 3D Studio MAX)
- StudioTools

=== Supported platforms ===
DrQueue supports any mix of Linux, Mac OS X, Irix, FreeBSD and Windows with no restrictions on architecture.

== Production use of DrQueue ==
The following productions have used DrQueue,

- Elephants Dream
- One Night with the King
- Pirates of the Caribbean: Dead Man's Chest
- Exorcist: The Beginning
- Bee Season
- Dark City
- Harsh Times
- Santa Clause 3
- Friday or another day ("Vendredi ou un autre jour")
- Donkey Xote (Spain)
- The Hairy Tooth Fairy ("Pérez, el ratoncito de tus sueños")
- Nocturna
