= Spring (2019 film) =

2019 animated fantasy short film

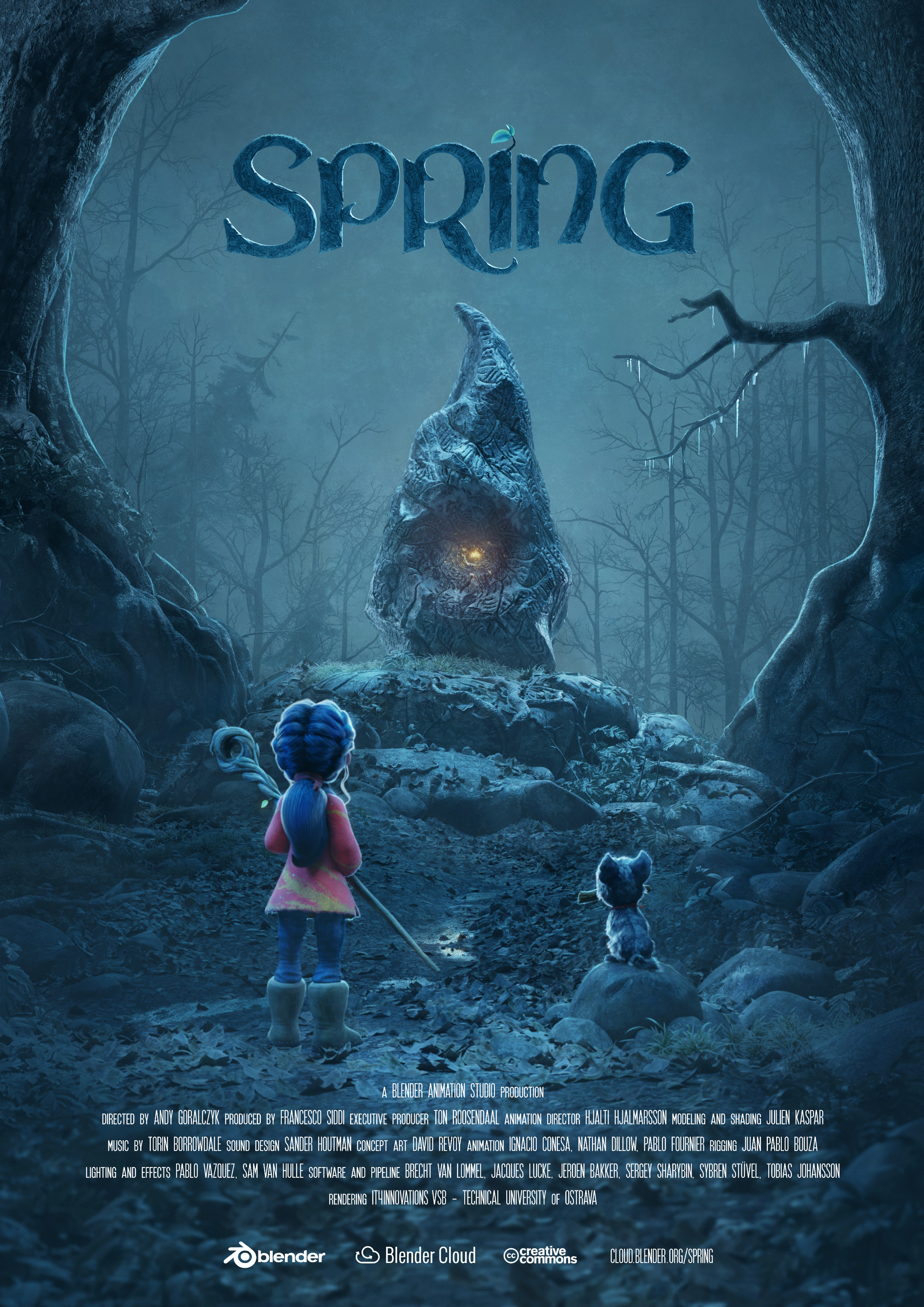
- Pillar poster by Blender Studio
- Directed by: Andreas Goralczyk
- Written by: Andreas Goralczyk
- Produced by: Ton Roosendaal; Francesco Siddi
- Music by: Torin Borrowdale
- Animation by: Hjalti Hjalmarsson (Animation director); Ignacio Conesa; Nathan Dillow; Pablo Fournier
- Production company: Blender Studio
- Distributed by: Blender Foundation
- Release date: April 4, 2019
- Running time: 8 minutes
- Country: Netherlands

Spring is a 2019 animated fantasy short film written and directed by Andreas Goralczyk and produced by Ton Roosendaal and Francesco Siddi. It is the Blender Institute's 12th "open movie", and was made utilizing the open-source software, Blender. The film is about a young shepherd and her dog confronting ancient spirits in order to bring about the change of seasons. The film was funded by the Blender Foundation, with donations from the Blender community. The film and any material made in the studio was released under a Creative Commons License.

On April 4, 2019, the film was first released on YouTube. As of November 2024, it had over 10 million views.

== Plot ==
Spring, full movie

High above the clouds, young shepherdess Spring descends into the frozen forest below. The atmosphere is dark and misty, in direct contrast with the sunny springtime weather above; the clouds causing this surround the heads of ancient spirits that have been freezing the forest, who take the form of anthropomorphic creatures bearing four tree-legs. She calls them by banging on a large rock with a wooden staff. She pays respect to the Alpha, the one that lowers its head from the clouds. It strikes its antennae against Spring's staff to play music, and she, in turn, finishes the melody. The creature sheds one of its musical antenna parts (a chime), which she plugs into the eye of her staff to activate it a glowing red color. With the power she now has, the other spirits awaken and begin moving towards her.

However, a tree gets knocked to the ground by one of the creatures, knocking the staff and throwing the chime afar, upsetting the creatures who chase after it. Just as the chime is about to be stepped on, Spring grabs it and reattaches it to her staff. She immediately regains control of the spirits, using her staff with the glowing red chime to direct the creatures away from her. Turning around, the creatures are herded like sheep up out of the clouded valley, causing the clouds to disperse and healing the land from its deep freeze. Flora blooms, and ices melt.

Numerous chain-strings cascade from the top of a rock wall, with the chimes of years past lodged, alternating perpendicularly, into each chink of the chain. Spring sticks the newest chime into the first available slot.

== Production ==
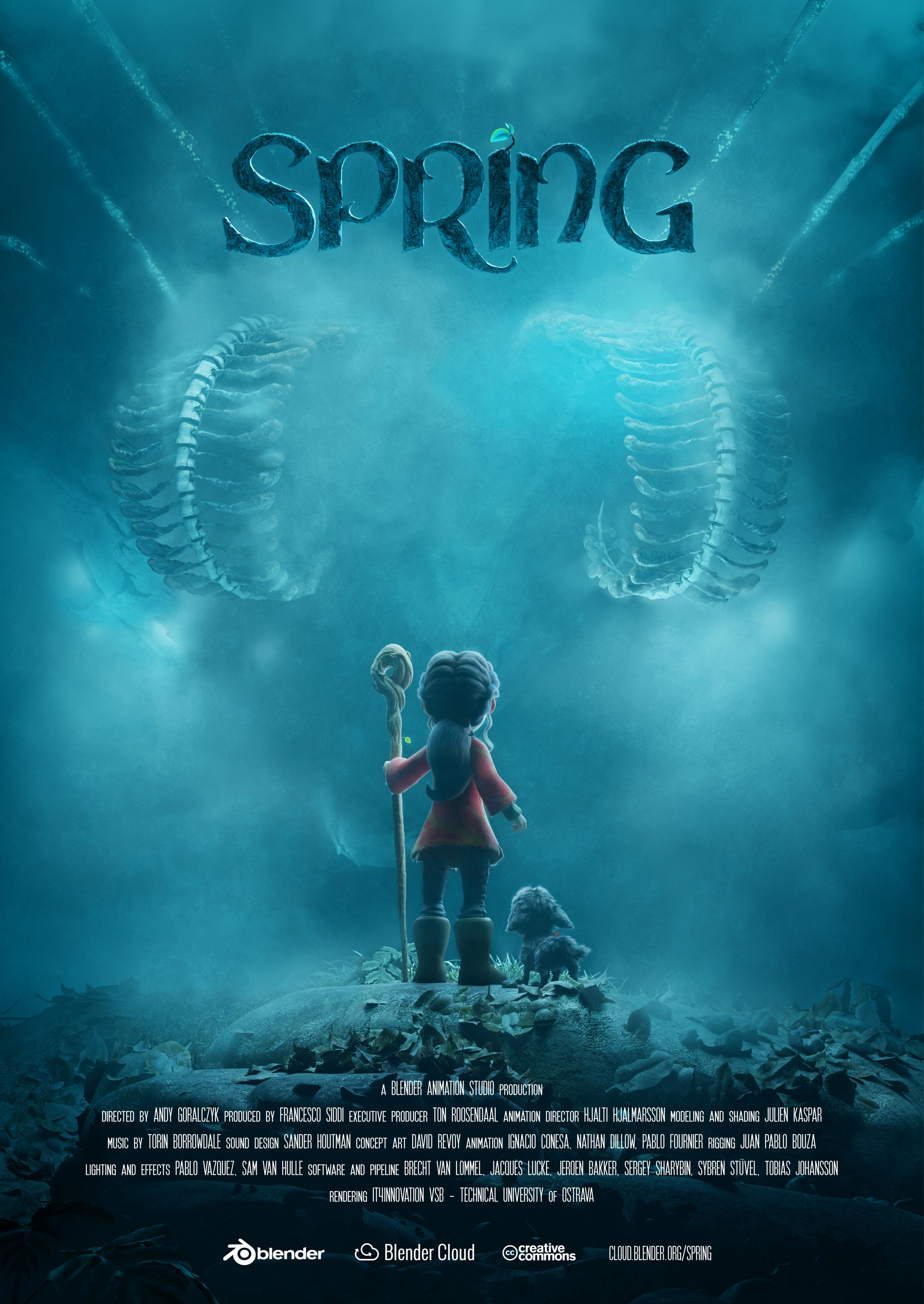
The original movie poster for the release of Spring

The film was written and directed by Andreas Goralczyk. The film's initial art direction and character design was done by David Revoy, who is known for Pepper&Carrot, an open source webcomic series, and has worked on three other Blender Foundation short films as a concept artist. It was produced by Ton Roosendaal and Francesco Siddi. The production team of Spring started by using Blender 2.79 and very early into the production shifted to version 2.80, which was still in beta. The character and asset files for the film were released under the CC-By 4.0 Creative Commons License on Blender Cloud. The musical director played a large role in the final film, as not a single word is spoken and the story is entirely driven by music.

After collecting various "reference and inspirational material" for the film, graphic artist Julien Kaspar discussed his ideas with Goralczyk before starting development on the film. The cast choreographed a climax scene of the film for reference material, which needed to portray the stress that Spring felt. Once the film's concepts were approved by the director, "Nacho" Conesa started rigging and creating the animations. The detail of the base topology for the meshes was critical for adding details later. UV unwrapping was utilized in the process of texture painting and baking. The base meshes for the film's characters had to be shipped to the rigging department for several layout shots, which created constraints as to the further development of the character models. Ultimately, the shot where Spring has fallen and must get up to chase after the chime took 2–3 weeks to animate; while polishing the splined version, work could begin on the next shot.

== Reception ==
Writing for Film Inquiry, Adam Mock opens his review article with, "Spring has sprung and the result is truly a thing of beauty." A "simple idea" with "complex elegance", he compares the use of music as an interspecies language to Spielberg's Close Encounters of the Third Kind. He praises the film for simultaneously having a simple set up, a girl and her dog, and a complex mysterious environment. He writes the film goes toe-to-toe with feature-length films by major studios that have larger budgets. In his mind, the lore could be expanded with a sequel, but it also stands quite well on its own.

The film received a positive response from critics and the public. It had over 5.2 million views on YouTube as of September 2020.

=== Accolades ===
| Ceremony | Award | Date of ceremony | Result | Ref(s) |
|---|---|---|---|---|
| Mundos Digitales International Animation Festival | Best Short Film | July 13, 2019 | Won | |
| Animago Award & Conference 2019 | Best Short Film | November 2–4, 2019 | Nominated | |
