= Free video =

Video content that is free to use for any purpose

Free video is video content that is free to use for any purpose, or licensed under a free and open license to such an effect, at least for distribution, and at most for modification and commercial usage. This can also apply to graphical animations.

== Free video and included media ==
To be a free video - referring to freedom (as in free software), not to price - a video's entire content must be previously licensed under a free content license. A video is considered legally unfree if any portion of the video was previously licensed under a proprietary license that restricts usage and prevents derivations and commercial usage.

Under this approach, a video cannot be considered free if it includes snippets or whole copies of any text, image, video or audio that has been previously licensed under a proprietary, unfree license. The legal concept of fair use of a third party's music or other content in one's own video work may protect against DMCA takedowns. In the 2015 court case Lenz v. Universal Music Group Inc., the court determined that Universal Music Group should have considered fair use before issuing a take-down. The case focuses on the usage of a song licensed by Universal that was used in a YouTube video of a dancing toddler.

== Free video on Wikipedia and the Wikimedia Commons ==
Free video is used extensively on Wikipedia, and is also the exclusive type of video content stored on the Wikimedia Commons. While Wikipedia allows for the uploading of fair use video., the Wikimedia Commons strictly forbids the uploading of fair use video or any video containing depiction of symbols or other content that is prior licensed under a proprietary license.

== See also ==
- Free music
- Open content
- Open source film
