= Big Buck Bunny =

2008 animated comedy short film

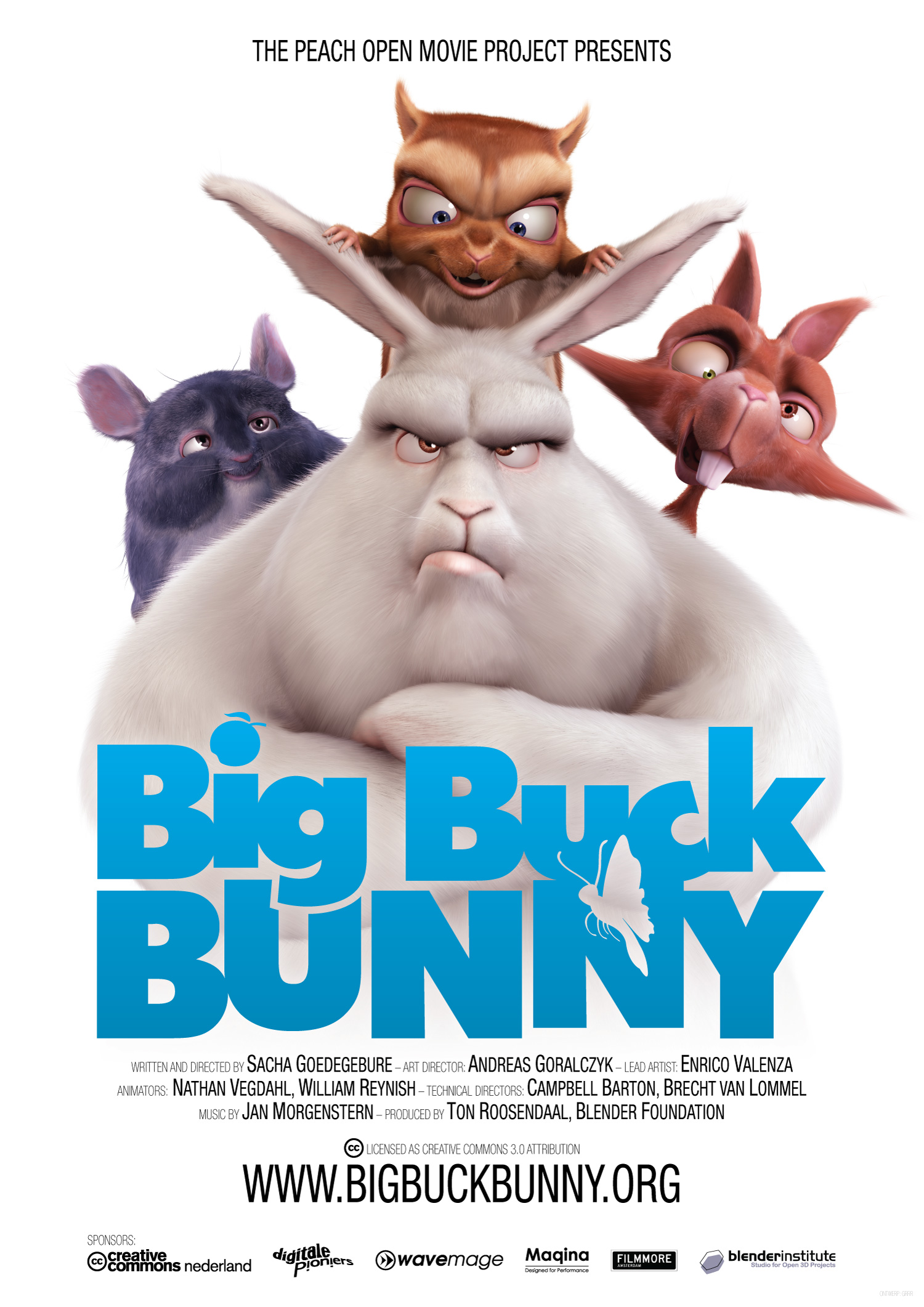
- Film poster
- Directed by: Sacha Goedegebure
- Written by: Sacha Goedegebure
- Produced by: Ton Roosendaal
- Music by: Jan Morgenstern
- Release dates: April 10, 2008 (Amsterdam premiere); May 20, 2008
- Running time: 10 minutes
- Country: Netherlands
- Budget: €150,000

Big Buck Bunny (code-named Project Peach) is a 2008 animated comedy short film featuring animals of the forest, made by the Blender Institute, part of the Blender Foundation. Like the foundation's previous film, Elephants Dream, the film was made using Blender, a free and open-source software application for 3D computer modeling and animation developed by the same foundation. Unlike that earlier project, the tone and visuals departed from a cryptic story and dark visuals to one of comedy, cartoons, and light-heartedness.

It was released as an open-source film under the Creative Commons Attribution 2.5 license.

== Plot ==
Big Buck Bunny (2008). 10 minutes, 35 seconds.

The plot follows a day in the life of JC, a big buck bunny, during which time he meets a trio of bullying rodents: the leader, Frank the flying squirrel, and his sidekicks Rinky the red squirrel and Gimera the chinchilla. The rodents amuse themselves by harassing helpless creatures of the forest by throwing fruits, nuts, and rocks at them.

After the rodents kill two butterflies with an apple and a rock, and then attack Bunny, he sets aside his gentle nature and orchestrates a complex plan to avenge the two butterflies.

Using a variety of traps, Bunny first dispatches Rinky and Gimera. Frank, unaware of the fate of the other two, is seen taking off from a tree, and gliding towards a seemingly unsuspecting Bunny. Once airborne, Frank triggers Bunny's final series of traps, causing Frank to crash into a tree branch and plummet into a spike trap below. At the last moment, Frank grabs onto what he believes is the branch of a small tree, but discovers it is just a twig Bunny is holding over the spikes. Bunny snatches up Frank.

The film concludes with Bunny being pleased with himself as a butterfly flies past him holding a string, at the end of which is Frank attached as a flying kite, with a post-credits scene showing a bird defecating on Frank before cutting to black.

== Production ==
Following Elephants Dream (2006), Big Buck Bunny is the first project by the Blender Foundation to be created by the Blender Institute, a division of the foundation set up specifically to facilitate the creation of open content films and games.

Work began in October 2007. The film was funded by the Blender Foundation, donations from the Blender community, pre-sales of the film's DVD and commercial sponsorship. Both the final product and production data, including animation data, characters and textures are released under the Creative Commons Attribution License. It was rendered on Sun Microsystems' grid computing facility Sun Grid.

As in Elephants Dream, Blender developers worked extensively to improve the software in accordance with the needs of the movie team. Improvements were made in hair and fur rendering, the particle system, UV mapping, shading, the render pipeline, constraints, and skinning. Also introduced during the project was approximate ambient occlusion. These features were released to the public with Blender 2.46.

== Release ==
The film was officially released in an April 10, 2008 premiere in Amsterdam while online movie downloads and files were released on May 30, 2008.

The film's complete score was released on June 6, 2008 under the Creative Commons Attribution-Noncommercial-NoDerivatives 3.0 license. It was available to download in MP3 and OGG Vorbis file formats.

On May 2, 2012 the film was released on Nintendo Video in Europe as part of a special partnership with Nintendo and the Blender Foundation. It was split into three installments, with one releasing each week. The film was recreated in stereoscopic 3D by Studio Lumikuu.

High-resolution, stereoscopic, high-frame-rate versions of the film were released in 2013 by Janus Kristensen's Big and Ugly Rendering Project running on the Berkeley Open Infrastructure for Network Computing platform.

The film was followed up with an open game titled Yo Frankie!, in August 2008.

== Characters ==
The main character (called Big Buck Bunny) was also used in short films created by Studio Lumikuu and Renderfarm.fi: What is Renderfarm.fi? (2011) telling about the advantages of render farms and BBB loves CC (2012) promoting Creative Commons licences.

The bunny's voice was performed by Jan Morgenstern, the composer of the film's soundtrack.

Frank the flying squirrel is also the player character in the Blender Institute's 2009 video game Yo Frankie!.

== Legacy ==
Big Buck Bunny is commonly used to test video playback since it is licensed under Creative Commons Attribution 3.0 as well as being bright and colorful.

== Use ==
The first ten seconds of this movie has been used in Android API demos used for testing Android emulators when Android was new.

It has also been used in countless examples when representing how to create videos using the video element in HTML.

It is often used as a stress test for video codecs, as it is freely redistributable and available as a lossless source, and its high contrast, high motion, and mixture of flat and detailed scenes make it difficult to encode.

== See also ==
- Elephants Dream (2006)
- Sintel (2010)
- Tears of Steel (2012)
