= Love (2010 video game) =

2010 massively multiplayer online video game

- Developer: Eskil Steenberg
- Platform: Windows
- Release: March 25, 2010
- Genre: Massively multiplayer online role-playing game
- Mode: Multiplayer

Love is a massively multiplayer online role-playing game (MMORPG) created by Eskil Steenberg. Unlike most such games, the content in Love is almost entirely procedurally generated. Another major difference is that there are no predetermined quests; instead, the gameplay is emergent from the interactions of players with each other, with NPCs and the environment. Love uses skill-based progression and any benefits gained from defeating NPC enemies apply to all players from the same settlement.

The graphics style of Love is painterly and impressionistic, using relatively simple geometric objects and then adding dynamic details via textured fan polygons and fullscreen filters. In an interview with Jim Rossignol of Rock, Paper, Shotgun, Eskil explained his reasoning behind this style, stating that 'any game you make should clear the "flick through a magazine" test. When you flick through a magazine you should instantly recognize the game'.

Love makes use of the Verse protocol, a network protocol allowing for real-time transfer and synchronisation of 3D graphics and audio data.
