= Ton Roosendaal =

Dutch software developer (born 1960)

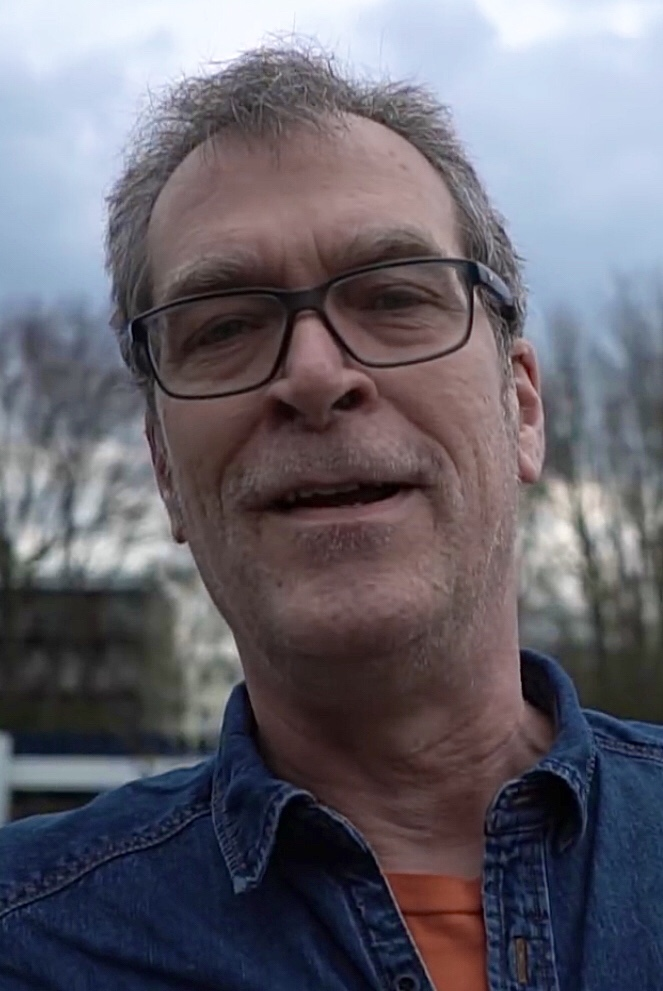
- Roosendaal in 2018
- Born: 20 March 1960 (age 66); Netherlands
- Education: Eindhoven University of Technology (BSc)
- Occupations: Software developer, film producer
- Employer: Blender Institute
- Known for: Creator of Blender; Open-content projects, including Elephants Dream, Big Buck Bunny, Yo Frankie!, Sintel, and Tears of Steel
- Title: Founder and Chairman, Blender Foundation

Ton Roosendaal (Dutch: [tɔn ˈroːzə(n)ˌdaːl]; born 20 March 1960) is a Dutch software developer and film producer. He is the original creator of the open-source 3D creation suite Blender and Traces (an Amiga ray tracer which was the forerunner of Blender). He is also known as the founder and chairman of the Blender Foundation, and for pioneering large scale open-content projects. In 2007, he established the Blender Institute in Amsterdam, where he works on coordinating Blender development, publishing manuals and DVD training, and organizing 3D animation and game projects.

== Early years ==
Roosendaal studied Industrial Design in Eindhoven, before founding the animation studio "NeoGeo" in 1989. It quickly became the largest 3D animation studio in the Netherlands. At NeoGeo, Roosendaal was responsible for software development, in 1989 he wrote a ray tracer called Traces for Amiga and in 1995 he decided to start the development of an in-house software tool for 3D animation, based on the Traces and tools that NeoGeo had already written. This tool was later named "Blender". In January 1998, a free version of Blender was released on the internet, followed by versions for Linux and FreeBSD in April. Shortly after that, NeoGeo was taken over by another company in parts. This was when Ton Roosendaal and Frank van Beek decided to found a company called Not a Number (NaN) to further market and develop Blender. NaN's business model involved providing commercial products and services around Blender. In 2000 the company secured growth financing by several investment companies. The target of this was to create a free creation tool for interactive 3D (online) content, and commercial versions of the software for distribution and publishing. Roosendaal moved to Amsterdam in 2002.

Due to low sales and the ongoing difficult economic climate, the NaN investors decided to shut down all operations in January/February 2002, signalling the end of Blender development. However, in May 2002, with support from the community of users, and Blender customers, Ton Roosendaal founded the non-profit Blender Foundation.

== Blender Foundation ==
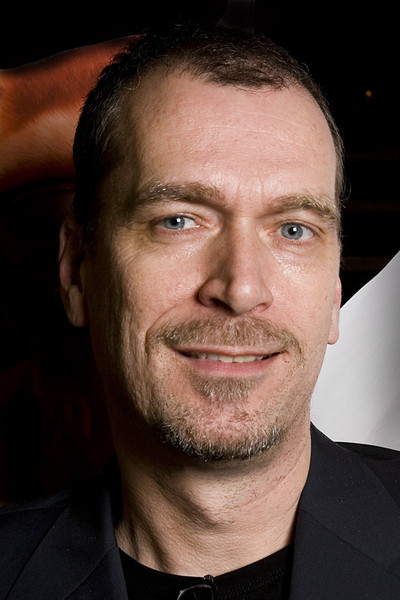
Roosendaal at the Big Buck Bunny premiere in 2008

The Blender Foundation's first goal was to find a way to continue developing and promoting Blender as a community based open source project. In July 2002, NaN investors agreed on a plan to attempt to publish Blender under an open-source license using the Street Performer Protocol. The "Free Blender" campaign sought to raise 100,000 EUR as a one-time fee so that the NaN investors would agree on open sourcing Blender. The campaign reached this goal in only seven weeks. On Sunday 13 October 2002, Blender was therefore released under the terms of the GNU General Public License. After this success, Ton Roosendaal began to coordinate the development of Blender by volunteers as chairman of the Blender Foundation.

With Blender originating as an in-house creation tool, feedback from the use of the tool has fed into its ongoing development. In the first two and a half years of open source development, it was especially this unique attribute of the Blender project that has proved to be difficult to organize and maintain. Instead of funding the project directly by bringing together software developers, the Blender Foundation decided to start a project with the best artists within the Blender community and challenge them to make a 3D animated movie short. The goal of the project was to simultaneously prove that Blender can be used to create a professional quality animation, and to help the development of Blender itself.

On 16 July 2009, Roosendaal was awarded an honorary doctorate in Technology at the Leeds Metropolitan University for his work on Blender.

On 2 February 2019, Ton Roosendaal and the Blender Open Source Software received the Ub Iwerks Award at the 46th Annual Annie Awards.

On 17 September 2025, Roosendaal announced plans to step down as chairman of the Blender Foundation and CEO of the Blender project on 1 January 2026. He plans to continue his involvement with the Blender project as a member of a newly established Blender Foundation supervisory board.

== Open-content projects ==
In 2005, work on Project Orange began. The result of the project was the world's first widely recognized open movie, Elephants Dream. The movie and all assets used during production were published under the open Creative Commons Attribution license.

Because of the success of the first open movie project, Ton Roosendaal established the "Blender Institute" in summer 2007. It is now the permanent office and studio of the Blender Foundation, and is mainly used as an office for the full-time employees of the Blender Foundation and to coordinate and realize the Open Projects related to 3D movies, games and visual effects.

In April 2008 Project Peach, the open movie Big Buck Bunny, was completed in the Blender Institute. In September 2008 the open game Yo Frankie! was released. The third open movie, Project Durian, also known as Sintel, was released on 30 September 2010. On 10 January 2011 he announced a fourth project, titled Tears of Steel, released in 2012, and Project Gooseberry, entitled Cosmos Laundromat, released in Summer 2015.
