= Caminandes =

Caminandes (1, 2 & 3)
- Directed by: Pablo Vazquez
- Produced by: Blender Foundation
- Country: Netherlands

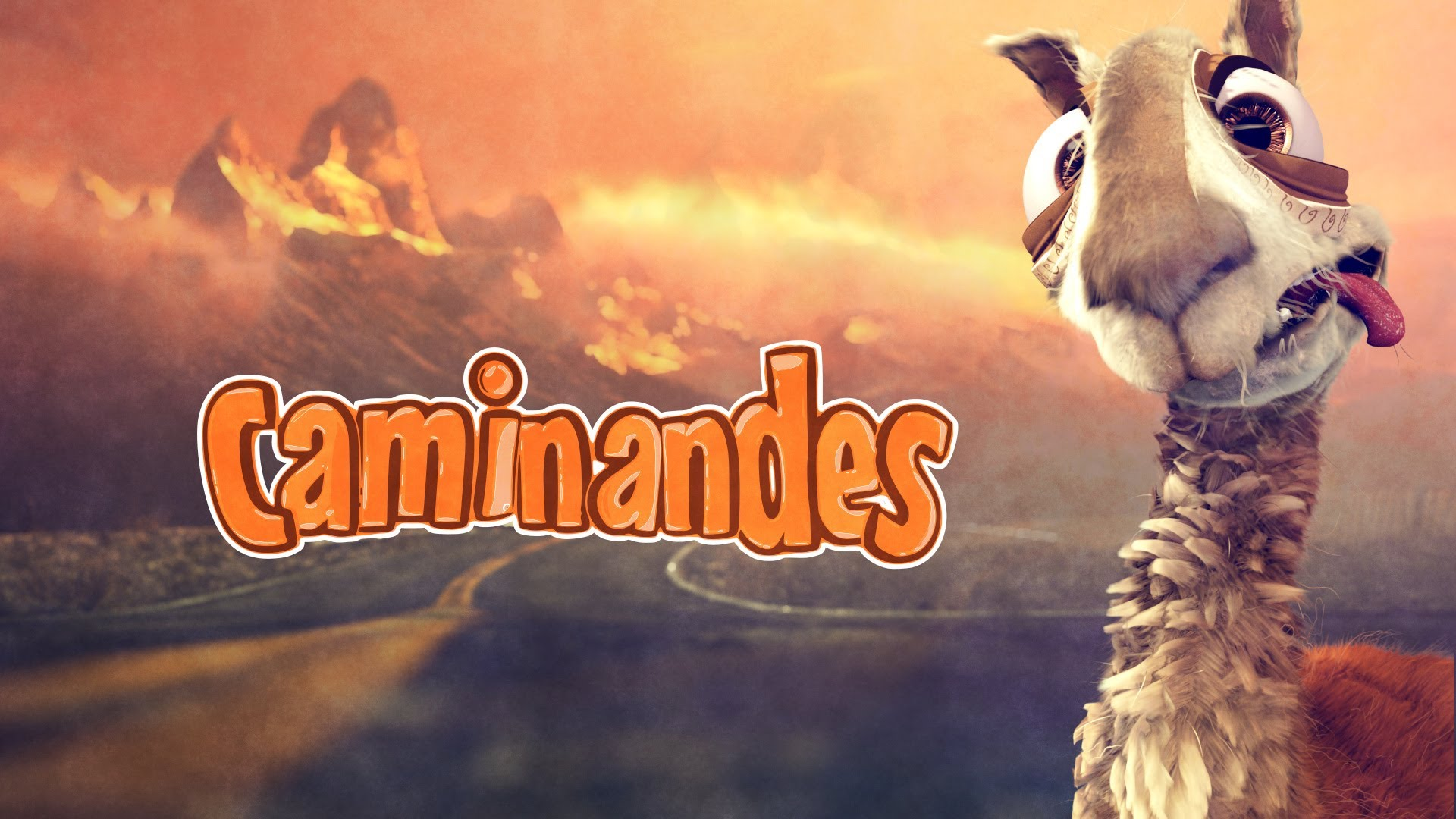
Promotional image for Llama Drama showing Koro in front of a desolate road.

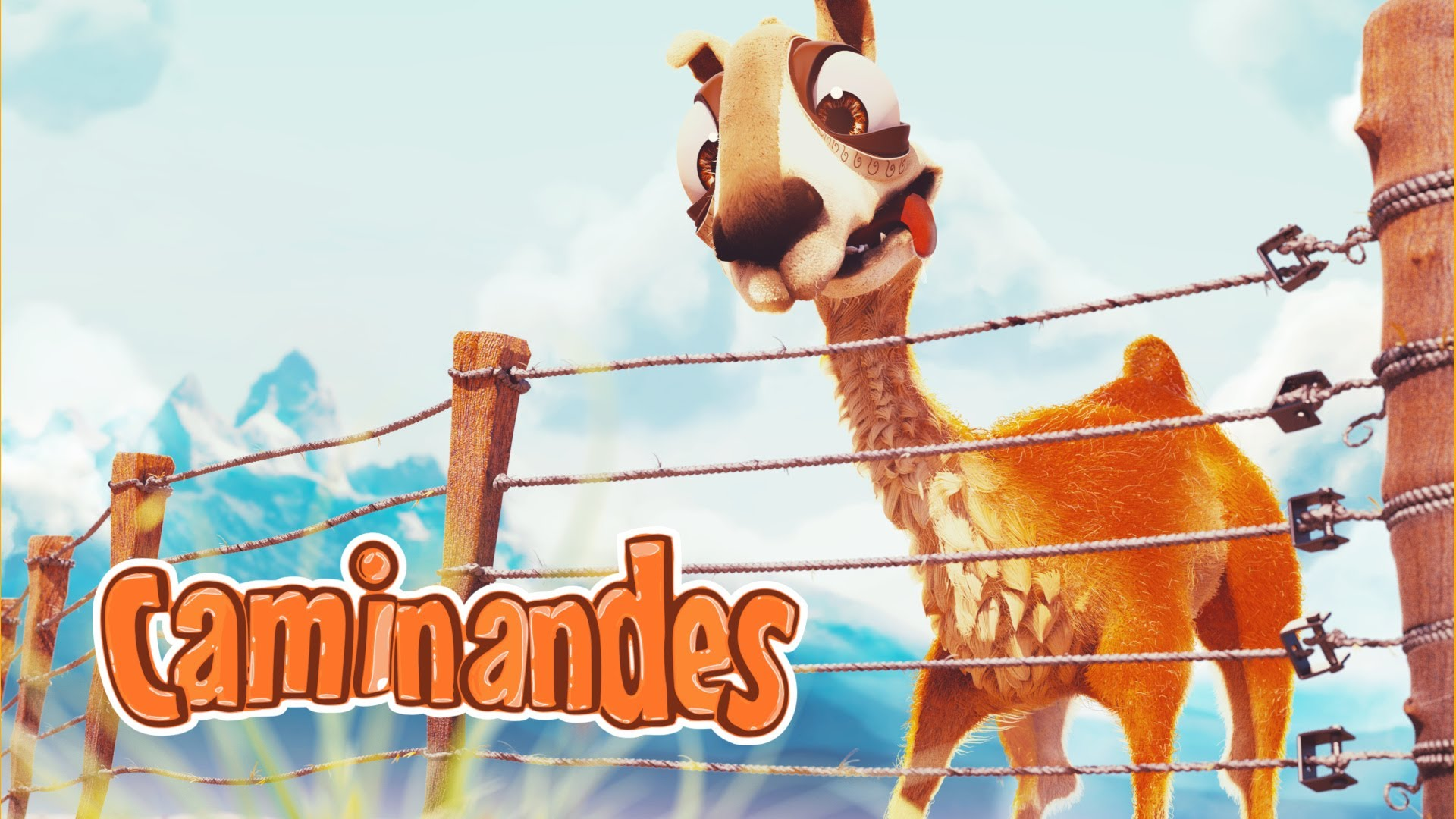
Promotional image for Gran Dillama showing Koro behind an electrical fence.

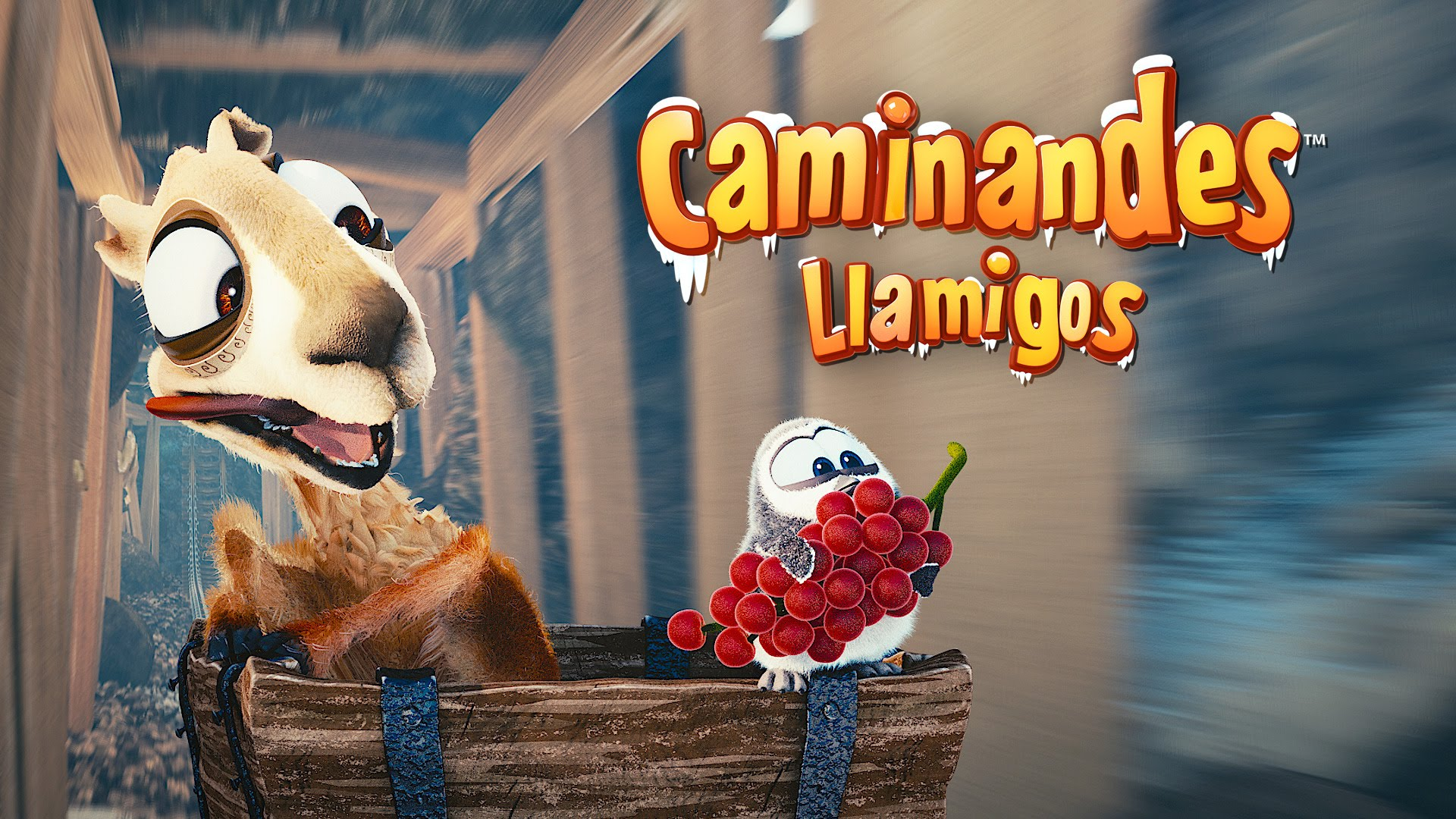
Promotional image for Llamigos showing Koro and Oti in a minecart.

Caminandes is an independently produced series of animated short films created by Pablo Vazquez (was born in Río Gallegos, Santa Cruz Province, Argentina), produced and released by the Blender Foundation.

== Etymology ==
The title "Caminandes" is a portmanteau of the Spanish word "caminar" ("to walk") and Andes, the longest continental mountain range in the world. The subtitles of episodes 2 and 3 are also portmanteaus of various Spanish words.

== Plot ==
The films center on Koro the llama (Note: More precisely, Koro is a "chulengo", a young guanaco, which is the wild counterpart to the llama.) and his attempts to overcome various obstacles in Patagonia.

Caminandes 1: Llama Drama (2013)

Koro has trouble crossing an apparent desolate road, a problem that an unwitting Armadillo does not share.

Caminandes 2: Gran Dillama (2013)

Koro hunts for food on the other side of a fence and is once again inspired by the Armadillo but this time to a shocking effect.

Caminandes 3: Llamigos (2016)

Koro meets Oti, a pesky baby magellanic penguin, in an epic battle over tasty red berries during the winter.

== Production ==
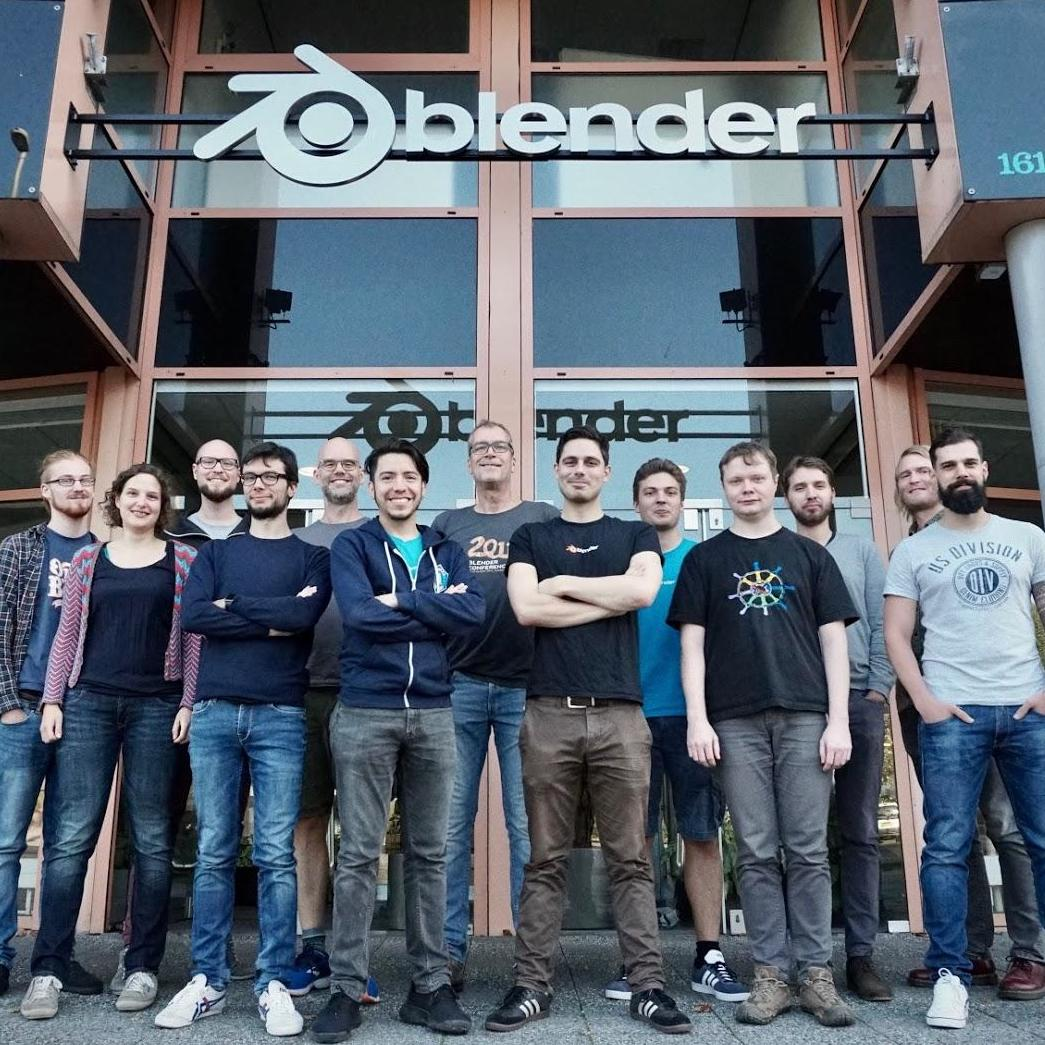
Blender Foundation Amsterdam team in September 2020, some of which were involved in the Caminandes series.

The films, inspired by the cartoons of Chuck Jones, are created using FLOSS (Free/Libre Open Source Software) such as

- Blender, a professional free and open-source 3D computer graphics software
- GIMP, a free and open-source raster graphics editor
- Krita, a free and open-source raster graphics editor based on Qt 5 and the KDE Frameworks 5
- Linux, a Unix-like computer operating system assembled under the model of free and open-source software development and distribution

The first film was produced by Pablo Vazquez, Beorn Leonard and Francesco Siddi with a soundtrack by Jan Morgenstern. Hjalti Hjalmarsson, Andy Goralczyk and Sergey Sharybin joined the production team for the second film.

== Awards ==
Jan Morgenstern won the 2014 Jerry Goldsmith award for "Best Score for an Animated Short Film" at the International Film Music Festival in Córdoba, Spain, for Gran Dillama.

== Gallery ==
Caminandes 1: Llama Drama (2013)

Caminandes 2: Gran Dillama (2013)

Caminandes 3: Llamigos (2016)
