= Blender Foundation =

Non-profit organization developing Blender

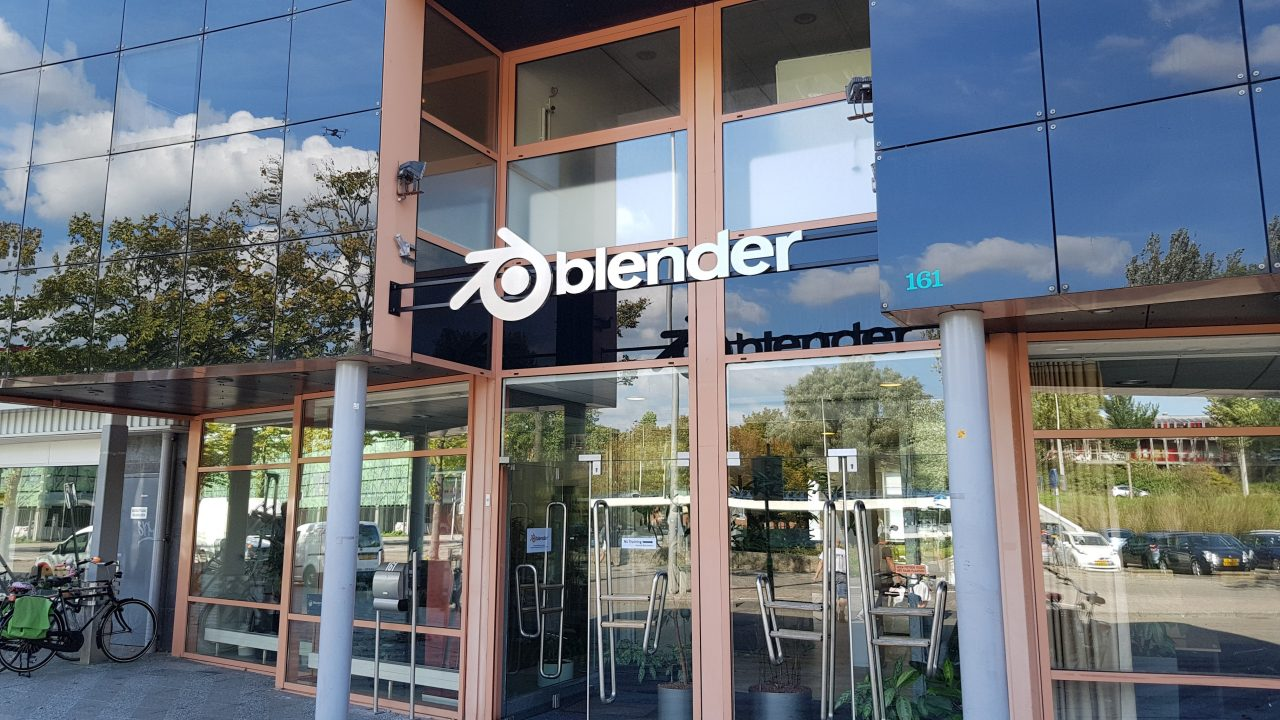
- Blender Foundation headquarters at Amsterdam, Netherlands
- Formation: May 2002; 24 years ago
- Founder: Ton Roosendaal
- Type: Stichting
- Purpose: Development of Blender
- Headquarters: Amsterdam, Netherlands
- Region served: Worldwide
- Chairman: Francesco Siddi
- Subsidiaries: Blender Institute; Blender Studio
- Employees: 31 (2022)
- Website: blender.org/about/foundation/

The Blender Foundation is a Dutch nonprofit organization (stichting) responsible for the development of Blender, an open-source 3D content-creation program.

The foundation has distributed the following animated films, shorts, and teasers: Elephants Dream (2006), Big Buck Bunny (2008), Sintel (2010), Tears of Steel (2012), Caminandes 1: Llama Drama (2013), Caminandes 2: Gran Dillama (2013), Cosmos Laundromat (2015), Glass Half (2015), Caminandes 3: Llamigos (2016), Agent 327: Operation Barbershop (2017), The Daily Dweebs (2018), Hero (2018), Spring (2019), Coffee Run (2020), Sprite Fright (2021), Charge (2022), Wing it! (2023) and Singularity (2026).

== Goals ==
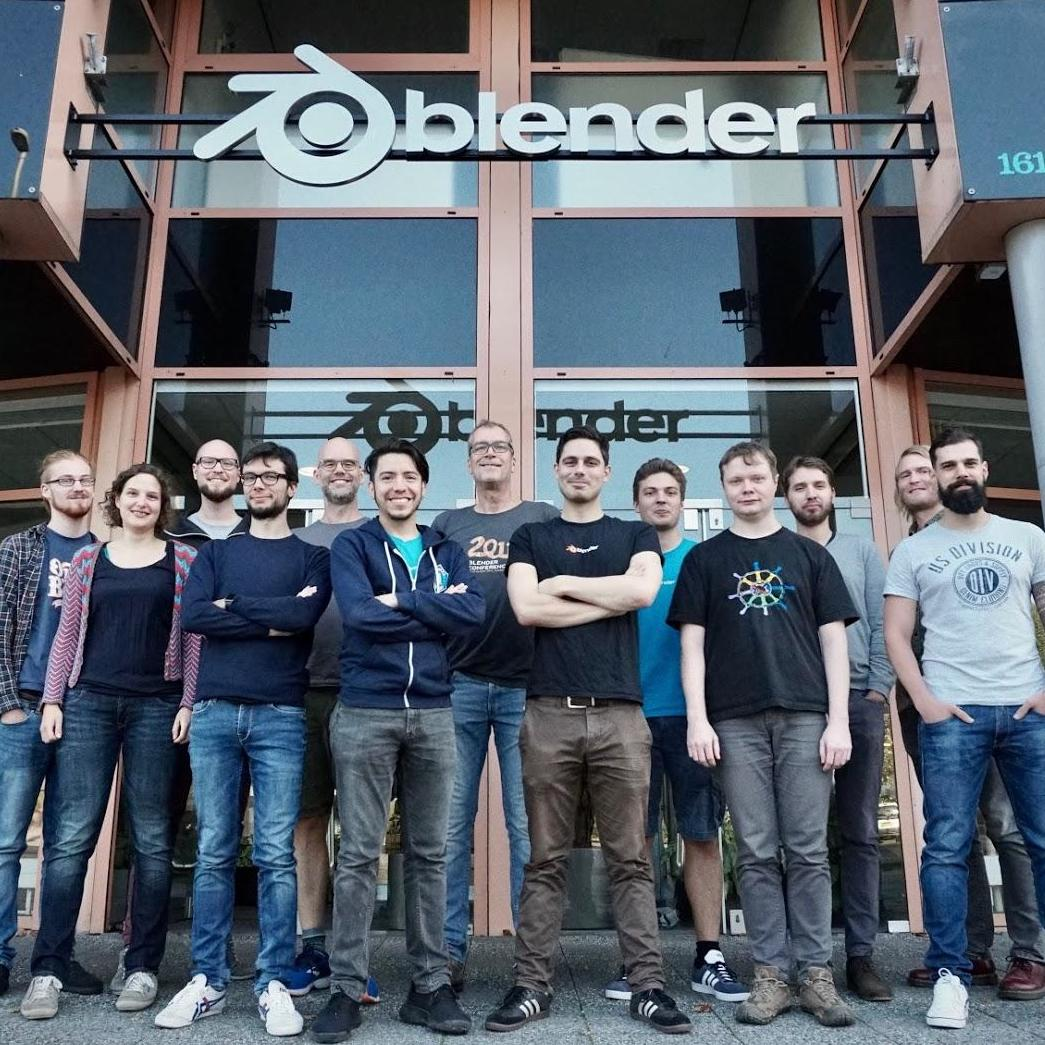
The Amsterdam team with Ton Roosendaal in front of the Blender Foundation headquarters

The foundation is chaired by Ton Roosendaal, the original author of the Blender software. One of the foundation's stated goals is "to give the worldwide Internet community access to 3D technology in general, with Blender as a core".

The foundation provides various resources to support the community formed around using and developing Blender. In particular, it organizes an annual Blender Conference in Amsterdam to discuss plans for the future of Blender, as well as staffing a booth to represent Blender at SIGGRAPH. Donations are also used to maintain the Blender website and hire developers to improve the Blender software.

== Contributors ==
The foundation is funded entirely by donations from entrepreneurs, companies, and users. Many video game publishers such as Epic Games, Ubisoft, Activision, Valve, and NetEase have made contributions. Nvidia, Intel, AMD, Meta, Microsoft, Adobe, and Google have also funded the project.

In 2019, Epic Games awarded the Blender Foundation a US$1,200,000 grant as part of their Epic MegaGrants initiative. Founder and CEO of Epic Games Tim Sweeney stated, "Open tools, libraries and platforms are critical to the future of the digital content ecosystem" and that "Blender is an enduring resource within the artistic community, and we aim to ensure its advancement to the benefit of all creators."

In December 2024, DillonGoo and his animation studio DillonGoo Studios announced that they would be partnering up with the Blender Foundation to help out with new Blender releases, while also developing non-photorealistic rendering features for the software.

== Open projects ==
The Blender Foundation maintains several community-driven "Open Projects" through its affiliated Blender Institute program, including several freely licensed films and a free, open-source video game Yo Frankie! (2008). According to the Foundation, these projects are intended "to validate and improve the 3D open source content creation pipeline with Blender". Each project was created using the Blender software and released under permissive license terms, along with the source material. In addition to demonstrating the capabilities of the software, the Open Projects provided detailed production material (sketches, tutorials, textures and models, etc.) to serve as examples for the Blender user community, as well as finished products that could be widely used for other purposes.

On 18 March 2006, the Blender Foundation released its first film, Elephants Dream. In response to the success of Elephants Dream, the Blender Foundation established the Blender Institute to support future software and content development projects. The Blender Institute operates out of a studio within the Entrepotdok building in Amsterdam, where the Blender Foundation is also located, and is headed by Ton Roosendaal.

On 10 April 2008, the Blender Institute released its second film, Big Buck Bunny. Based on the movie, the Blender Institute released its first Open Game project Yo Frankie!, in November 2008.

On 30 September 2010 the Blender Institute released its third project, Sintel.

In October 2011, Concept/Script Development began for Blender's fourth open film project titled Tears of Steel. Contrary to previous Blender Institute projects, which were 100% computer graphics, the focus of Tears of Steel was the combination of live action footage with computer generated characters and environments. The live action footage was shot with a high-end Sony F65 camera. The project was released on 26 September 2012.

The Gooseberry Open Movie Project is the fifth Open Movie Project initiated by the Blender Foundation. Ton Roosendal announced the project in January 2010. The most ambitious project yet, one of the primary goals is for the Gooseberry Open Movie Project to be the first full-length film produced by the Blender Institute. Work on the film, called Cosmos Laundromat, began in 2014 (although a release date was not yet announced). A ten-minute pilot, entitled Cosmos Laundromat: First Cycle was released on YouTube and Netflix on 10 August 2015 and premiered at the Netherlands Film Festival on 24 September 2015. The pilot won the Jury's Prize at Animago 2015, an international conference for 3D animation.

In 2013, the second episode of a short animated series Caminandes was released under the Blender Foundation umbrella. In 2016, a third short was released.

- Caminandes 1: Llama Drama (2013)
- Caminandes 2: Gran Dillama (2013)
- Caminandes 3: Llamigos (2016)

Hero, the sixth Open Movie Project, was announced in September 2017 and released on 16th April 2018. The technical target for Hero was to use and improve the Grease Pencil tools.

Sprite Fright, a short animated comedy-horror was announced on 9 November 2020 and released on 29 October 2021.

Charge was released the 15 December 2022.

Pet Projects was announced on 19 January 2023. The official release title is "WING IT!" and was released the 12 September 2023.

Project Gold was announced on 22 May 2023. It was focused around non-photorealistic rendering (NPR) and led to the Open Movie Project titled "Singularity", released on May 11, 2026.

=== Filmography ===
No.	Title	Release date	Notes
1	Elephants Dream	March 24, 2006	Project Orange
In September 2005, some of the most notable Blender artists and developers began working on a short film using primarily free software, in an initiative known as the Orange Movie Project hosted by the Netherlands Media Art Institute (NIMk). The codename, "Orange", about the fruit, started the trend of giving each project a different fruity name. The resulting film, Elephants Dream, premiered on March 24, 2006.
2	Big Buck Bunny	May 20, 2008	Project Peach
On October 1, 2007, a new team started working on a second open project, "Peach", for the production of the short movie Big Buck Bunny. This time, however, the creative concept was different. Instead of the deep and mystical style of Elephants Dream, things are more "funny and furry" according to the official site. The movie had its premiere on April 10, 2008. This later made its way to Nintendo 3DS's Nintendo Video in May 2012.
3	Sintel	September 30, 2010	Project Durian
The Blender Foundation's Project Durian (in keeping with the tradition of fruits as code names) was this time chosen to make a fantasy action epic of about twelve minutes in length, starring a teenage girl and a young dragon as the main characters. The film premiered online on September 30, 2010. A game based on Sintel was officially announced on Blenderartists.org on May 12, 2010. Many of the new features integrated into Blender 2.5 and beyond were a direct result of Project Durian.
4	Tears of Steel	September 26, 2012	Project Mango
On October 2, 2011, the fourth open movie project, codenamed "Mango", was announced by the Blender Foundation. A team of artists assembled using an open call of community participation. It is the first Blender open movie to use live action as well as CG. Filming for Mango started on May 7, 2012, and the movie was released on September 26, 2012. As with the previous films, all footage, scenes and models were made available under a free content compliant Creative Commons license. According to the film's press release, "The film's premise is about a group of warriors and scientists, who gather at the 'Oude Kerk' in Amsterdam to stage a crucial event from the past, in a desperate attempt to rescue the world from destructive robots."
5	Caminandes 1: Llama Drama	2013	Part of the Caminandes series
Caminandes is a series of animated short films envisioned by Pablo Vazquez of Argentina. It centers on a llama named Koro in Patagonia and his attempts to overcome various obstacles. The series only became part of the Open Movie Project starting with the second episode. In this episode, Koro has trouble crossing an apparent desolate road, a problem that an unwitting Armadillo does not share.
6	Caminandes 2: Gran Dillama	November 22, 2013	Part of the Caminandes series
Caminandes is a series of animated short films envisioned by Pablo Vazquez of Argentina. It centers on a llama named Koro in Patagonia and his attempts to overcome various obstacles. The series only became part of the Open Movie Project starting with the second episode. In this episode, Koro hunts for food on the other side of a fence and is once again inspired by the Armadillo, but this time to a shocking effect.
7	Cosmos Laundromat	August 10, 2015	Project Gooseberry
On January 10, 2011, Ton Roosendaal announced that the fifth open movie project would be codenamed "Gooseberry" and that its goal would be to produce a feature-length animated film. He speculated that production would begin sometime between 2012 and 2014. The film was to be written and produced by a coalition of international animation studios. The studio lineup was announced on January 28, 2014, and production began soon thereafter. As of March 2014, a moodboard had been constructed and development goals set. The initial ten minute pilot was released on YouTube. It won the SIGGRAPH 2016 Computer Animation Festival Jury's Choice award.
8	Glass Half	October 30, 2015	N/A
Glass Half was released in HD format. This project demonstrates real-time rendering capabilities using OpenGL for 3D cartoon animation. It also marks the end of the fruit naming scheme. Glass Half was financed by the Blender Foundation with proceeds from the Blender Cloud. It is a short, roughly three-minute long comedy in a gibberish language that addresses subjectivity in art.
9	Caminandes 3: Llamigos	January 30, 2016	Part of the Caminandes series
Caminandes is a series of animated short films envisioned by Pablo Vazquez of Argentina. It centers on a llama named Koro in Patagonia and his attempts to overcome various obstacles. The series only became part of the Open Movie Project starting with the second episode. In this episode, Koro meets Oti, a pesky baby magellanic penguin, in an epic battle over tasty red berries during the winter.
10	Agent 327: Operation Barbershop	May 15, 2017	N/A
Agent 327: Operation Barbershop is a three-minute teaser released on May 15, 2017, for a planned full-length animated feature. The three-minute teaser is uploaded to YouTube by the official Blender Studio channel. Co-directed by Colin Levy and Hjalti Hjálmarsson, it is based on the classic Dutch comic series Agent 327. This teaser film also acts as a proof-of-concept to attract funding for the full-length animated feature. Agent 327: Operation Barbershop showcases the latest technology of Cycles engine, the render engine that has been included in Blender since 2011. Assets from this teaser have been released under a Creative Commons license via Blender Cloud.
11	The Daily Dweebs	January 31, 2018	N/A
A short featuring a silly dog
12	Hero	April 16, 2018	2D techniques
Hero is the first open movie project to demonstrate the capabilities of the Grease Pencil, a 2D animation tool in Blender 2.8. It was put on YouTube on April 16, 2018. It has a roughly four-minute runtime, which includes over a minute of "behind-the-scenes" "making-of" footage. It showcases the art of Spanish animator Daniel Martínez Lara.
13	Spring	April 4, 2019	N/A
"Spring is the story of a shepherd girl and her dog, who face ancient spirits to continue the cycle of life. This poetic and visually stunning short film was written and directed by Andy Goralczyk, inspired by his childhood in the mountains of Germany." On October 25, 2017, an animated short film named Spring was announced. Spring was released April 4, 2019. Its purpose was to test Blender 2.8's capabilities before its official release.
14	Coffee Run	May 29, 2020	Rendered in EEVEE
"Fueled by caffeine, a young woman runs [backwards in time] through the bittersweet memories of her past relationship." On May 29, 2020, the open movie Coffee Run was released. It was the first open movie to be rendered in the EEVEE render engine.
15	Sprite Fright	October 29, 2021	N/A
Sprite Fright is set in Britain and draws inspiration from 1980s horror comedy. It is directed by Pixar story artist Mathew Luhn with Hjalti Hjalmarsson. It is about a group of teenagers being attacked and killed by Sprites after they litter the forest. It premiered at Eye Film in the Netherlands on 28 October 2021 and was publicly released on Blender Studio and YouTube on 29 October 2021.
16	Charge	December 15, 2022	N/A
A cinematic short with an emphasis on photo-realism. The short takes place in Iceland and is intended to improve Blender's PBR texturing workflow.
17	Wing It!	September 12, 2023	N/A
A happy-go-lucky dog recklessly commandeers a cat's over-engineered space shuttle.
18	Singularity	May 11, 2026	N/A
Singularity takes place in a distant age of the universe, when the stars and galaxies were young. When an ominous cosmic event swallows a small space critter's home, it must work with other critters and their mysterious celestial watcher to evade extinction.

=== Video games ===
- Yo Frankie! - 2008 video game, based on Big Buck Bunny
- Sintel The Game – 2011 video game
- Dog Walk - 2025 video game
