= Verse protocol =

Verse is a networking protocol allowing real-time communication between computer graphics software. For example, several architects can build a house in the same virtual environment using their own computers, even if they are using different software. If one architect builds a spiral staircase, it instantly appears on the screens of all other users. Verse is designed to use the capacity of one or multiple computers over the Internet: for example, allowing a user with a hand-held computer in Spain to work with the rendering power of a supercomputer in Japan. Its principles are very general, allowing its use in contexts that are advantageous to collaboration such as gaming and visual presentations.

== Uni-Verse ==
The Swedish Royal Institute of Technology (KTH), with several collaborators including the Interactive Institute, set up an EU project called Uni-Verse. The EU Commission granted them nearly SEK 18 million over the next several years to develop a system for graphics, sound, and acoustics using Verse and making it into an open source platform.

== Verse-enabled projects ==
- Blender
- Crystal Space
- Love
