= Cosmos Laundromat =

2015 film directed by Mathieu Auvray

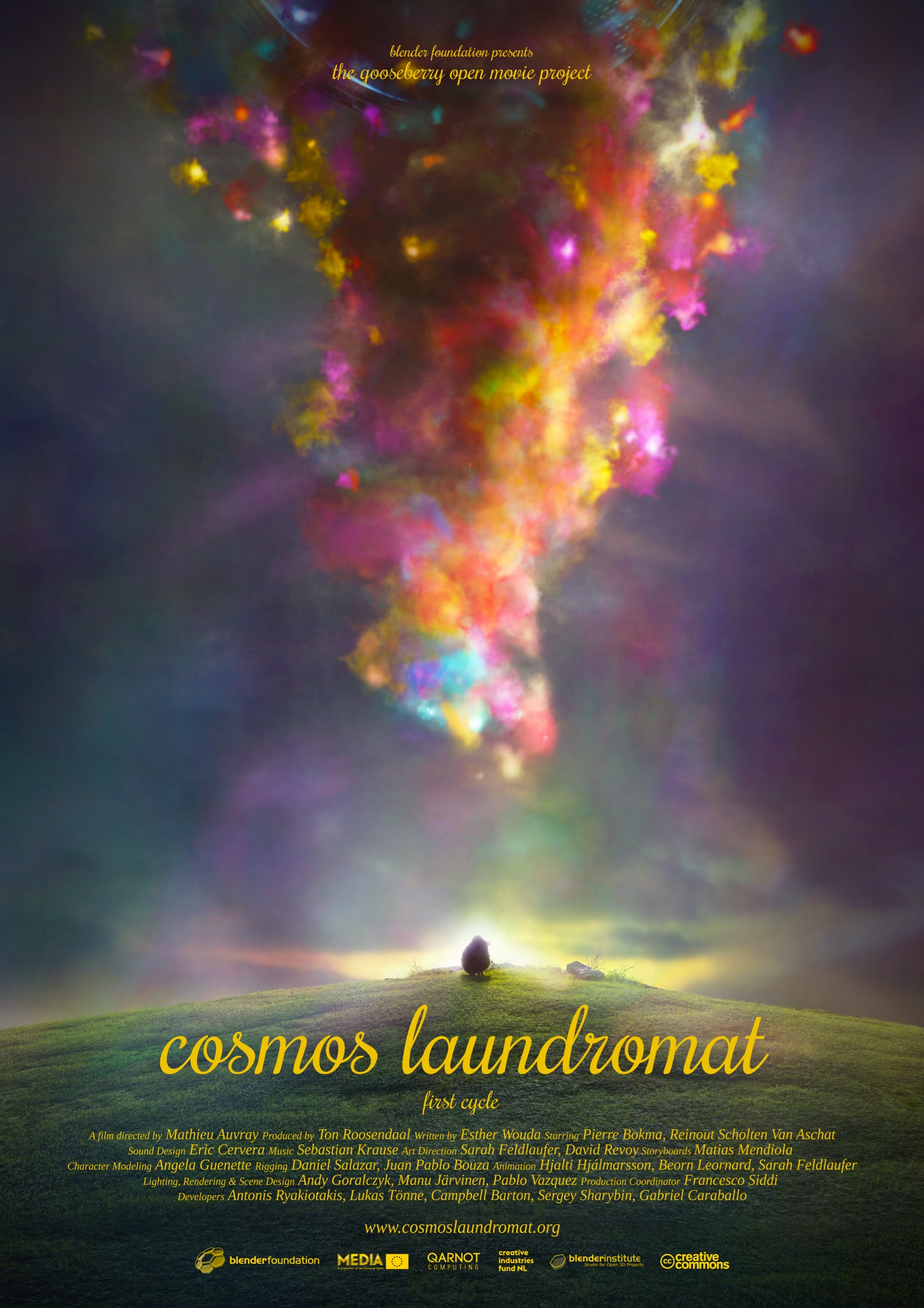
- Film poster
- Directed by: Mathieu Auvray
- Written by: Esther Wouda
- Produced by: Ton Roosendaal
- Starring: Pierre Bokma; Reinout Scholten van Aschat
- Music by: Sebastian Krause
- Layouts by: Sarah Laufer; David Revoy
- Production company: Blender Institute
- Distributed by: Blender Foundation
- Release date: August 10, 2015
- Running time: 12 minutes
- Country: Netherlands
- Language: English
- Budget: 400,000 (euros)

Cosmos Laundromat – First Cycle – Official Blender Foundation release

Cosmos Laundromat: First Cycle, developed under the code name Project Gooseberry, is 2015 animated absurdist science fantasy short film directed by Mathieu Auvray, written by Esther Wouda, and produced by Ton Roosendaal. It is the Blender Institute's 5th "open movie" project, and was made utilizing the Blender software. The film focuses around a depressed and suicidal sheep named Franck who is offered "all the lives he ever wanted" by a mysterious salesman named Victor. On August 10, 2015, it was released to YouTube. The film was originally intended to kickstart a feature-length film. A short film sequel was written and designed but never brought to production. In 2020, Roosendaal announced that the one film would be the total of the project.

The film itself, along with the other Blender Foundation "open movies," was released under the Creative Commons Attribution License.

== Production ==
On January 10, 2010, Ton Roosendaal announced the project. By January 2014, thirteen animation studios from all over the world (including the Blender Institute) were set to make the film. The goals of the film, according to Ton Roosendaal, were to raise the bar for the Blender Institute with the idea of making a feature-length animated film using completely free and open-source software, investigate the use of cloud services for open-source projects, and to create a new business model for the Blender Foundation. In March 2014, concept art and project targets for the project were revealed. A crowdfunding campaign also started around the same period. Through the funding raised for production of the film, the Blender Foundation was able to improve on existing and/or add new features to the Blender software. The film was expected to take 18 months to make, with 60–80 people participating full-time.

== Plot ==
The film starts with a sheep named Franck (voiced by Pierre Bokma) trying to hang himself from a tree branch. The branch that he tried to hang himself from however breaks. The camera zooms out while Franck screams out of frustration to show that he is on a large island. Then, still tied to the broken branch, he walks to the edge of a cliff of the island. He tries to push the branch tied to his neck off, but while attempting to so, a man named Victor (voiced by Reinout Scholten van Aschat) walks up to Franck from behind. He says, "Excuse me," and asks if he "has a moment." Franck replies with, "I'm kind of in the middle of something," of which Victor replies with, "I've come a long way for you Franck," and reveals his name. Victor tries to talk Franck out of suicide and asks for one minute of his time. Eventually Franck decides to give in and lets Victor put a collar around him saying, "This is the best product we have in-store, variable spin-speed, excellent tumble performance in one handy device." A timer goes off and Victor says, "Time flies." Franck is frantically asking what he should do and Victor responds with, "Just stay here." As Victor walks away, he puts a cassette tape in his tape player (which resembles a Sony Walkman) and presses the play button. As music begins to play, the inside of a giant laundry machine appears out of the sky along with a colorful tornado from inside, which Franck runs away from. Other sheep on the island around gather around Victor to watch. Franck eventually gets sucked up into the tornado, and the other sheep watch in a state of awe. Franck wakes up to find out he has been transported to a purple jungle and that he turned into a caterpillar. The camera then zooms out to show that he is in a washing machine inside the titular Cosmos Laundromat. Victor gets out of one of the other washing machines, and as he is about to light up a cigarette, another timer goes off. Victor stops what he was doing and rushes past the camera, thus cutting to a screen displaying, "To be continued."

== Cast ==
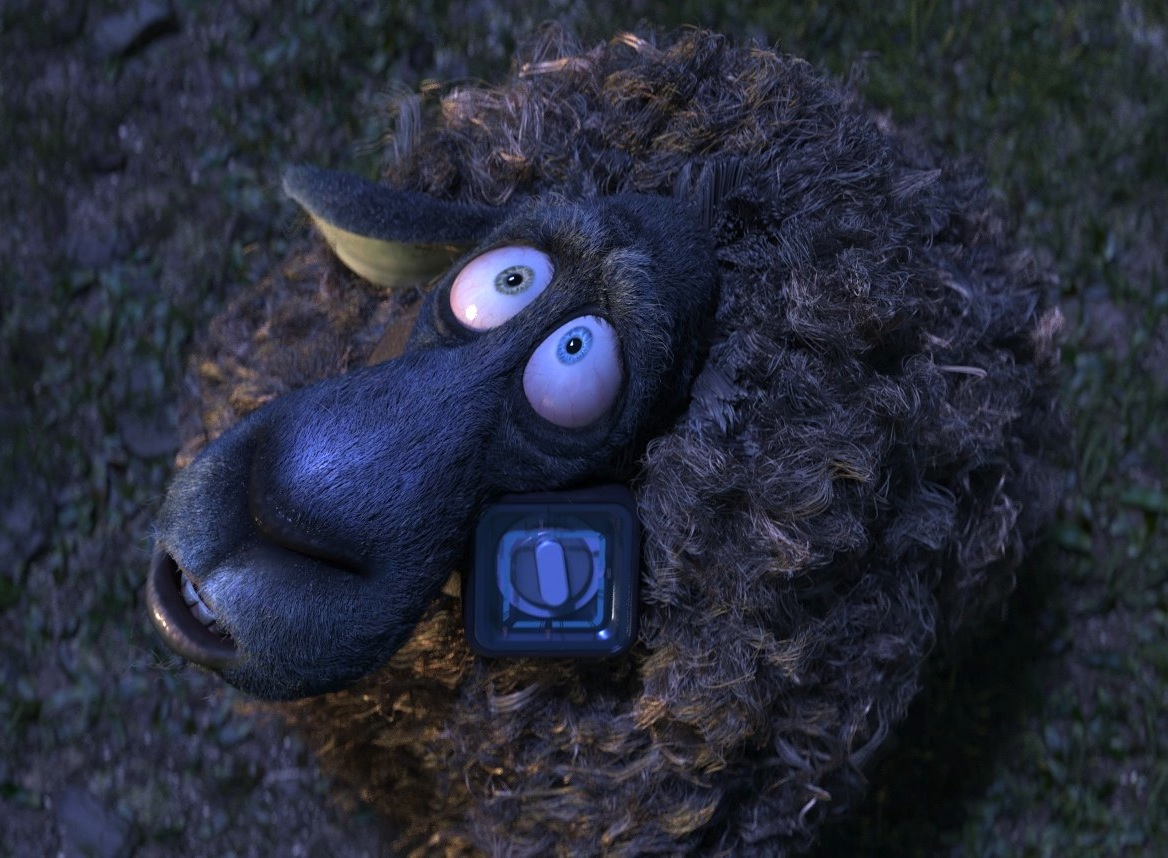
Franck (voiced by Pierre Bokma)

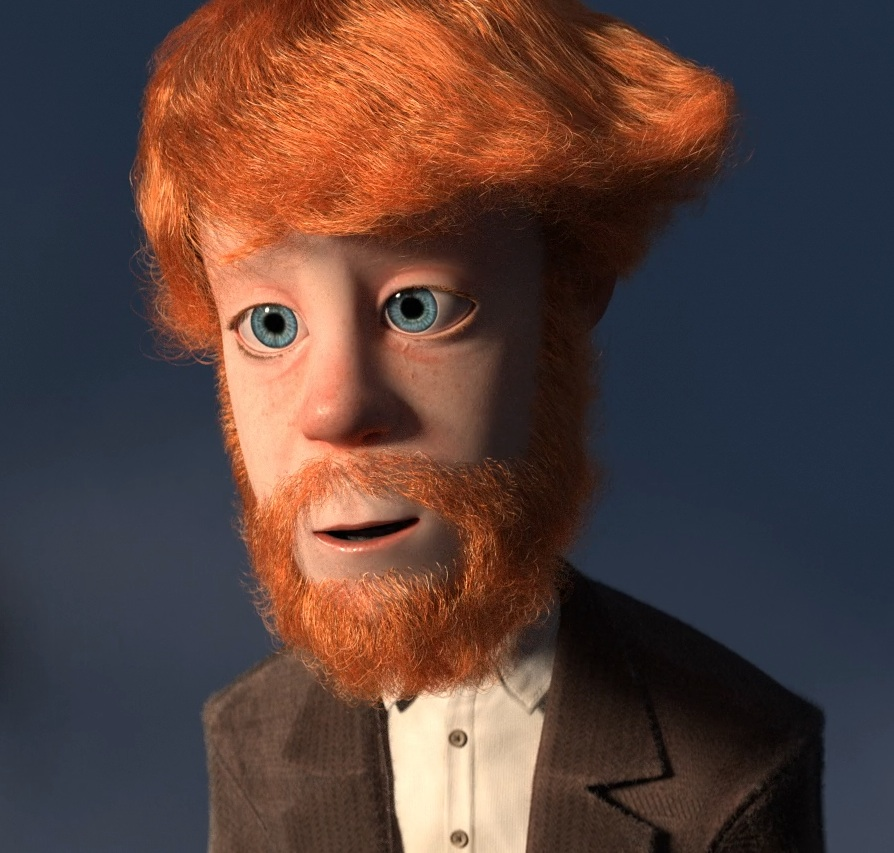
Victor (voiced by Reinout Scholten van Aschat)

The main characters of the film
- Pierre Bokma as Franck, a depressed and suicidal sheep
- Reinout Scholten van Aschat as Victor, a mysterious salesman

== Reception ==
Cosmos Laundromat has received positive reviews from critics and animators alike.

=== Animators ===
At SIGGRAPH 2015, various people from Pixar, Walt Disney Animation Studios, DreamWorks, Industrial Light & Magic and Sony Imageworks praised the film for the storytelling, the character animations and the visuals. However, two main critiques it received were about the beginning scene where Franck tries to hang himself and the use of the word "fuck."

=== Critics ===
Brendan Hesse of Lifehacker praised the film for its HDR effects and animation.

=== Accolades ===
Ceremony	Award	Date of ceremony	Result	Ref(s)
Animago Award & Conference 2015	Jury's Award	October 16, 2015	Won	
2016 Webby Awards	Online Film & Video Animation	May 16, 2016	Nominated	
2016 SIGGRAPH Computer Animation Festival	Jury's Choice Award	July 24–28, 2016	Won	
Animayo 2017	Gran Premio del Jurado (Grand Jury Prize); Mejor cortometraje 3D (Best 3D short film)	May 16, 2017	Won	

== Release ==
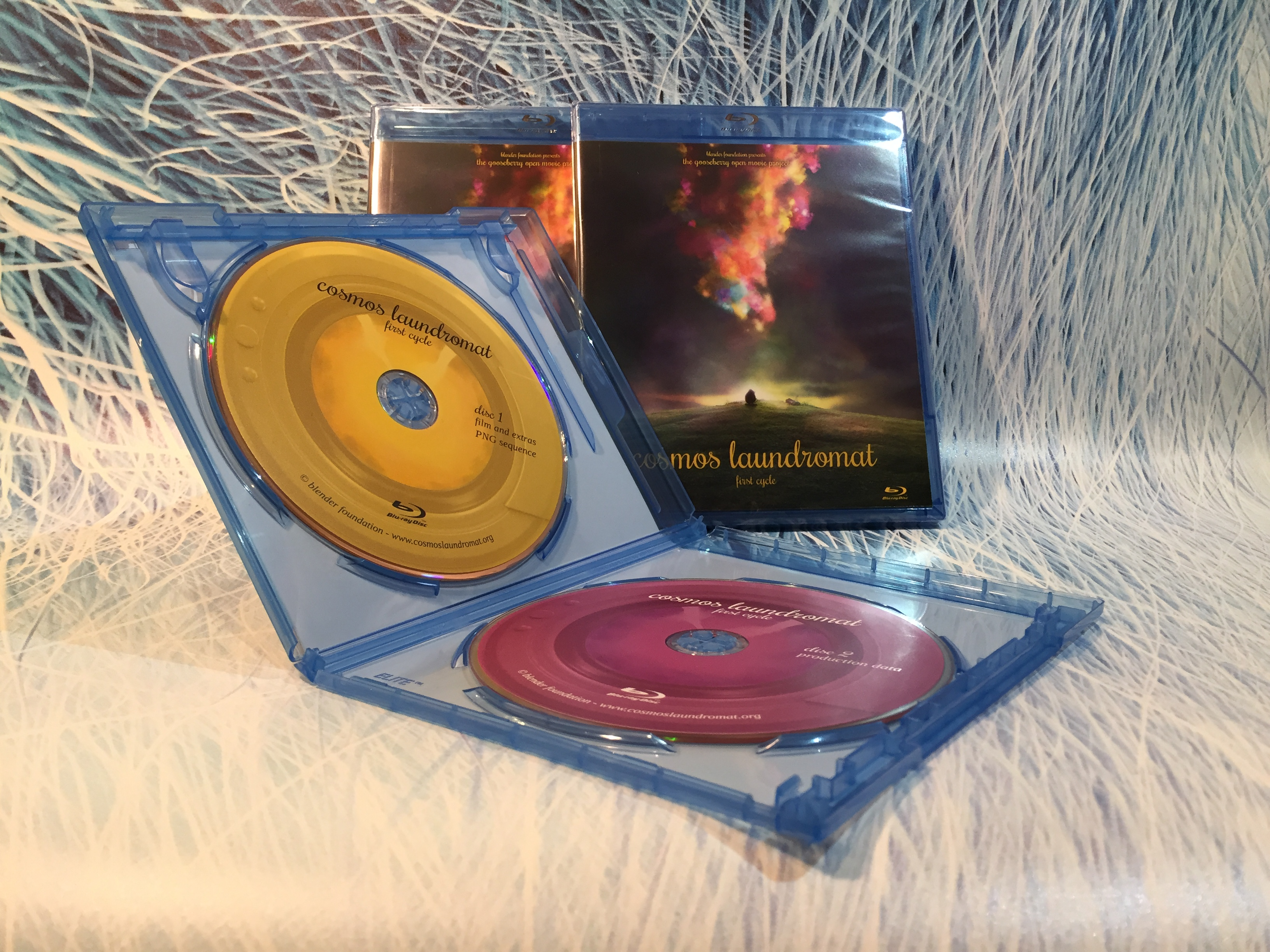
Cosmos Laundromat on Blu-ray

On August 10, 2015, the film was uploaded to the official Blender YouTube channel. On September 9, 2015, the film was made available on DVD and USB data cards; and on October 19, 2015, it was made available on Blu-ray. They all include various featurettes, the production files, project's branch binary, and version 2.76 of the Blender software. On September 24, 2015, the film premiered at the Netherlands Film Festival, and in October 2015, it was shown at the Animago Awards and Conference, where it won the Jury's Award.

== Sequel ==
On August 20, 2015, Ton Roosendaal posted that the second part (which is supposed to take place in the "purple jungle" Franck found himself in) was written, designed, and most of the storyboard was ready. On April 12, 2018, Roosendaal said that they would keep the idea of a sequel open, but said that if they got the necessary amount of funding for a feature film, they would make something different, and just keep Cosmos Laundromat as a "short film" side project.

Roosendaal announced Cosmos Laundromat ep. 2 on October 24, 2019, at the annual Blender Conference, noting that the story was still being fleshed out and that work would begin by the end of the year. However, on May 22, 2020, Roosendaal announced that they were once again dropping the project.
