= Netherlands Media Art Institute =

Former museum and institute in Amsterdam

Coordinates: 52°22′17″N 4°53′04″E

The Netherlands Media Art Institute (NIMk) (Nederlands Instituut voor Mediakunst in Dutch) was an international institution based in Amsterdam focusing on the presentation, research and collection of Media Art.

Previously known as MonteVideo, the institute was founded in 1978 by René Coelho as one of the first Dutch exhibition spaces and production facilities for artists working and experimenting with art and new technologies.

NIMk played a role in exhibiting, disseminating and researching new technologies in media art. Its catalogue comprised more than 2000 works, ranging from installations, video performances, software-based and internet art, from recognised international artists such as: Marina Abramović, Gary Hill, Juan Downey, Dennis Oppenheim, Marcel Odenbach. Also a large collection of Dutch artists' works and documentation of performances could be viewed in its mediatheque, among them are Livinus van de Bundt, Bill Spinhoven, Bert Schutter, Han Hoogerbrugge, Bas Jan Ader, Daniel Brun, Guido van der Werve and Erwin Olaf.

The museum ceased operations on 31 December 2012 due to discontinuation of funding from the Dutch Ministry of Education, Culture and Science. Some of its tasks and collection were absorbed by the LIMA media art platform in Amsterdam.

In front of Netherlands Institute of Media Art - 2010

== Main areas ==
=== Presentation ===
NIMk has 4 exhibitions per year with Dutch and international artists working with video, film, Internet and other technological media. This is to promote new and upcoming artists as well as established artists. The presentation of media art also come in the form of symposiums, screenings and live performances of image and sound. Most events are within NIMks own facilities, but also in collaboration with other institutions and venues.

=== Research ===
NIMk supports artists researching into the use of new media in the visual arts by a programme called The Artist in Residence (AiR). The programme provides a residing artist with a studio, technical support and exhibition equipment to create new work. Some of the former and current artists in residence are : Dave Griffiths, Aymeric Mansoux and Marloes de Valk, Sonia Cillari, Knowbotic Research, Esther Polak, Linda Hilfling, Lilia Perez Romero, Chris Ziegler, Rob Davis & Usman Haque, Blender, Linda Wallace, Simon Yuill, Jaromil, Kelli Dipple, Adam Hyde, Marjorieke Glaudemans & Karen Lancel, Stansfield/Hooykaas.

NIMk also does research in documentation and preservation of media art. One project is the digitisation of video art work in collaboration with the Foundation for the Conservation of Contemporary Art (SBMK) and Virtueel Platform (VP). Between the years 2004 and 2007 NIMk participated in an international research project concerning preservation and documentation of installations called Inside Installations, from 2007 to 2010 it led the European project "Gateways to Archives of Media Art" (GAMA) providing access to a wealth of information about the works of both well-known and emerging artists from European collections of media art.

=== Collection ===
The Mediatheque, here works can be viewed from the catalogue - 2010

NIMk has built up an extensive collection of video and media art for the last 30 years which constitutes one of the largest video art collections in Europe. The video collection consists of a distribution and a documentation collection, which are both available in the Mediatheque at NIMk. The catalogue is published online, with short excerpts of most of the works. This way the NIMk seeks to promote media art to a wider audience.

The distribution collection comprises more than 2000 works; varying form the earliest experiments through recent productions. These works are lend out for a wide range of purposes, like international and national festivals, exhibitions at various art institutions and for educational use. The distribution department presents video art, media art and installations to professionals and they organise and facilitate presentations of works from the collection. NIMk also maintains the collections of the Appel Foundation (De Appel), the former Lijnbaan Center in Rotterdam and the Netherlands Institute for Cultural Heritage (ICN).

== History ==
What was going to become NIMk, started out as MonteVideo, founded in 1978 by René Coelho a former camera man. René Coelho made an exhibition space in his own home as well as equipment and documentation available for artists. In 1983 MonteVideo moved to a bigger space in Amsterdam North and was now showing works of international as well as Dutch artists. The first artist to exhibit was Livinus van de Bundt. Later followed by artists such as Bert Schutter, Bill Viola, Gary Hill and Shelly Silver. MonteVideos collection of contemporary art kept growing into a large collection of works, which was rented out. Another organisation for new media art was founded that year, by Association of Video Artists, called Time Based Arts. For some time MonteVideo and Time Based Arts where competing against each other to get recognition and funding. From 1986 to 1993 Monte Videos government funding was reduced and René Coëlho continued on his own. During this period the exhibition of Dutch media art "Imago" toured worldwide. In the meantime the death of Aart van Barneveld, the director of Time Based Arts, was followed by a lot of conflicts in between the associated artists in Time Based Arts, which almost resulted in the collapse of the organisation. But in 1990 Montevideo and Time based Arts decided to collaborate on a joint art program for Amsterdam cable TV called channel zero. The two organisations ended up merging in 1993 and became what it is today, Netherlands Media Art Institute. The merged Institute moved in 1994 to Spuistraat and in 1997 it moved to its current location on Keizersgracht in Amsterdam.
