= Elephants Dream =

2006 Dutch animated short film

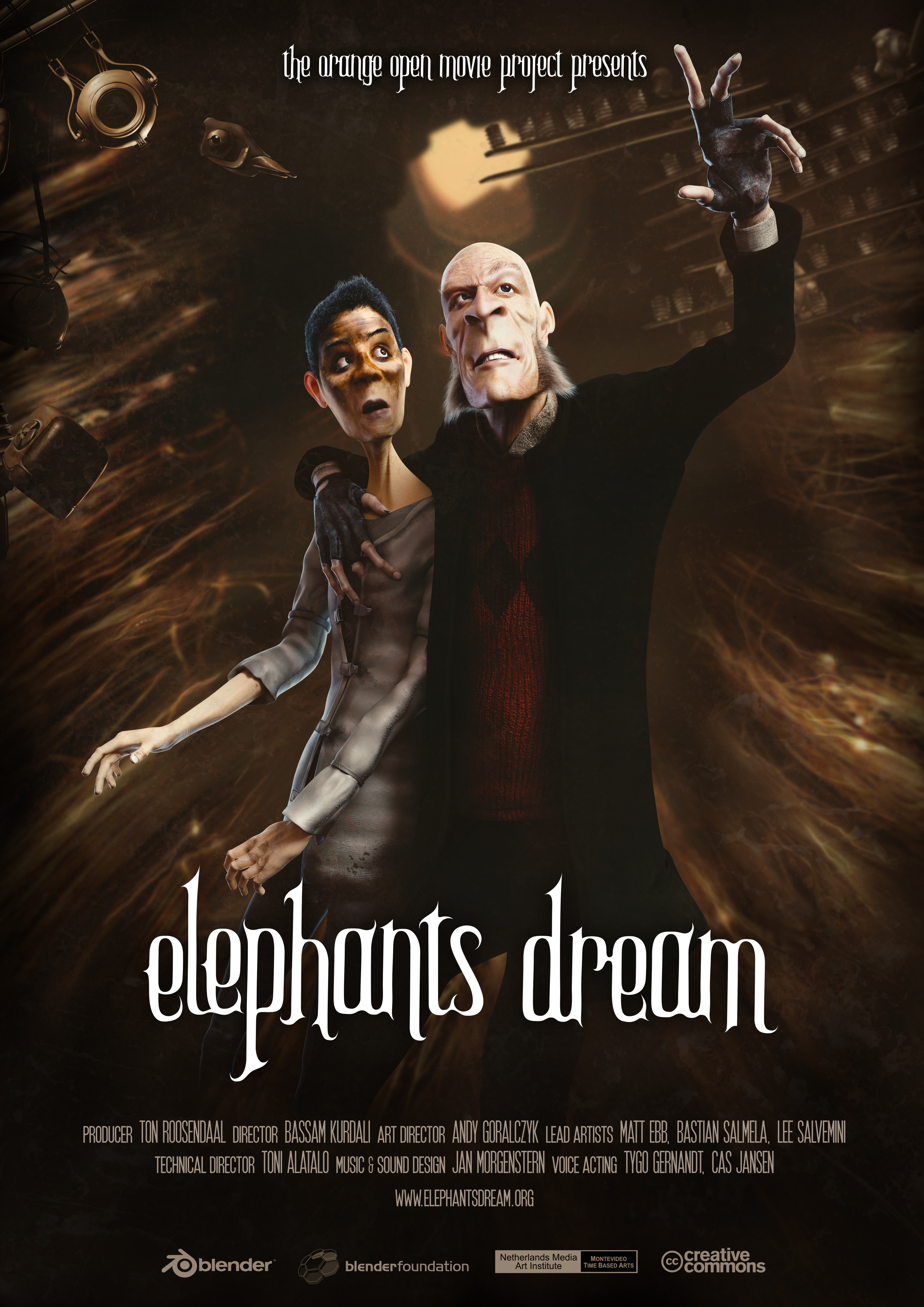
- Film poster
- Directed by: Bassam Kurdali
- Screenplay by: Pepijn Zwanenberg
- Story by: Andreas Goralczyk; Bassam Kurdali; Ton Roosendaal
- Produced by: Ton Roosendaal
- Starring: Cas Jansen; Tygo Gernandt
- Music by: Jan Morgenstern
- Animation by: Toni Alatalo; Andreas Goralczyk; Matt Ebb; Bastian Salmela; Lee Salvemini; Enrico Valenza; Roland Hess; Robert Ives; Joeri Kassenaar
- Production companies: Blender Foundation; Netherlands Institute for Media Art / Montevideo TBA; The Orange Open Movie Project
- Distributed by: Blender Foundation
- Release date: 24 March 2006
- Running time: 9 minutes
- Country: Netherlands
- Language: English
- Budget: €120,000

Elephants Dream (code-named Project Orange during production and originally titled Machina) is a 2006 Dutch animated experimental science fantasy short film produced by Blender Foundation using, almost exclusively, free and open-source software. The film is English-language and includes subtitles in over 30 languages.

== Plot ==
Elephants Dream full film

An old man, Proog, guides the young Emo through a giant surreal machine, in which the rooms have no clear transition to each other. After Proog saves Emo from flying plugs in a room consisting of a gigantic telephone switchboard, they run through a dark room filled with electrical cables and flee from a flock of bird-like robots. In the next room, Emo is tempted to answer a ringing phone, but Proog stops him and reveals a trap. The room is also occupied by a robot resembling a self-operating typewriter, which Emo appears to laugh at.

The next room is a large abyss from which metal supports appear from below; Proog nimbly dances across the abyss on the supports, while Emo casually walks along and does not seem to notice the stilts supporting him. Proog explains to Emo that the machine is like clockwork and could destroy them both if one wrong move is made. The two enter an elevator that is catapulted through a series of apertures by a pair of mechanical slats. Proog instructs Emo to close his eyes as they ascend to an empty dark void. Proog asks Emo what he sees, and is pleased by Emo's reply that he sees nothing as they plunge rapidly into the next room. A projector creates an image of a door from which music emanates. Emo asks to go through the door, but Proog insists that it is unsafe, and presses a button within his cane to enclose them both in a smaller room.

Proog asks Emo why he fails to recognize the beauty and perfection of the machine, to which Emo responds that the machine does not exist. Frustrated, Proog slaps Emo across the face, pushing the startled Emo to walk away. Emo mockingly imitates Proog's earlier tour to demonstrate the machine's absurdity and manifests the twisted versions of the Hanging Gardens of Babylon (in the form of mechanical roots) and the Colossus of Rhodes (in the form of gigantic hands), which threaten to destroy Proog's constructed world. Proog knocks Emo unconscious with his cane and causes his creations to disappear, Proog desperately asserts to Emo that the machine exists.

== Production ==
In May 2005, Ton Roosendaal announced the project. The primary piece of software used to create the film was Blender; other programs used in production include DrQueue, Inkscape, Seashore, Twisted, Verse, CinePaint, GIMP, OpenEXR, Reaktor, Subversion, Python, Ubuntu, GNOME, and KDE. All of the software, except Reaktor, was free and open-source. The project was jointly funded by the Blender Foundation and the Netherlands Media Art Institute. The Foundation raised much of the funding for the project by selling pre-orders of the DVD. Production began in September 2005, under the code-name Orange by a team of seven artists and animators from around the world. It was later named Machina, and then finally renamed to Elephants Dream in reference to a Dutch tradition whereby parents might abruptly end children's bedtime stories with the introduction of a sneezing elephant. The primary purpose of the project was to field test, develop and showcase the capabilities of Blender, demonstrating what can be done with the software in organizing and producing quality content for films. During the film's development, several new features (such as an integrated node-based compositor, hair and fur rendering, rewritten animation system and render pipeline, and many workflow tweaks and upgrades) were added to Blender specifically for the project. The bulk of computer processing power for rendering the film was donated by the BSU Xseed, a 2.1 TFLOPS Apple Xserve G5-based supercomputing cluster at Bowie State University. It reportedly took 125 days to render, consuming up to 2.8GB of memory for each frame. Elephants Dream was released on March 24, 2006. The film itself, along with the other Blender Foundation “open movies,” was released under the Creative Commons Attribution License, so that viewers may learn from it and use it as long as proper attribution is given.

Bassam Kurdali, the director, explained the plot of the film:

"The story is very simple—I'm not sure you can call it a complete story even—It is about how people create ideas/stories/fictions/social realities and communicate them or impose them on others. Thus Proog has created (in his head) the concept of a special place/machine, that he tries to "show" to Emo. When Emo doesn't accept his story, Proog becomes desperate and hits him. It's a parable of human relationships really—You can substitute many ideas (money, religion, social institutions, property) instead of Proog's machine—the story doesn't say that creating ideas is bad, just hints that it is better to share ideas than force them on others. There are lots of little clues/hints about this in the movie—many little things have a meaning—but we're not very "tight" with it, because we are hoping people will have their own ideas about the story, and make a new version of the movie. In this way (and others) we tie the story of the movie with the "open movie" idea."

== Accolades ==
Elephants Dream received the award for "Best Short Film" at the first European 3D Film Festival in 2010. In 2008, Elephants Dream was included in the Museum of Modern Art (MoMA)'s Design and the Elastic Mind exhibit.

== Release ==
On May 18, 2006, the film was released for as a direct download and via BitTorrent on the Official Orange Project website, along with all of the production files.

=== DVD ===
Everyone who pre-ordered the DVD before a certain time could have their name listed in the film's credits. The DVD set includes the NTSC and PAL versions on separate discs, a computer file of an HD version, and all the production files.

=== Stereoscopic release ===
In 2010, four years after the original release, the film was entirely re-rendered in stereoscopic 3D by Wolfgang Draxinger. The project was announced to the public in mid-September on BlenderNation, and premiered at the 2010 Blender Conference.

The stereoscopic version was rendered in Digital Cinema Package (DCP) 2K flat resolution, with a slightly wider aspect format which required adjustment of the camera lens parameter in every shot. Many scenes in the original production files used flat 2D matte paintings which were integrated into the rendered images during the compositing phase. For the 3D production each matte painting had to be manipulated or entirely recreated into versions for each eye.

Draxinger implemented a number of stereoscopic features in Blender to aid in the stereoscopic production process. However, these features were never merged into official versions of the Blender software.
