= Yo Frankie! =

2008 open-source computer game

- Logo
- Developer: Blender Institute
- Series: Big Buck Bunny
- Engine: Blender Game Engine and Crystal Space
- Platforms: Linux, macOS and Microsoft Windows
- Release: November 14, 2008
- Genre: Platform
- Mode: Single-player

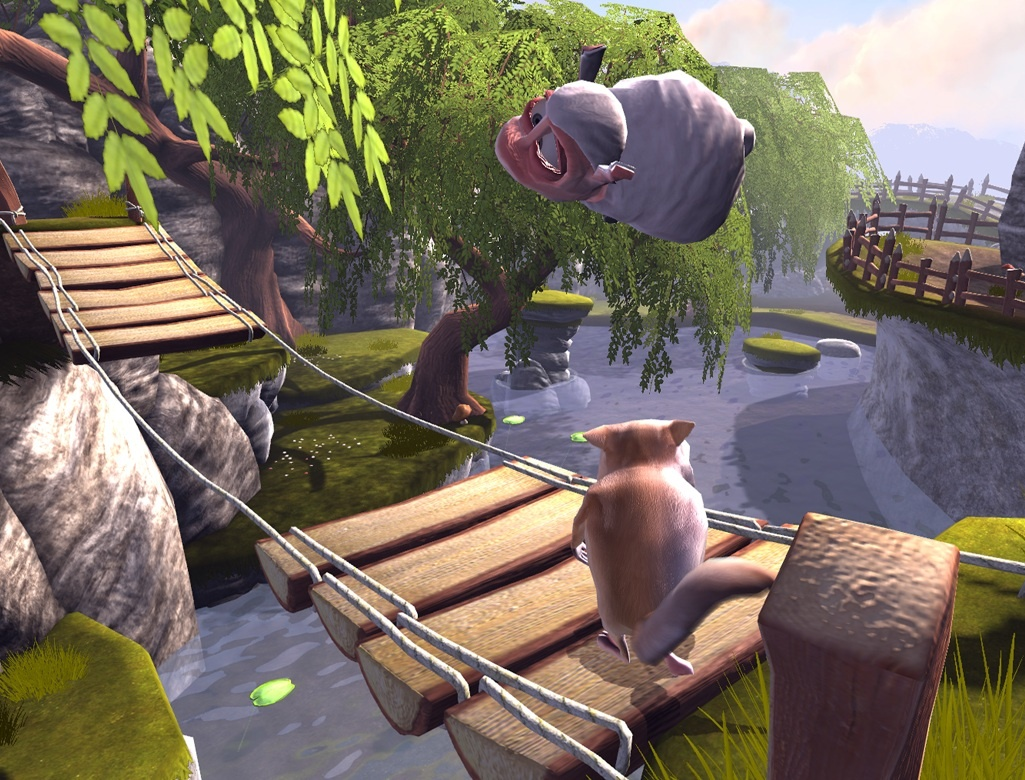
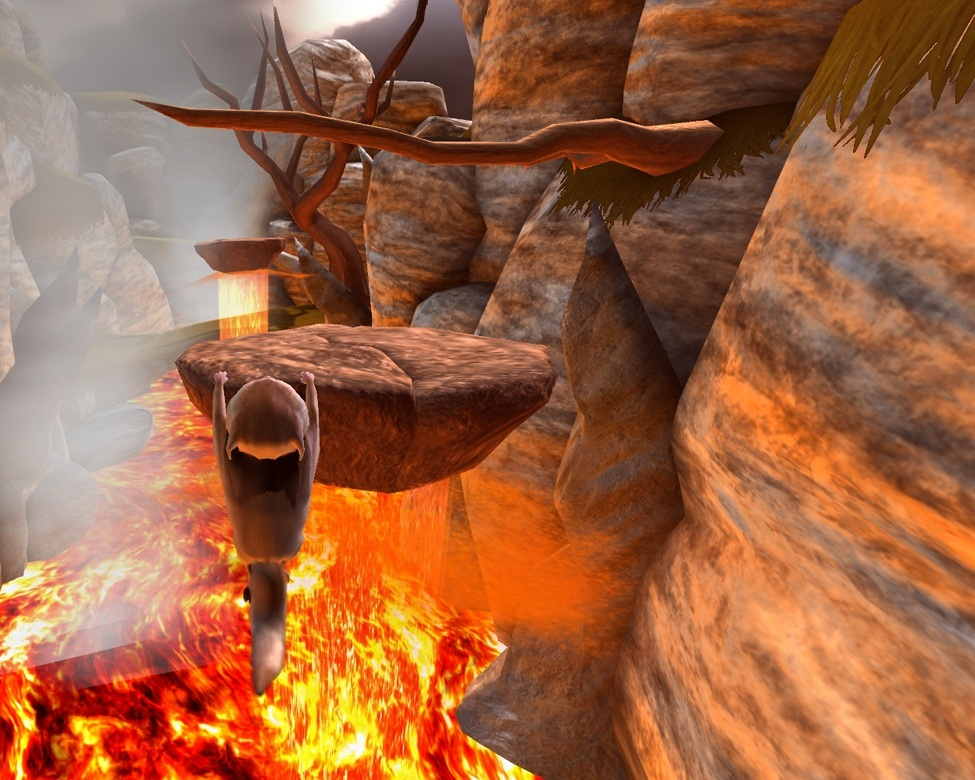
Screenshots of Yo Frankie!, running on the Blender Game Engine, featuring Frank the flying squirrel.

Yo Frankie! is an open source video game made by the Blender Institute, part of the Blender Foundation, released in November 2008. It is based on the universe and characters of the free film produced earlier in 2008 by the Blender Institute, Big Buck Bunny. Like the Blender Institute's previous open film projects, the game is made using free software. Yo Frankie! runs on any platform that runs Blender and Crystal Space, including Linux, macOS and Microsoft Windows.

== Plot ==
In the game, players assume the role of Frank, the flying squirrel who was the antagonist of the film Big Buck Bunny, or Momo, a monkey created especially for this game.

== History ==
=== Development ===
The project started February 1, 2008, and development was completed at the end of July. Due to technical delays, the actual DVD release date was postponed to November 14.

The game is licensed under either the GNU GPL or LGPL, with all content being licensed under Creative Commons license Attribution 3.0.

=== Release ===
Since December 2008, the game is available to download.

There are two versions of the game on the DVD, one with the Blender Game Engine, and a version with Crystal Space. The Blender Game Engine version of the game is titled "A Furry Vendetta", while the Crystal Space version is titled "Furry Funny Frankie". Though some of the assets for making the levels and the characters are shared, the gameplay differs between versions.

== Technology ==
As with previous "open" movie projects, the game is partly designed to promote the open source modeling and animation tool Blender. The modeling, animation and level design were done in Blender. The game itself is rendered with both Blender's internal game engine and the Crystal Space 3D engine, using Python as a scripting language.

The initial decision to use Crystal Space over Blender's own built-in Game Engine was due to the perceived need to create a more "serious" game platform. The development team later partly reversed this decision, by making a new version of the game playable on the Blender Game Engine. This allows artists and level designers a more rapid workflow than rebuilding for the Crystal Space engine on every change (the Blender Game Engine only takes about 2–5 seconds to export, while in Crystal Space, this can take up to a minute).

== Reception ==
The game was noted by the gaming press.

== See also ==
- List of open source games
