= BVH =

BVH is a three letter acronym that can stand for:

- Biovision Hierarchy file format
- Bounding volume hierarchy
- Baron von Hack
- Bahawal Victoria Hospital located in Bahawalpur Pakistan
- Buried Via Holes a PCB technology
- Blackpool Victoria Hospital located in Blackpool, Lancashire
- Vilhena Airport, IATA code BVH
