= MB-Lab =

Plug-in for Blender

ManuelbastioniLAB
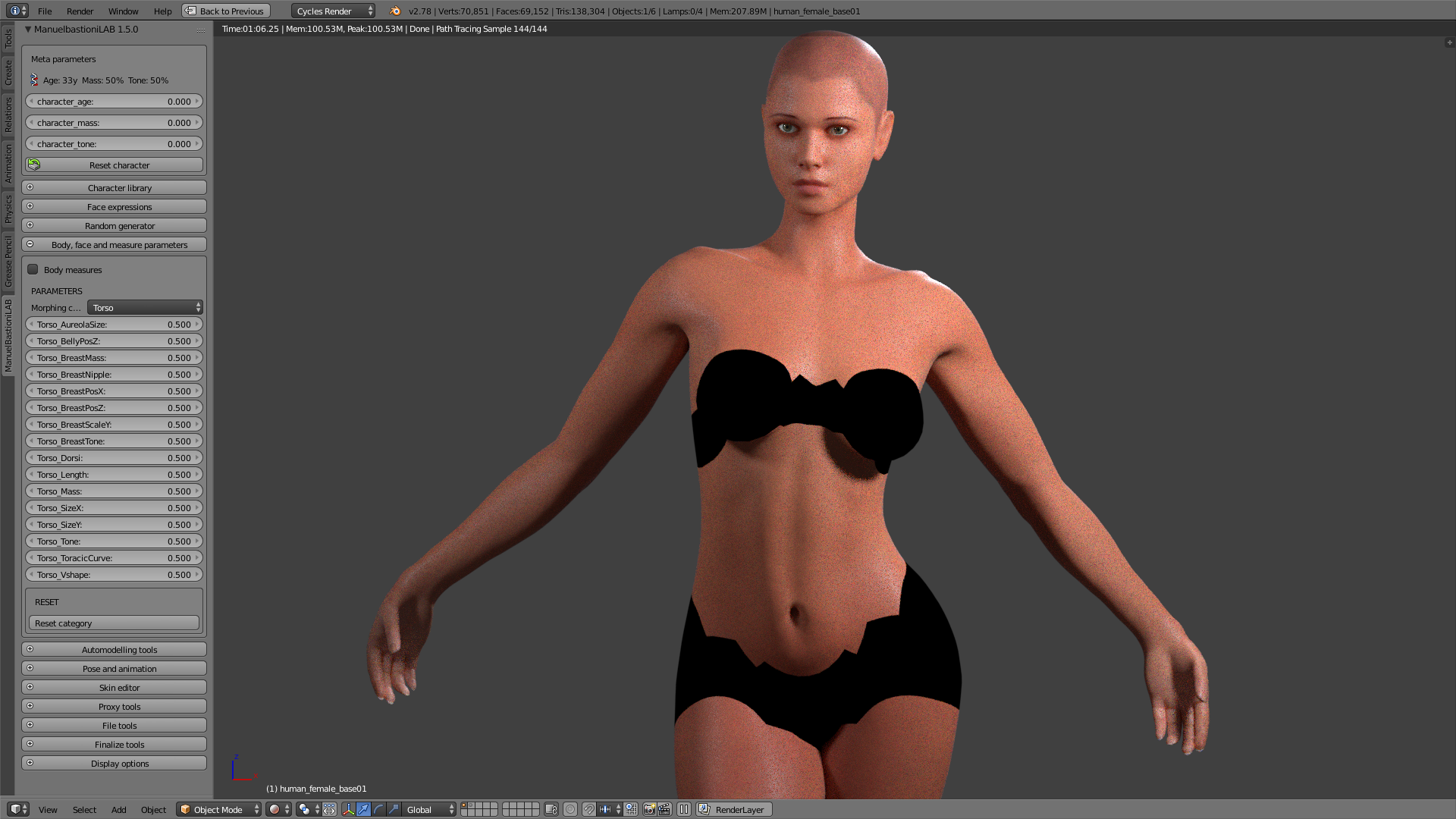
- Graphical interface of ManuelbastioniLAB, integrated in Blender.
- Developer(s): Manuel Bastioni
- Initial release: January 28, 2016
- Stable release: Version 1.8.0 / March 6, 2024
- Repository: github.com/animate1978/MB-Lab
- Written in: Python
- Operating system: Windows, Linux, Mac OS X
- License: AGPL GPL
- Website: mb-lab-community.github.io/MB-Lab.github.io/

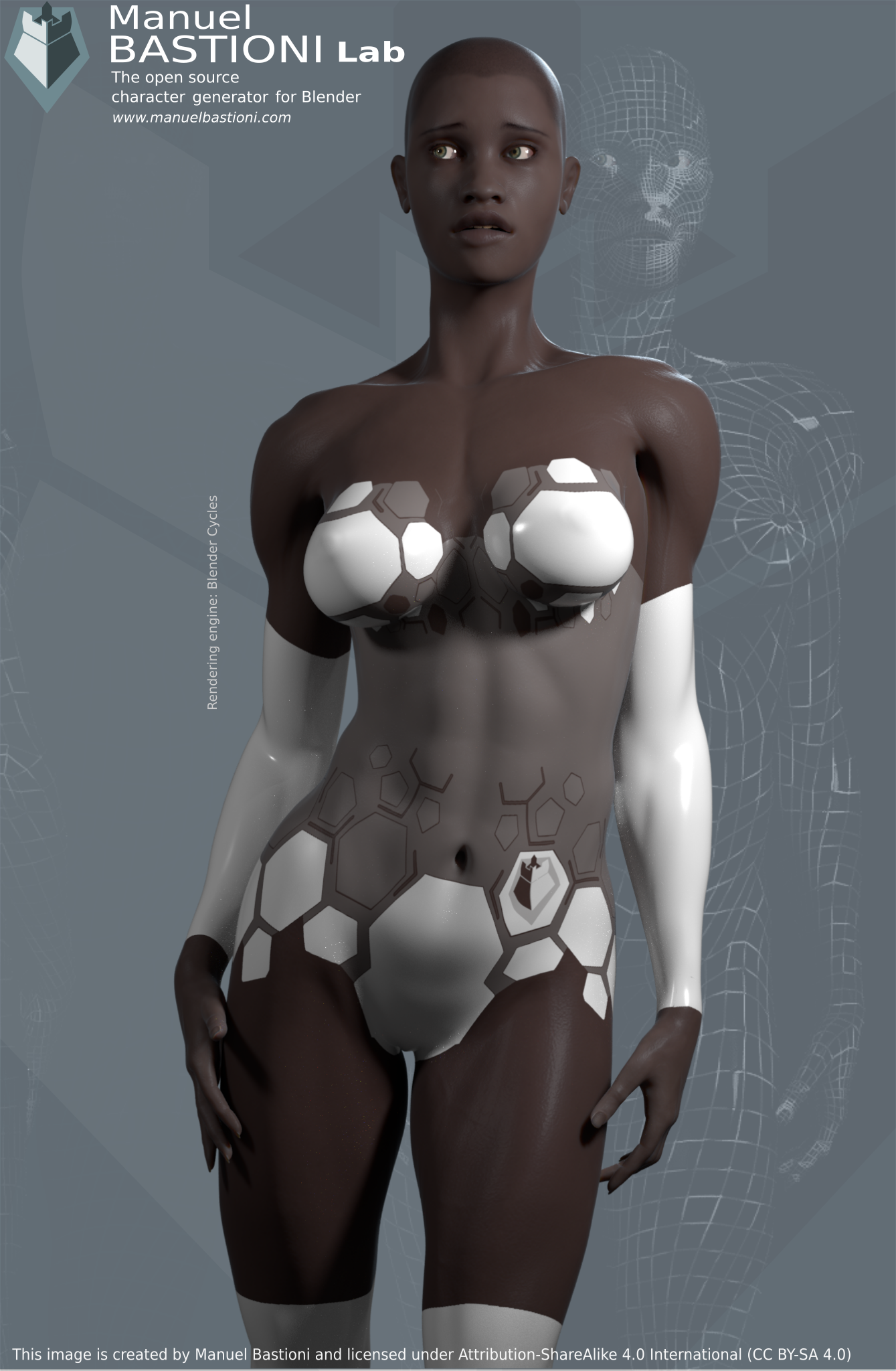
3d character modelled in Blender with the plug-in ManuelbastioniLAB 1.5.0

MB-Lab (previously ManuelbastioniLAB) is a free and open-source plug-in for Blender for the parametric 3D modeling of photorealistic humanoid characters.

It was developed by the artist and programmer Manuel Bastioni, (Note: Active in Open Source since 1999. Coauthor of "The Official Blender 2.3 guide, the open 3D creation suite" with chapter "From Blender to YafRay Using YableX". Founder of MakeHuman project, that received in 2004 the Suzanne Award for the best Python script for Blender. He left the MakeHuman project in 2016) and was based on his over 15 year experience of 3D graphic projects.

Bastioni withdrew support for the project but it has continued as a community project under the MB-Lab name.

== Graphical interface and usability ==
The plugin is completely integrated in Blender. The GUI is designed to be self-explanatory and intuitive and when possible the features are designed to work with one click.

Over 90% of the character is defined with only three sliders that control age (from 18 to 80 y.o.), body mass and body tone. The character is finished with other lab tools for body and face details, poses, skin and eye shaders, animation, poses, proxy, etc.

== Technology ==
The software is designed as a laboratory in constant evolution and includes both consolidated algorithms as the 3D morphing and experimental technologies, as the fuzzy mathematics used to handle the relations between human parameters, the non-linear interpolation used to define the age, mass and tone, the auto-modelling engine based on body proportions and the expert system used to recognize the bones in motion capture skeletons.

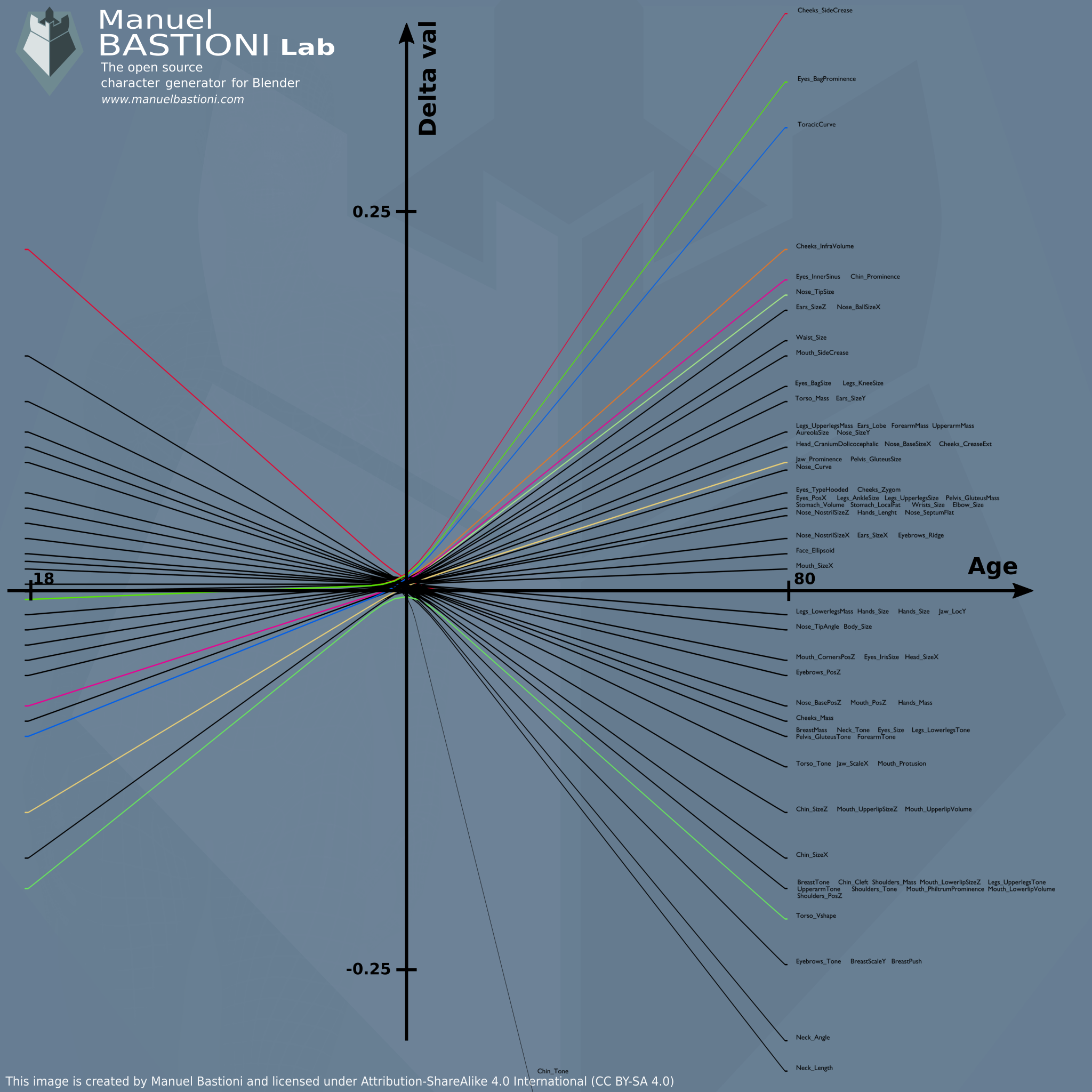
The graph of non-linear functions used in the algo of age metaparameter. The vertical axis represents the delta value to add to the average character. The horizontal axis represents the age from 18 to 80 years old.

The software is written in Python and works on all the platforms supported by Blender: Windows, macOS and Linux.

All the characters use the same standard skeleton, so the poses and animation can be easily moved from a character to another.

Most of the data distributed in the package is stored using the standard json syntax.

== License ==
ManuelbastioniLAB is completely open source, released under standard licenses of the Free Software Foundation.

- Code: All files written in Python are released under GNU General Public License 3.
- Data: All data files released in the ManuelbastioniLAB package are released under GNU Affero General Public License 3.

The characters generated with ManuelbastioniLAB are released under the GNU Affero General Public License 3 (as derivative of AGPL'd data, meshes, textures etc.)

== Anatomy and mesh topology of 3D human models ==
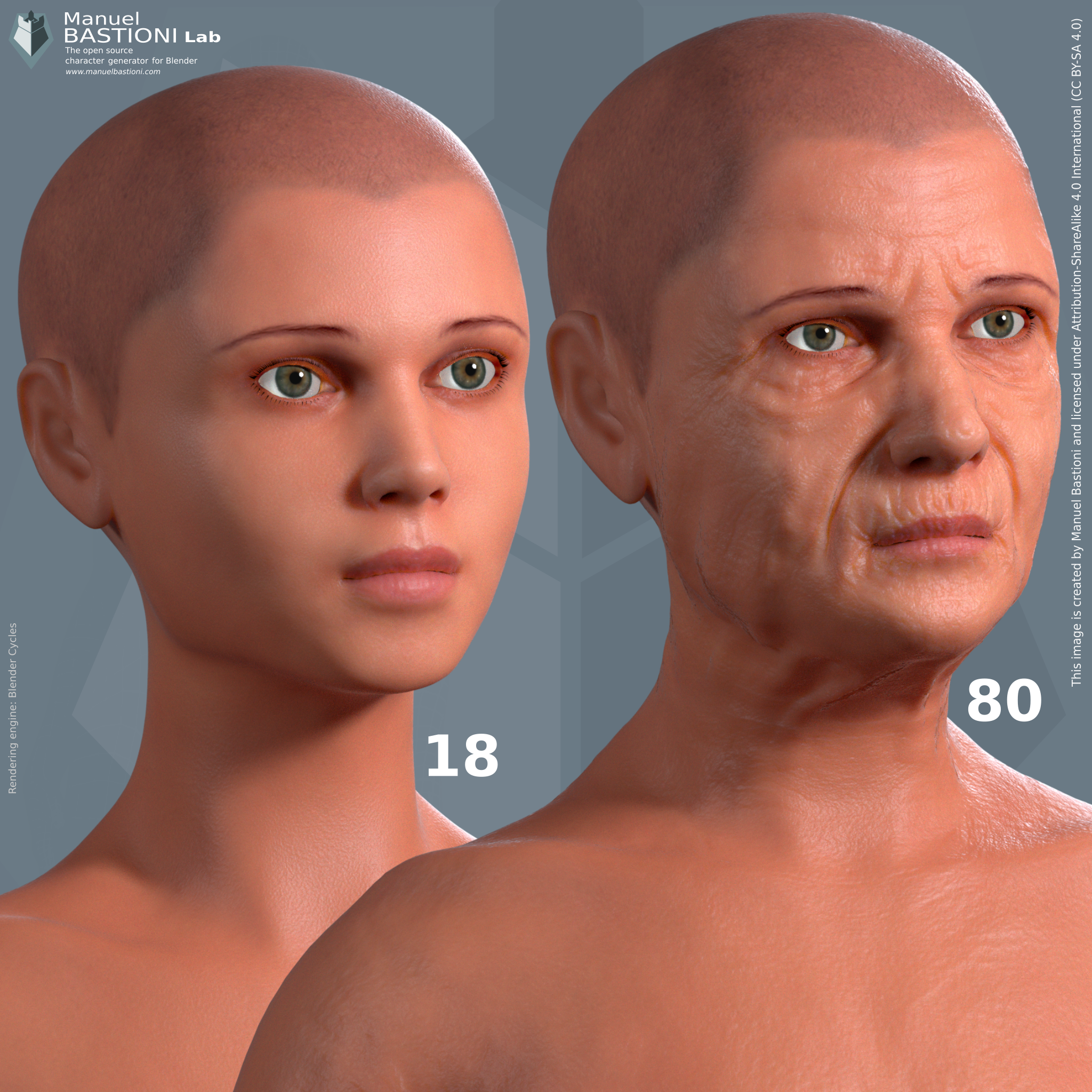
A comparison between the results of the age algorithm. The image also shows the skin shader and the wrinkle map that is automatically created by the ManuelbastioniLAB.

ManuelbastionLAB provides two different base meshes for male and female models. Each model respects the fundamental requisites of a professional mesh, as defined by the author:

- Optimization for subdivision surfaces.
- No triangles.
- Edge loops designed for deformation during poses and animation.
- The topology permits to model the main features of bodies and faces.
- Minimal use of poles.
- Human readable topology.
- Sculpting-friendly topology. (Note: Designed to be optimally sculpted with Blender, Mudbox, Zbrush, etc.)

The base humans are modelled after accurate studies of anatomy and anthropology. The lab 1.5.0 provides about 470 morphs for each human character, designed to parametrically describe most of the anatomical range in human bodies, faces and expressions. Genitalia are not present.

== Anthropology and phenotypes ==
Concerning ManuelbastionLAB, the word phenotype is intended with the following meaning:

A "phenotype" defines merely the physical appearance of a class of characters, it is not related to politics, culture, language and history. It's used to describe the variations of human traits in relation to the evolution in a specific geographical area. ManuelbastioniLAB supports most of the common human phenotypes to the extent of volumetric modelling features.

The lab provides three main classes of humans: Caucasian, Asian and Afro. For each class there is a specific set of phenotypes. Each phenotype can be loaded from the library and used as base for a custom character, or mixed with another phenotype. The available phenotypes are:

- Afro phenotypes: Afromediterranean, Afroasian, Aboriginal, African.
- Asian phenotypes: Central Asian, North Asian, East Asian, South Asian, Central American, North American.
- Caucasian phenotypes: Central European, Afrocaucasian, East European, North European, Euromediterranean, Euroartic, North West European, West Asian.

== Non-human models: Anime, Elves, etc ==
While the lab is aimed to create realistic 3d human beings based on a scientific description of their parameters, the same technology can be successfully applied to non-human characters, like fantasy creatures.

The version 1.5.0 of the lab supports three variety of anime characters: classic shojo, modern shojo and "realistic style" anime. There are also male and female elves and male dwarf. Each model has a separate set of morphs to create millions of variations.

Concerning the creation of fantasy characters, the lab supports some extra parameters for humans too, like pointed ears, special teeth, etc..

== Comparisons ==
While MakeHuman has similar characteristics to MB-Lab, the former is a stand-alone application and requires export and import to Blender which is not necessary with MB-Lab.

== Current stage of development ==
The project was discontinued abruptly by Bastioni, after release 1.6.1a, which was not compatible with Blender 2.80. Bart Veldhhuzien indicates Bastioni attempted unsuccessfully to raise funds, and then chose to move on, quoting Bastioni as saying: "I’m sorry, I did my best, but I cannot continue the development of the lab. I will use Blender as artist, since Blender and its community are part of my life."; and "I realized that the lab community size is not enough to support a so expensive project".

In December 2018, a new repository, based on Bastioni's last version (1.6.1a), aiming at Blender 2.80 compatibility, was opened on GitHub with the project name MB-Lab.

New community based versions are available on GitHub supporting Blender 2.79 and 2.80.

== See also ==
- Blender (software), the underlying base 3D software
- MakeHuman, a related software for creation of 3D characters
