= Alike (film) =

- Directed by: Daniel Martínez Lara; Rafa Cano Mendéz
- Produced by: Daniel Martínez Lara; Nicolás Matji
- Music by: Oscar Araujo
- Production company: Pepe School Land
- Release dates: July 8, 2015 (Mundos Digitales); December 13, 2016 (Online)
- Running time: 8 minutes
- Country: Spain

Alike is a 2015 animated short film directed by Daniel Martínez Lara and Rafa Cano Méndez. The animation production took 5 years to complete along with the help of a ex-animation student using the free 3D animation application, Blender. The animated short is a story of the relationship of a father and his son who live in a society "where order and work ethic literally choke the colour and creativity out of its inhabitants".

== Plot ==
The story set in a bleak and colourless city where creativity is no longer present within the environment or the inhabitants. However, it is only the two main characters, the father, Copi and his son, Paste, who have colours. In the beginning, Copi gets ready for work and prepares Paste for school.

On the way, the son discovers a coloured character who is a violinist performing in a park, At the end of the day, the dad awaits his son to finish school and embraces him which then regains his colour back.

As the days go by of the same routine, the teacher forces Paste to be less creative at school which makes the two of them unhappy resulting both of them losing their colour. It is until one day the father tries to make his son happy by visiting the violinist at the park. However, he is no longer there. Instead, the father stands up in the park and mimes the performance of the violinist and brings happiness to his son and himself.

== Production ==
In 2010, Martinez and Cano started the project with a budget over €60,000 with using their own technology and savings supported by producer Nico Matji. Rather than hiring professional animators from big budget studios, the two directors recruited the help of ex animation students from 'Pepe-school-Land' which is an academy where Lara taught. Due to the lack of resources, the production used Blender since it was free. When the animation was completed in 2015, it was featured in film festivals across world, but was on the condition that it must not be available on the internet.

== Release and reception ==
In 2016, Alike received the Goya Award for best animated short film. Although few people watched the film, both directors decided to upload their project online to give it greater exposure. Since its launch on the internet, the video's popularity grew exponentially being passed on through Vimeo, Twitter and Facebook as well as amassing over 10 million views on YouTube.
