= Vertex painting =

In 3D computer graphics software, vertex painting refers to interactive editing tools for modifying vertex attributes directly on a 3D polygon mesh, using painting tools similar to any digital painting application but working in a 3D viewport on a perspective view of a rotated model. It is similar to a 3D paint tool but operates specifically to vertex data rather than texture maps.

It is most often used for modifying weight maps for skeletal animation, to tweak the influence of individual bones when deforming surfaces around joints.

== Examples of support ==
- Blender
- 3ds Max
- Maya
- Adobe Substance
