= List of motion and gesture file formats =

The use of gesture and motion takes more and more importance with the development of gesture controllers, haptic systems, motion capture systems, etc., on the one hand, and with the need of allowing virtual reality systems to inter-communicate through control data. Motion and gesture file formats are widely used today in many applications that deal with motion and gesture signal. It is the case in domains like motion capture, character animation, gesture analysis, biomechanics, musical gesture interfaces, virtual surgery. Those formats are low-level formats, i.e. formats close to the signal produced by the capture system.

== Existing formats that encode gesture and motion ==
=== BVA and BVH file formats ===
BVH stands for Biovision Hierarchical Data, which was developed by a motion capture company called Biovision. The BVA format (also developed by Biovision) is an older format which was the precursor to BVH. The BVH format is mainly used as a standard representation of movements in the animation of humanoid structures. It is currently one of the most popular motion data formats and has been widely adopted by the animation community (probably because of its simple specifications).

=== MNM file format ===
This file format allows renaming the segments of a BVH file to match the convention used in Autodesk 3D Studio Max. The name defined by the user is associated to the predefined label for the biped segment. eg. Humerus = L UpperArm

This file format also allows renaming the markers of a CSM file to match the convention used in Autodesk 3D Studio Max. A name defined by the user is associated to the predefined label expected by Character Studio. eg. LeftShoulder = LSHO

=== MBX file format ===
The MBX format is a binary hierarchical skeletal format that is exclusive to the Noitom Perception Neuron motion capture system. Files can be loaded into the Noitom Axis Studio software and then exported to BVH and other formats from their software.

=== MVNX format ===
The MVNX format is a human-readable open XML based format for storing Xsens MVN motion capture data. The format contains the 3D positions and orientations of all segments captured with Xsens MVN. In addition, the format includes several other variables to be exported such as joint angles, segment velocity and free acceleration, center of mass trajectory and calibrated sensor data of the individual motion trackers. MVNX data can also be imported into leading software programs including MATLAB and Excel.

=== ASK/SDL file format ===
The format is a variant of the BVH file format developed by Biovision. The ASK file (Alias Skeleton) only contain information concerning the skeleton and, as a result, does not contain any information about the channels or the movement. The offset coordinates are absolute, unlike the BVH in which they are relative. The SDL file associated to the ASK file contains the data of the movement but it can contain much other information concerning the scene than the very samples of the movement.

=== AOA file format ===
Adaptative Optics is a company dedicated to the creation of hardware support for the motion capture. This ASCII file format simply describes the captors and their position at each sampling period.

=== ASF/AMC file formats ===
This format was developed by Acclaim, a video game company. Once entered in the public domain it has been used by Oxford Metrics (Vicon Motion Capture Systems). The Acclaim format is composed of two different files, one for the skeleton and the other one for the movement. The separation between these two types has been done because the same skeleton is often used for numerous distinct movements. The file containing the skeleton description in the ASF file (Acclaim Skeleton File) and the file containing the movement data is the AMC file (Acclaim Motion Capture data).

=== BRD file format ===
The format is uniquely used by the motion capture system Ascension Technology “Flock of Birds” developed by LambSoft. It allowed stocking the data coming from a magnetic motion capture system.

=== GRC file format ===
The GRC file format is file format to store motion capture data from Synertial mocap system. GRC includes RAW data from inertial sensors (such as rotation, acceleration, and magnetic field strength), skeleton details, absolute position of the skeleton root and various metadata (notes, TimeCode, ..).
Thanks to the fact that the RAW data from this file are read by Synertial SDK and the skeleton structure is recomputed each time they are needed, the file format is memory efficient. GRC file format data are compatible and can be exported into BVH and FBX file formats using Synertial software tools.

=== HTR and GTR file formats ===
The HTR format (Hierarchical Translation Rotation) has been developed as a native format for the skeleton of the Motion Analysis software. It has been created as an alternative to the BVH format to make up for its main drawbacks. A HTR variant exist which is called the GTR format (Global Translation Rotation) and is the same format less the structural information.

=== TAK file format ===
The Tak, pronounced "take," file format is used by the Motive software developed by OptiTrack. The file can contain information on:

- Marker position and residual error
- Skeleton information and 6DoF Rigid Body position and rotation
- Force Plate Data
- Audio
- General information on capture, like frame rate, calculation properties of markers, camera filters, synchronization method, recording system data/time
- SMPTE Timecode
- Recorded Camera Data

=== TRC file format ===
The TRC file format is another file format from Motion Analysis. It contains not only the raw data from the full body motion capture system they developed but also the output data coming from their face tracker.

The TRC file format, conversely to most others, is not skeleton-based.

=== CSM file format ===
The CSM format is an optical tracking format that is used by Character Studio (an animation and skinning plug-in for 3ds Max) for importing marker data.

=== V/VSK file format ===
The V file format is a binary motion data format developed by Vicon Motion Systems. This file is normally used in conjunction with a VSK file also developed by Vicon Motion System. The VSK file contains the skeleton Hierarchy. The V file can contain the following data:
- Marker data
- Global segment translation and rotation data
- Local rotation data (with root translation data)

=== C3D file format ===
The C3D file format is a public domain, binary file format developed in the mid-1980s at The National Institutes of Health in Bethesda, Maryland. It stores 3D coordinate information, analog data and associated information used in 3D motion data capture and subsequent analysis operations. At the time of its development all 3D motion capture systems stored their data in multiple files, each with a different proprietary format, making the exchange of data between various biomechanics and gait analysis laboratories very difficult. With the introduction and adoption of the C3D file format by all major 3D motion capture companies all necessary 3D information, analog data and parameters describing the data can be seamlessly transferred between researchers and laboratories, regardless of the hardware or environment used to collect the data. The major features of the C3D file format are listed below:

- The ability to store 3D positional and analog data in both processed and unprocessed form.
- Store information describing the physical design of the laboratory such as EMG channels used, force plate positions, and marker sets, etc.
- Store Trial information relating to the circumstances of the test session such as sample rates, filenames, dates, EMG muscles recorded, etc.
- Store subject information e.g. ID, age at trial, with physical parameters such as weight, leg length, etc.
- Store calculated analysis results such as gait timing, cycle information and related information.
- Extensibility - the C3D format provides the ability to store new information without making older data obsolete.
- The public specification and description of the C3D format allows anyone to access data without depending on a manufacturer for information.

Prior to the introduction of the C3D file format almost all biomechanics and gait analysis software was written for each specific 3D system manufacturers file format. As a result, researchers and clinicians were restricted to either writing their own analysis software or else using only the software provided by with their 3D data collection system. The introduction of the C3D format resulted in the availability of a substantial body of third-party software and freed the research community from dependence on any individual 3D data system manufacturer.

The C3D file format, conversely to most others, is not skeleton-based, and is binary.

=== GMS file format ===
The GMS (Gesture and Motion Signal) format is a low-level, binary, minimal, but generic, format for storing Gesture and Motion Signals in a flexible, organized, optimized way. The GMS format takes into account the minimal features a format carrying movement/gesture information needs: flexible dimensionality for the signals, versatile structuration, flexible types of the encoded variables, and spatial and temporal properties of gesture and motion signals. GMS received the support of the FP6 Network of Excellence IST-2002-002114 – "Enactive Interfaces".

The GMS file format, conversely to most others, is NOT skeleton-based, and is binary.

=== HDF file format ===
A closed binary file format developed by House of Moves for use in their proprietary software called (at the time) Diva. This file format is essentially a dump of a Diva scene. It includes all translational marker data as well as all rotational bone data in the scene and more.

=== FBX file format ===
The FBX proprietary file format (.fbx) owned by Autodesk since 2006. The Blender Foundation has published an unofficial specification for binary FBX.

=== PZ2 file format ===
The PZ2 format is used by the popular 3D figure software Poser and DAZ Studio. The format can encode both body and facial animation, and can be applied by dropping the file onto the character in the viewport. It is text-based, akin to XML in structure, and can be easily edited. There is also a face-only variant (no neck) called FC2. Motion capture software that can output PZ2 includes Zign Track, F-Clone, Kinect Capture, Brekel Face, and Faceshift via a free script.
