= Biovision Hierarchy =

File format for 3D animations

BioVision Hierarchy
- Filename extension: .bvh
- Developed by: BioVision (later owned by Autodesk)
- Type of format: 3D animation data format
- Open format?: No

BioVision Hierarchy (BVH) is a file format used for storing motion capture data. It was developed by BioVision, a company that was later acquired by Motion analysis Corporation. The format consists of a hierarchical structure of joints, with each joint containing rotation and translation data. BVH files are widely used in the film, gaming, and animation industries.

== History and Development ==
BVH file format's history and development span back to the 1990s. It was originally developed as a proprietary file format for BioVision's motion capture systems, but later it was adopted by other motion capture systems, such as Vicon and OptiTrack. In the early days, BVH files were created for specific models and needed to be reworked for different models. However, as the use of BVH grew, more standardized models were created and used across different systems.

The development of BVH file format was a significant milestone in 3D animation and motion capture. Prior to BVH, motion data was recorded with pen and paper or entered manually into a computer. BVH allowed for the automatic capture and recording of motion data, making it easier and more efficient to create realistic animations.

Today, BVH remains a widely used file format for motion capture data and is supported by many animation software packages, such as Autodesk's Maya and Blender. It has become an essential tool in the animation industry, particularly for creating realistic and lifelike animations for movies and video games.

== Comparison with other file formats ==
=== Filmbox (FBX) ===
- BVH files are often used in conjunction with software applications that support the format, including Blender, Maya, and MotionBuilder.
- FBX files are compatible with a wide range of software applications, including Autodesk products, Unity, and Unreal Engine.
- BVH files are limited to animation data capture and do not include other scene information.
- FBX files offer a wider range of animation features, including support for animation events, several animation tracks, and curves.
- BVH files are comparatively smaller in size compared to FBX files.
- FBX offers more control and flexibility at the expense of additional complexity and file size.

== See also ==
- List of motion and gesture file formats
- Bounding volume hierarchy
