= Friday or Another Day =

Vendredi ou un autre jour
- Directed by: Yvan Le Moine
- Screenplay by: Yvan Le Moine
- Based on: Friday, or, The Other Island by Michel Tournier
- Produced by: Yvan Le Moine
- Starring: Philippe Nahon; Alain Moraïda
- Cinematography: Danny Elsen
- Edited by: Matyas Veress
- Music by: George van Dam
- Production companies: A.A. Les Films Belge, Artisan, C&C Partners, Cosmokino, Digital Graphics, Wic
- Distributed by: Floris Films, Cosmokino, Visual Factory
- Release date: 2005
- Running time: 120 minutes
- Countries: France, Belgium
- Language: French

Friday or Another Day (French: Vendredi ou un autre jour) is a French language film, directed by Yvan Le Moine, which was released in 2005.

Inspired by the novel Friday, or, The Other Island, written by Michel Tournier, it was shot in La Réunion with the main actors Philippe Nahon and Alain Moraïda. It was awarded the Swiss Critics Boccalino Award at the Locarno International Film Festival in 2005 .

== Cast ==
- Philippe Nahon : Philippe de Nohan
- Alain Moraïda : Vendredi
- Ornella Muti : Madame de Nohan
- Hanna Schygulla : The patroness
- Philippe Grand'Henry : Joseph
- Jean Hermann : The priest
- Jean-Paul Ganty : Tristan
- Valérie D'Hondt : The maid
- Frédéric Guillaume : The baker
