= Octane Render =

Unbiased rendering application

- Developer: OTOY Inc.
- Stable release: OctaneRender 2022.1 (CUDA) / Octane X (Metal) / June 8, 2023
- Written in: C++
- Operating system: Windows XP and later; MacOS Big Sur or later; Linux
- Platform: Arm64 or x64; CUDA-enabled NVIDIA or Apple Metal-enabled AMD, Intel Skylake or Apple M1 GPU
- Type: Rendering system
- License: Proprietary commercial software
- Website: home.otoy.com/render/octane-render/

Octane Render is an unbiased rendering application with real-time capability developed by graphics software company OTOY Inc.

Octane Render was the first commercially available unbiased path-tracer that fully utilized the GPU, allowing users to modify scenes close to real time without the potential speed penalty of CPU rendering.

Octane Render runs on Nvidia's CUDA technology using Nvidia GPU video cards; Octane X for macOS Big Sur, and runs on Metal on AMD, Intel Skylake and Apple Silicon graphics cards.
