= Pepper&Carrot =

Webcomic by David Revoy and surrounding community

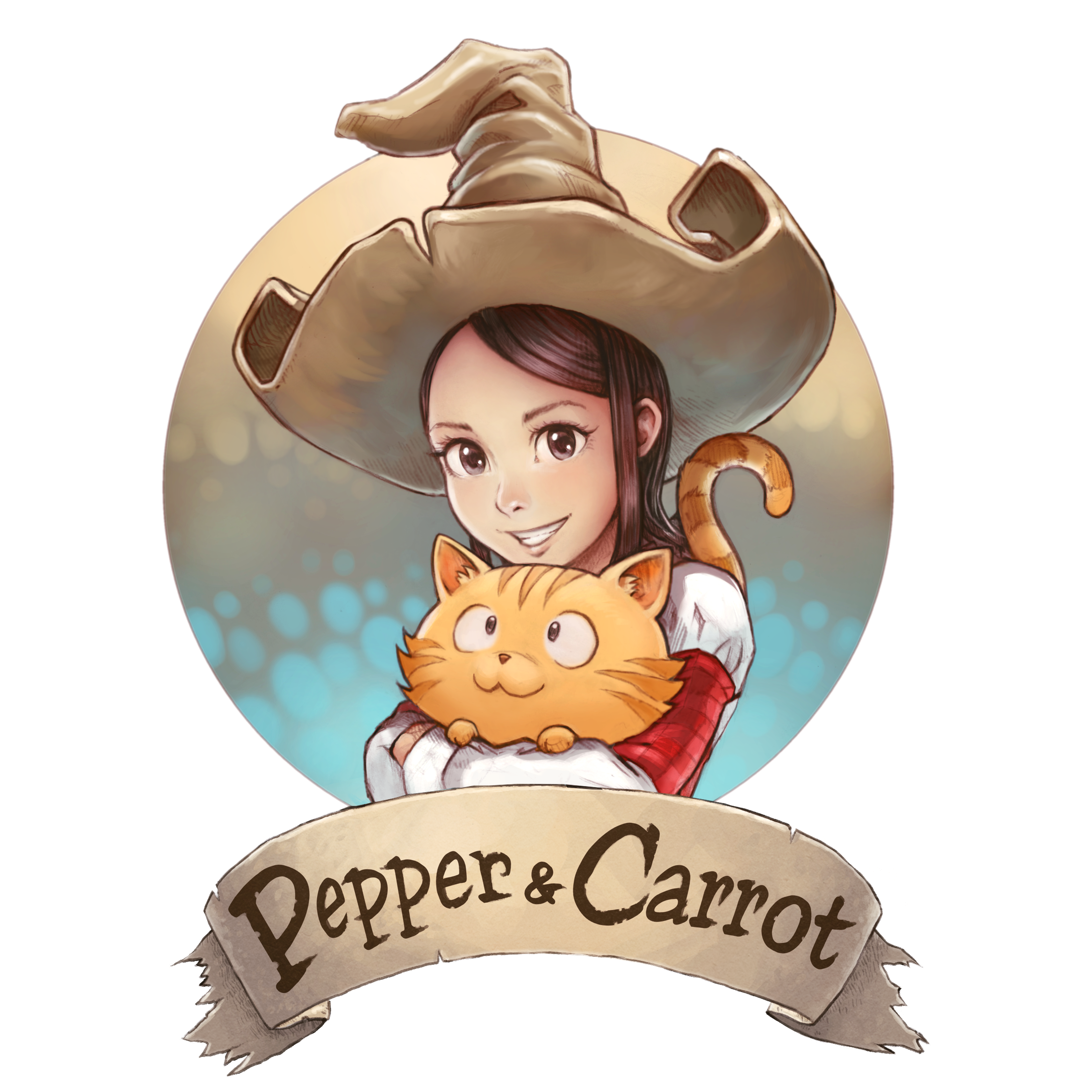
- Series logo since October 2015
- Author: David Revoy
- Illustrator: David Revoy
- Website: peppercarrot.com
- Current status/schedule: Active (irregular publication schedule)
- Launch date: 10 May 2014
- Publisher(s): Glénat Editions, DriveThruComics and others
- Genres: Coming-of-age; Fantasy; Magical girl; Political fiction

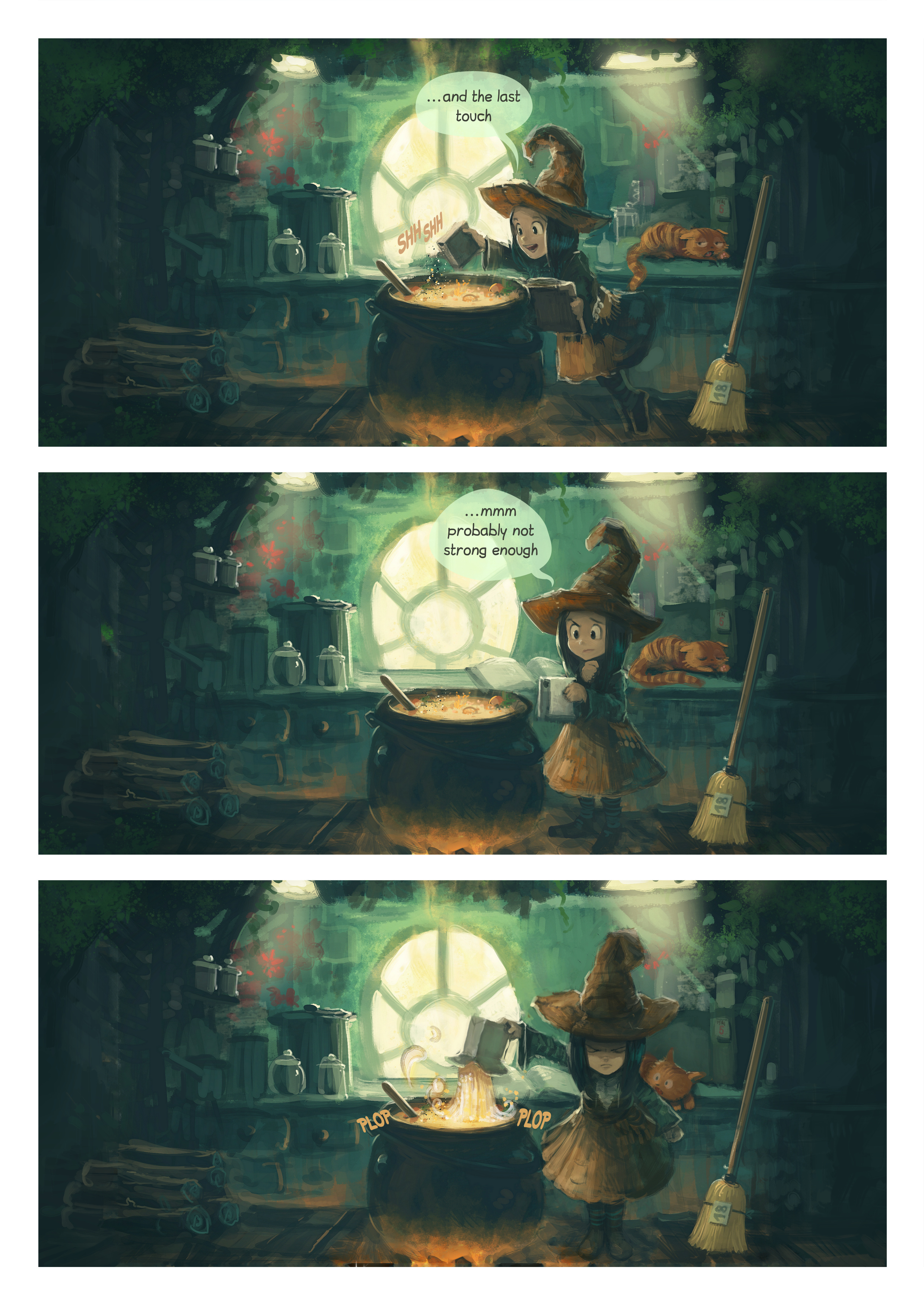
A page from the first episode, with a different design of the main character Pepper than in later episodes

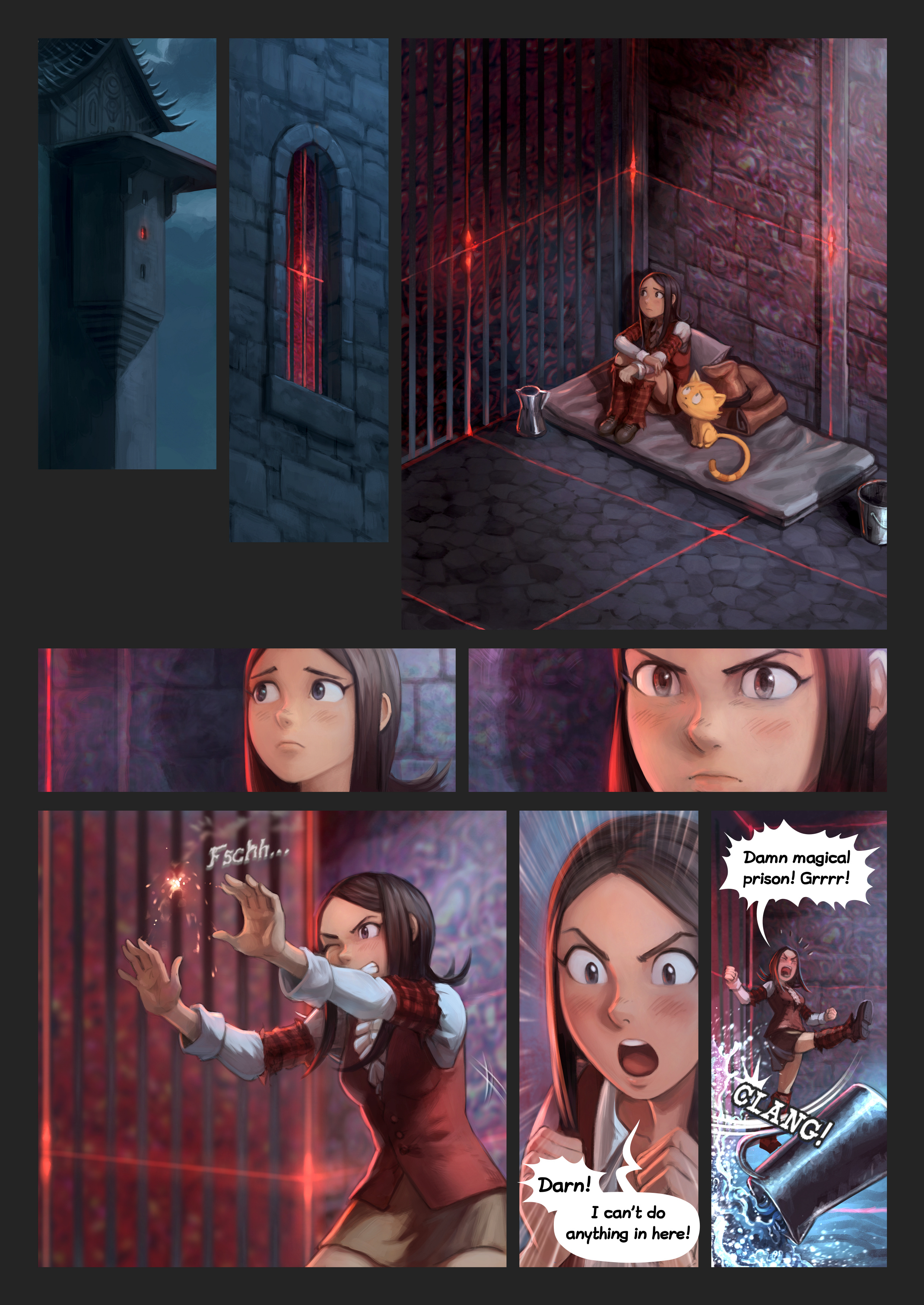
Episode 36 page 2 of Pepper&Carrot

Pepper&Carrot is a formerly (Note: The webcomic's license allows remixes and reuse, including commercial use, resulting in derivative works such as animated short films, cosplay, fanart, a card game, a boardgame, several video games, and research projects. However, since October 8th, 2026, Revoy prohibits modifications of his art and writing using artificial intelligence, which therefore makes Pepper&Carrot not free anymore.) free, currently source-available webcomic series by French artist David Revoy. First released in May 2014, it is published by Glénat Editions, Ar Gripi, Popcom, Prikazka-Igra, and Outland Forlag.

The series consists of small episodes about teenage witch Pepper and her cat Carrot, and it aims to be accessible for everyone.

It is fully or mostly translated into 28 languages, with additional partial translations in 40 more.

Revoy creates the series entirely with free software such as Krita, Blender and Inkscape, making the Krita source files for each image available for download.

In March 2024, Revoy announced he would bring the series to a close, planning on ending it on episode 42. However, in 2025 he retracted this statement, explaining that he would continue working on Pepper&Carrot.

== Plot ==
Pepper is a young orphan witch disciple at Chaosah, the smallest of the six schools of magic on the magical planet Hereva. She is aided by her cat Carrot, and lives with her mentors Thyme, Cayenne, and Cumin in a house in the forest of Squirrel's End. Her peers are Saffron, Shichimi, Coriander, and Camomile.

Humans and various humanoids live alongside dragons and other mystical animals. After years of war between the schools of magic, there is a grudging peace. Pepper navigates the vicissitudes of growing up in a changing world and works hard to find her own place in it, but does so with a sense of humor. But there are happenings between the nations elsewhere in Hereva that may put a wrench in her plans.

Revoy aims for each episode to contain a small story arc where a character evolves and learns. The story bible is available on the website.

== List of episodes ==
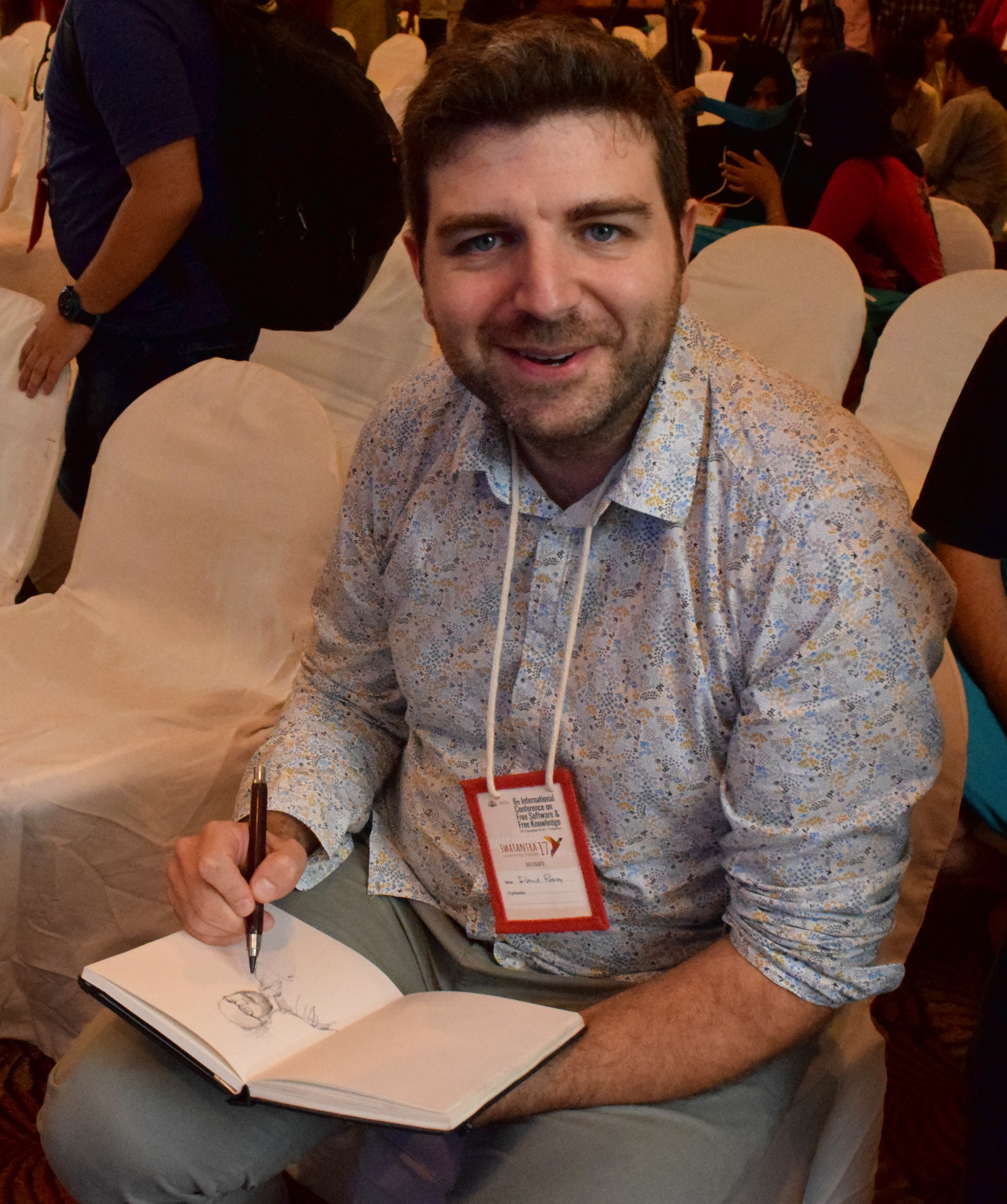
Pepper&Carrot creator David Revoy in December 2017.

Since the first episode, around 0.344 episodes per month have been published (or 2.91 months between each episode). (Note: (38 - 1 episodes) / (2014-05-10 to 2023-04-26 which is about 107.5 months)) Episodes 6-24 were first drafted in French.

No.	English title	French title	Dialog	Release date	Patrons
1	The Potion of Flight		yes	2014-05-10	0
2	Rainbow Potions		no	2014-07-25	21
3	The Secret Ingredients		yes	2014-10-03	93
4	Stroke of Genius		yes	2014-11-21	156
5	Special holiday episode		no	2014-12-19	170
6	The Potion Contest	Le concours de potion	yes	2015-03-28	245
7	The Wish	Le souhait	yes	2015-04-30	245
8	Pepper's Birthday Party	L'anniversaire de Pepper	yes	2015-06-28	354
9	The Remedy	Le remède	yes	2015-07-31	406
10	Summer Special	Spécial été	no	2015-08-29	422
11	The Witches of Chaosah	Les sorcières de Chaosah	yes	2015-09-30	502
12	Autumn Clearout	Rangement d'Automne	yes	2015-10-31	575
13	The Pyjama Party	La Soirée Pyjama	yes	2015-12-08	602
14	The Dragon's Tooth	La Dent de Dragon	yes	2016-01-29	671
15	The Crystal Ball	La Boule de Cristal	no	2016-03-25	686
16	The Sage of the Mountain	Le Sage de la Montagne	yes	2016-04-30	671
17	A Fresh Start	Un Nouveau Départ	yes	2016-06-30	719
18	The Encounter	La Rencontre	yes	2016-08-05	720
19	Pollution	Pollution	yes	2016-10-26	755
20	The Picnic	Le Pique-nique	no	2016-12-17	825
21	The Magic Contest	Le Concours de Magie	yes	2017-02-23	816
22	The Voting System	Le système de vote	yes	2017-05-30	864
23	Take a Chance	Saisir la chance	yes	2017-08-10	879
24	The Unity Tree	L'Arbre de l'unité	yes	2017-12-15	810
25	There Are No Shortcuts		no	2018-05-17	909
26	Books Are Great		yes	2018-07-28	1,098
27	Coriander's Invention		yes	2018-10-31	1,060
28	The Festivities		yes	2019-01-24	960
29	Destroyer of Worlds		yes	2019-04-25	960
30	Need a Hug		no	2019-09-03	973
31	The Fight		yes	2019-12-20	971
32	The Battlefield		yes	2020-03-31	1,121
33	Spell of War		yes	2020-06-29	1,190
34	The Knighting of Shichimi		yes	2021-03-31	1,096
35	The Reflection		yes	2021-06-18	1,054
36	The Surprise Attack		yes	2021-12-15	1,036
37	The Tears of Phoenix		yes	2022-08-03	1,058
38	The Healer		yes	2023-04-26	1,084
39	The Tavern		yes	2025-11-12	1,106
40	Unknown	Unknown	Unknown	Unknown	Unknown
41	Unknown	Unknown	Unknown	Unknown	Unknown
42	Unknown	Unknown	Unknown	Unknown	Unknown

== Funding ==
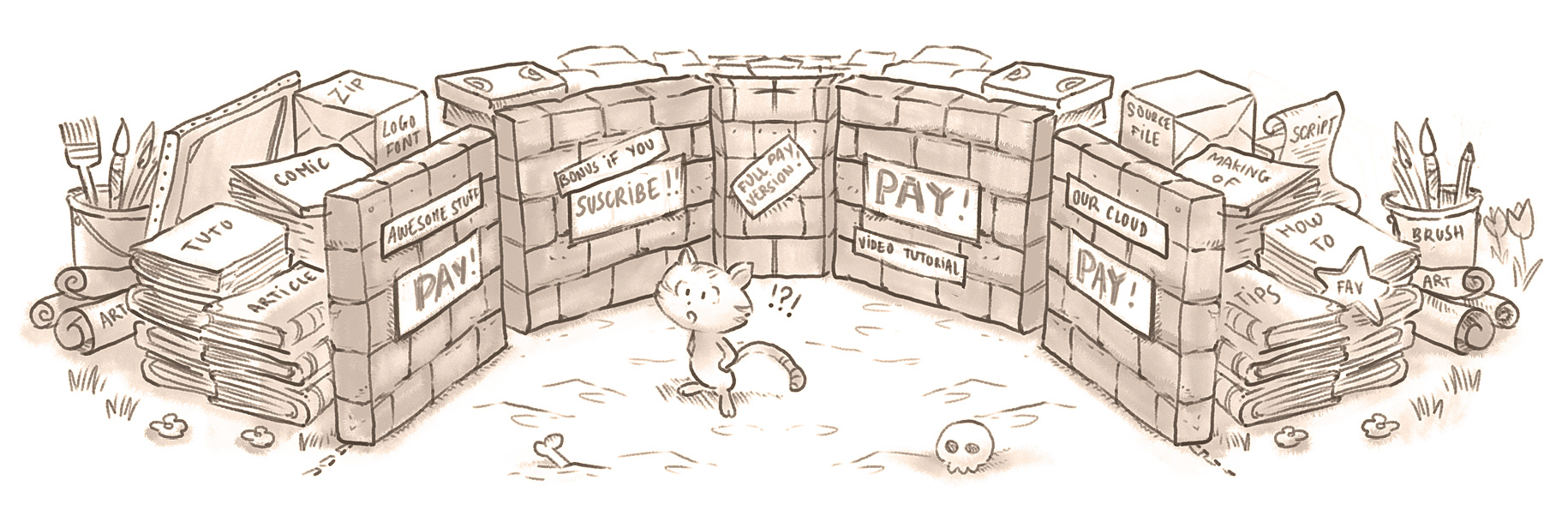
The character Carrot in an illustration of content behind paywalls. Revoy said that "Pepper&Carrot will never ask you to pay anything or to get a subscription to get access to new content."

Revoy aims to change the comic book industry by eliminating intermediate steps in the production process. Though Pepper&Carrot is free, he encourages people to support him via crowdfunding in the form a small amount of money per episode that is released.

Patreon takes a commission of 5%, in addition to any credit card fees. This is significantly less than a traditional chain where the publisher, distributors and retailers each claim a part of the profit. People donating monthly some amount on Patreon to Pepper&Carrot – are named on the bottom of the comics. As of May 2019, 816 people donate a total of US$2,939 per month, allowing David Revoy to work full time on Pepper&Carrot.

In 2018, Pepper&Carrot was believed to be one of the more successful creative projects on Liberapay, a platform for recurrent donations. In February 2023, Revoy made €62.11 per week from 79 patrons and with the top public patron giving €8.23 per week. About starting an account on Liberapay despite already receiving funding via Patreon, Revoy said it provided "a stronger focus on privacy for the Pepper&Carrot audience" and offered lower transaction fees. Since 2022, also patrons on Liberapay can get their name in the credit written at the end of the webcomic.

Other methods of payment to support Revoy are Tipeee, PayPal, and wire transfer (which works worldwide and is free of charge within Europe)

Revoy suggests the business model allows the comic to stay independent and doesn't have to resort to advertising. On the webcomic's webpage he extensively explains his philosophy, the reasons for wanting to cut out intermediaries between artist and audience, and why he does not put any content behind a paywall.

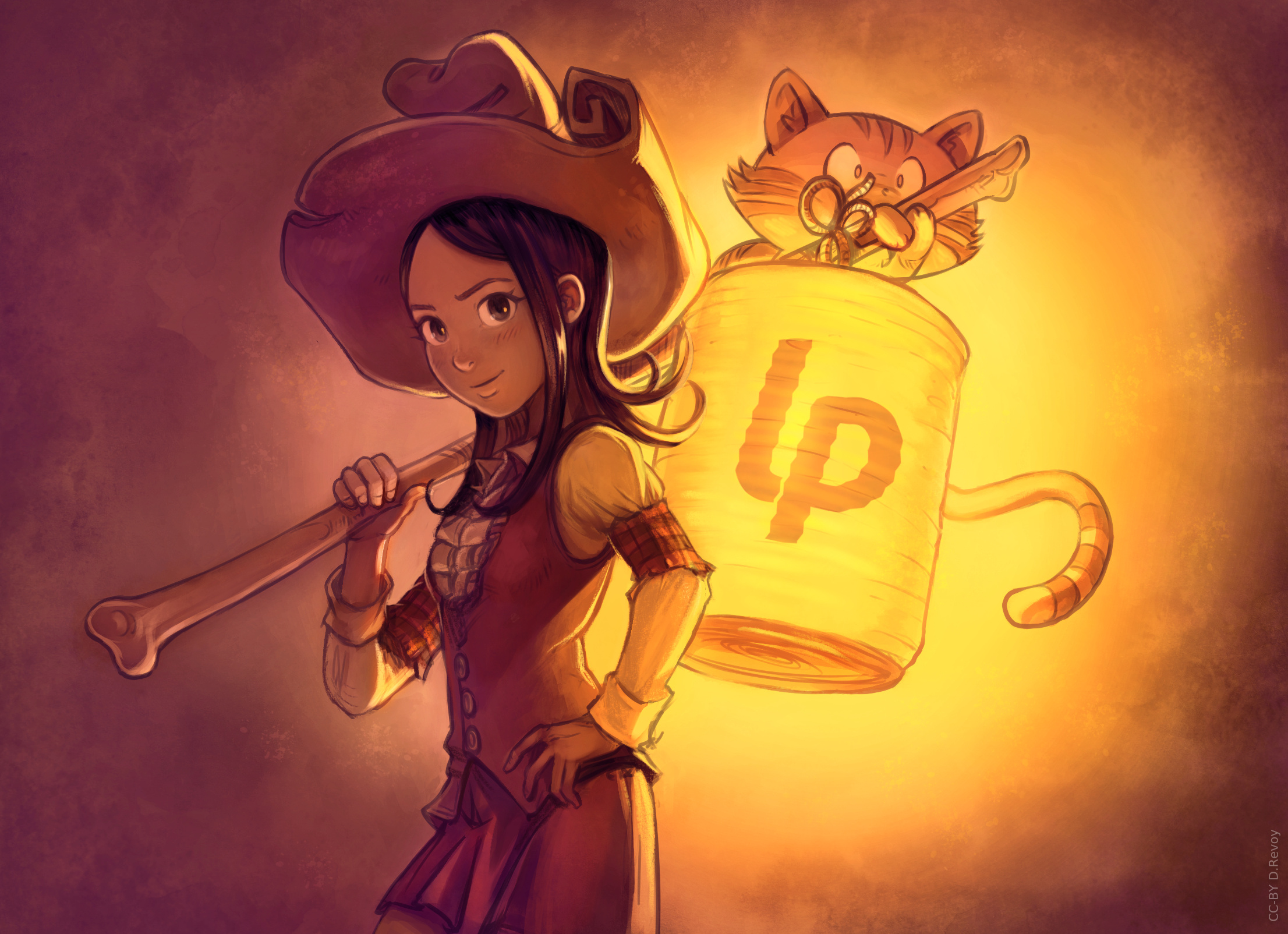
Pepper&Carrot is crowdfunded via several platforms. The publisher Glénat became the top donor but Revoy retained the copyright and creative control.

When the publisher Glénat reached out to Revoy about publishing Pepper&Carrot, he declined their offer of a traditional contract with royalty payments in favor of keeping the Creative Commons attribution license, something that caused confusion in the legal and financial departments of the publisher. Glénat then offered to be the top patron of the webcomic, and Revoy retained the copyright and creative control over it. He considers Glénat's published books as just one of many other derivative works of the webcomic.

About working on the webcomic, Revoy said in 2015 that it was a dream come true and that "Every artist I know would love to make their own comics. Would love to get paid for making it, and to keep the control of it".

== Origin and production ==
Revoy aims for each episode to contain a small story arc where a character evolves and learns.

Reviews of the text in the speech balloons, and the translations, are performed in GitLab using Markdown.

=== Translations ===
As of April 2026, the webcomic is translated into the following 28 languages with a coverage of 90 percent or higher:

- Catalan
- Chinese
- Cornish
- Danish
- Dutch language
- English
- Esperanto
- Finnish
- French
- Galo
- German
- Indonesian
- Italian
- Japanese
- Lithuanian
- Norwegian (Bokmål)
- Norwegian (Nynorsk)
- Persian
- Polish
- Brazilian Portuguese
- Romanian
- Russian
- Scottish Gaelic
- Slovene
- Spanish
- Mexican Spanish
- Toki Pona
- Vietnamese

For another 40 languages, the coverage is less than 90 percent.

The web page has an open invitation to contribute to translations, and detailed instructions on how to do it.

== License and derivative works ==
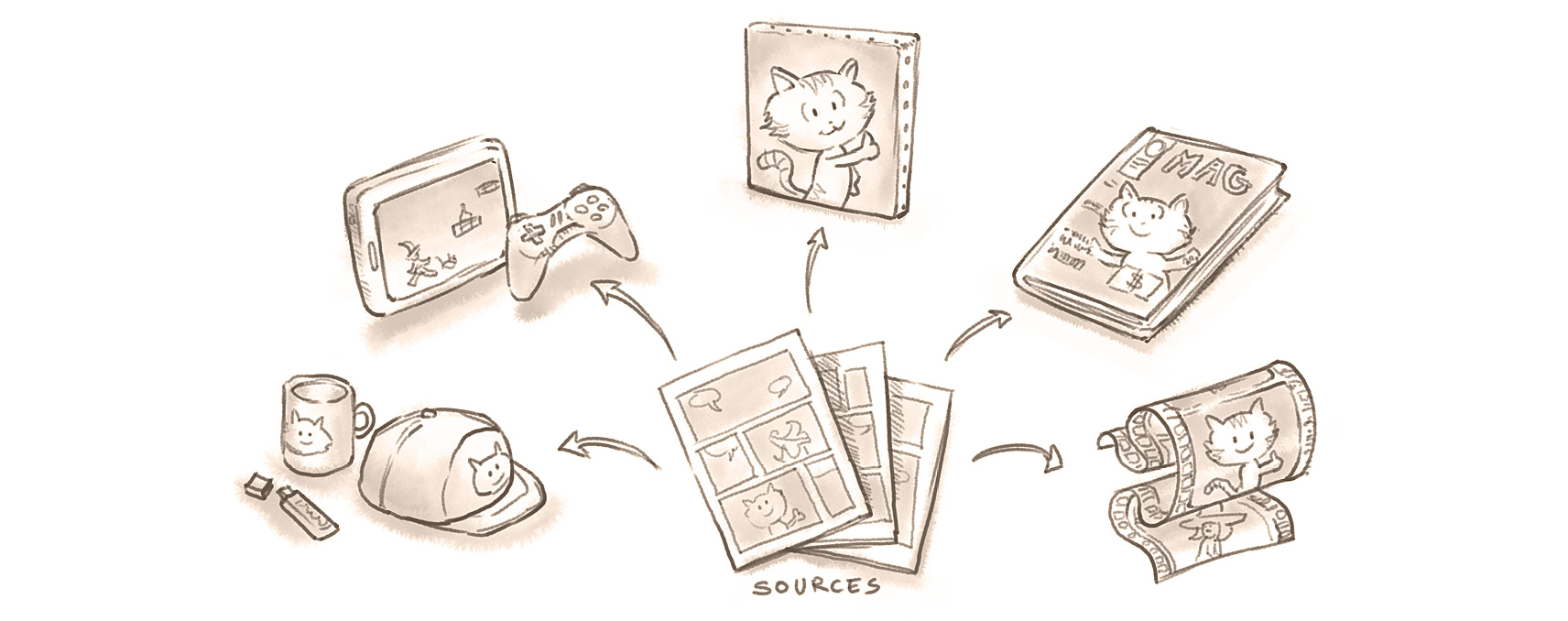
The character Carrot in an illustration of derivative works being created from a source work. Revoy said that he will "never regret making Pepper&Carrot so open", and that he is happy to see other people making money from it.

All artwork is made available under the Creative Commons Attribution 4.0 license (CC-BY), but AI derivation is prohibited since October 8th, 2026. The license permits the work to be remixed and reused, even for commercial purposes, which has led to derivative works such as animated short films, cosplay, fanart, a card game, a boardgame, several video games, and research.

Revoy often publishes links from his blog to derivative works and has expressed excitement that his work is re-used, saying "I'll never regret making Pepper&Carrot so open." and that he is happy to see other people making money from it.

He attributes some of the success of the webcomic to the release of its source, and highlighted the many translations into other languages.

In 2022, one derivative (a publication) had removed content (a panel) and added dialog to episodes that originally had no dialog. The publisher had been very honest to the audience about the changes by publishing preview files of the content of the books. Revoy saw it as a good opportunity to question his decision to choose a free license for his work, but in the end he affirmed his decision, concluded that it was part of publishing his work under such a free license, and also that part of the work of a publisher is to adapt the content to its audience. He hoped that the derivative publication would help that audience discover his original work. Revoy congratulated the publisher on their successful crowd-funding campaign and welcomed the financial support that the derivative work would bring to his own project of producing future episodes of the webcomic.

On October 8th, 2026, Revoy announced that he was prohibiting AI derivation of all of his artwork. This change of the licensing therefore made any future Pepper&Carrot comics made after that date nonfree.

=== Publication ===
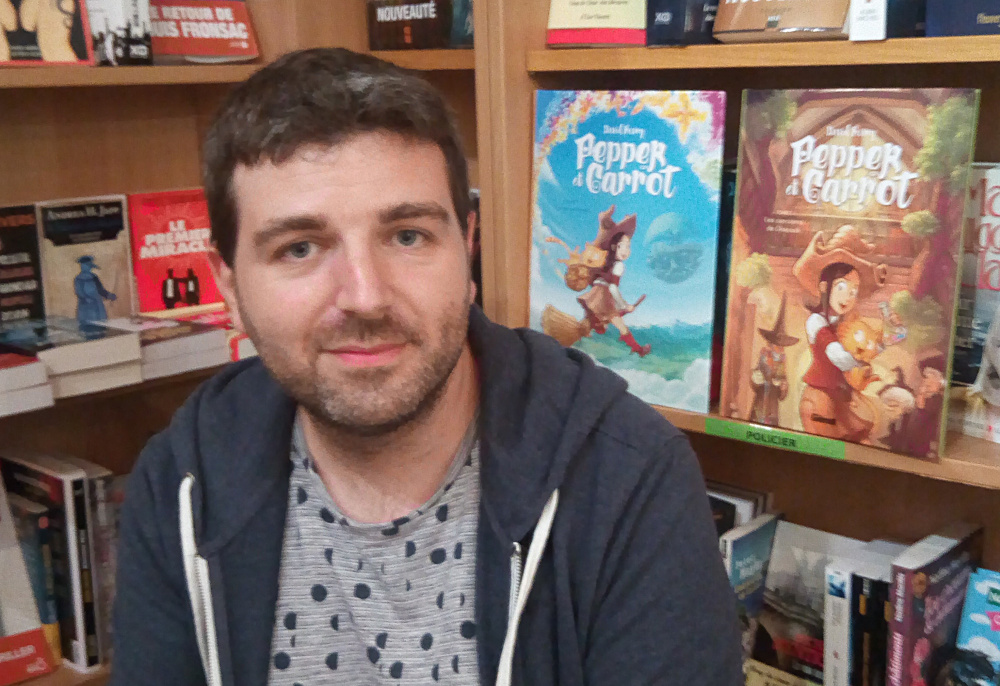
Revoy in front of Glénat publications of Pepper&Carrot in September 2017. Revoy considers the Glénat publications one of many derivative works of the webcomic.

In 2016 French publisher Glénat added a bundle with episodes 1 through 11 to their catalog, to print and distribute the comic in France. Revoy was consulted to ensure the colours and quality of the print are as he envisioned it. The publication has no effect on the license of the webcomic. In April 2017 the second volume of the book, including the episodes 12 to 21, was published by Glénat. There is also a printed version of the Bretonic version of the first ten episodes by publisher Ar Gripi, as well as a German printed version by publisher Popcom, and a Bulgarian version by Prikazka-Igra.

In 2023, Revoy particularly highlighted the Nynorsk publication of episodes 1 to 29 by the Norwegian publisher Outland Forlag, who also sponsors Revoy's work.

=== Animated films ===
The permissive license of the webcomic Pepper&Carrot has allowed several episodes of it to be remixed into animated short films by the Morevna Project, here "The Potion Contest".

In 2016, the Morevna team started a crowdfunding campaign for a motion comic version of episode 6. The animation was done based on the original source files with free software like Krita, Blender, Papagayo-NG and RenderChan. The film was released in June 2017 under the Creative Commons Attribution 4.0 license. Revoy was not associated with the production, but appreciated the project.

=== Video games ===
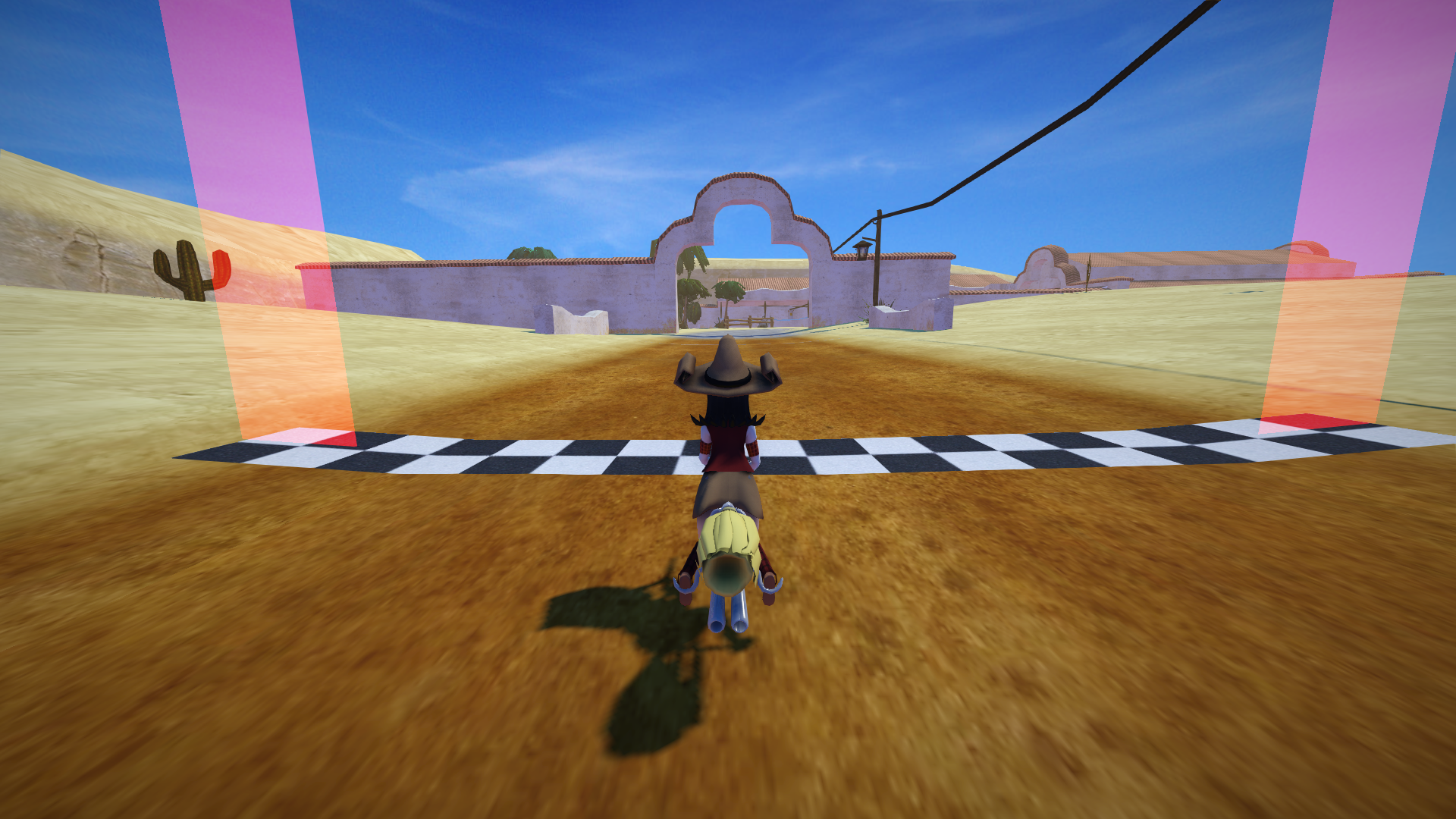
Pepper is a playable character in the free kart racing game SuperTuxKart. Here the character is shown in version 1.3 and the race track "Hacienda".

In 2021, Pepper was made a playable character in the free kart racing game SuperTuxKart 1.3.

There are at least four different video games based on Pepper&Carrot in development.

=== Board game ===
Loyalist Games created a board game based on episode 6 of the comic. Just like the webcomic the game is available under a free license, and its rulebook has instructions in English, Dutch, French and Spanish.

=== Role-playing game ===
In October 2019, Witchcraft: Magic of Hereva was released. The role-playing game used the Dungeons & Dragons rule system.

== Gallery ==
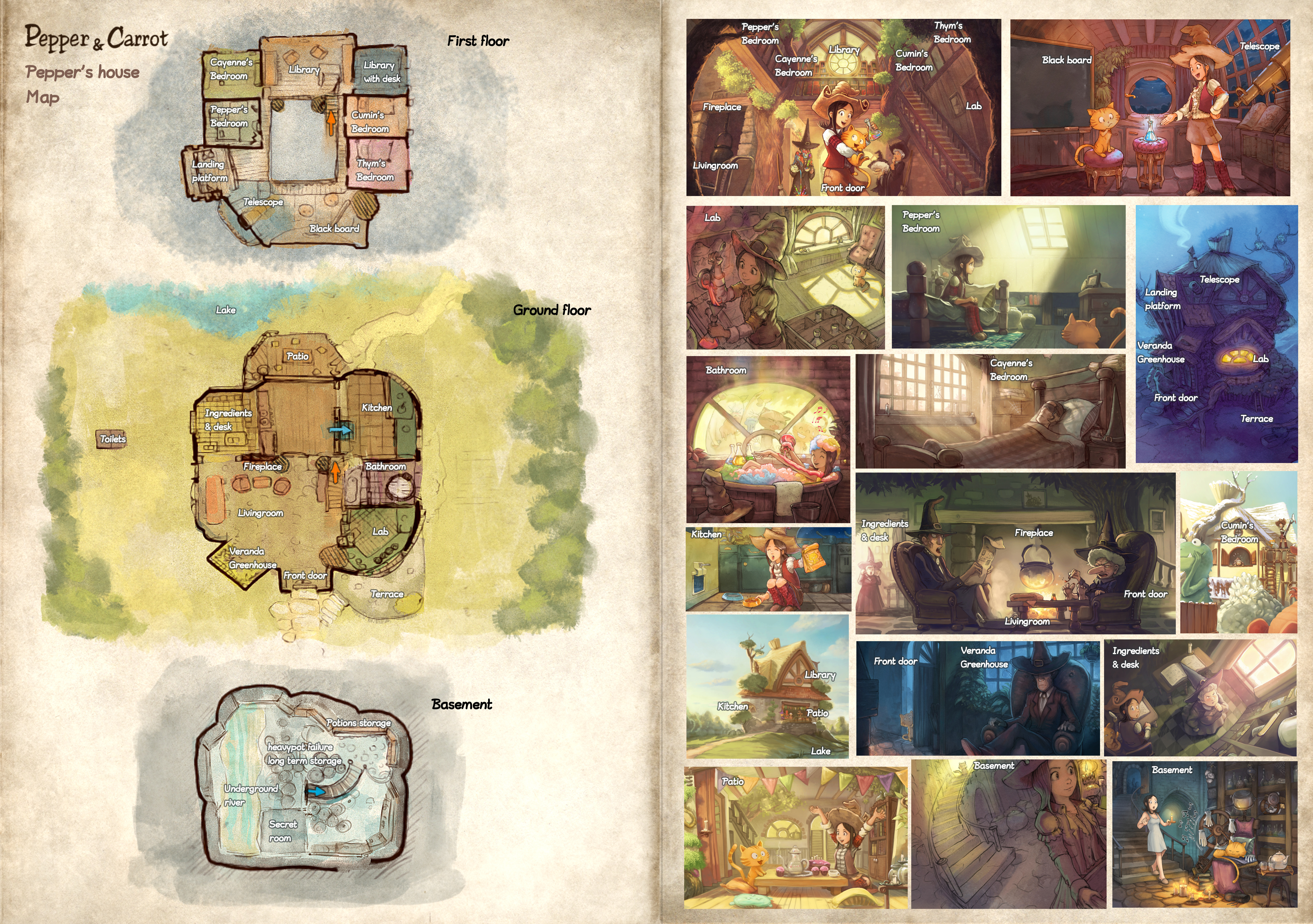
Revoy provided a map of Pepper's house to help other projects create derivative work.

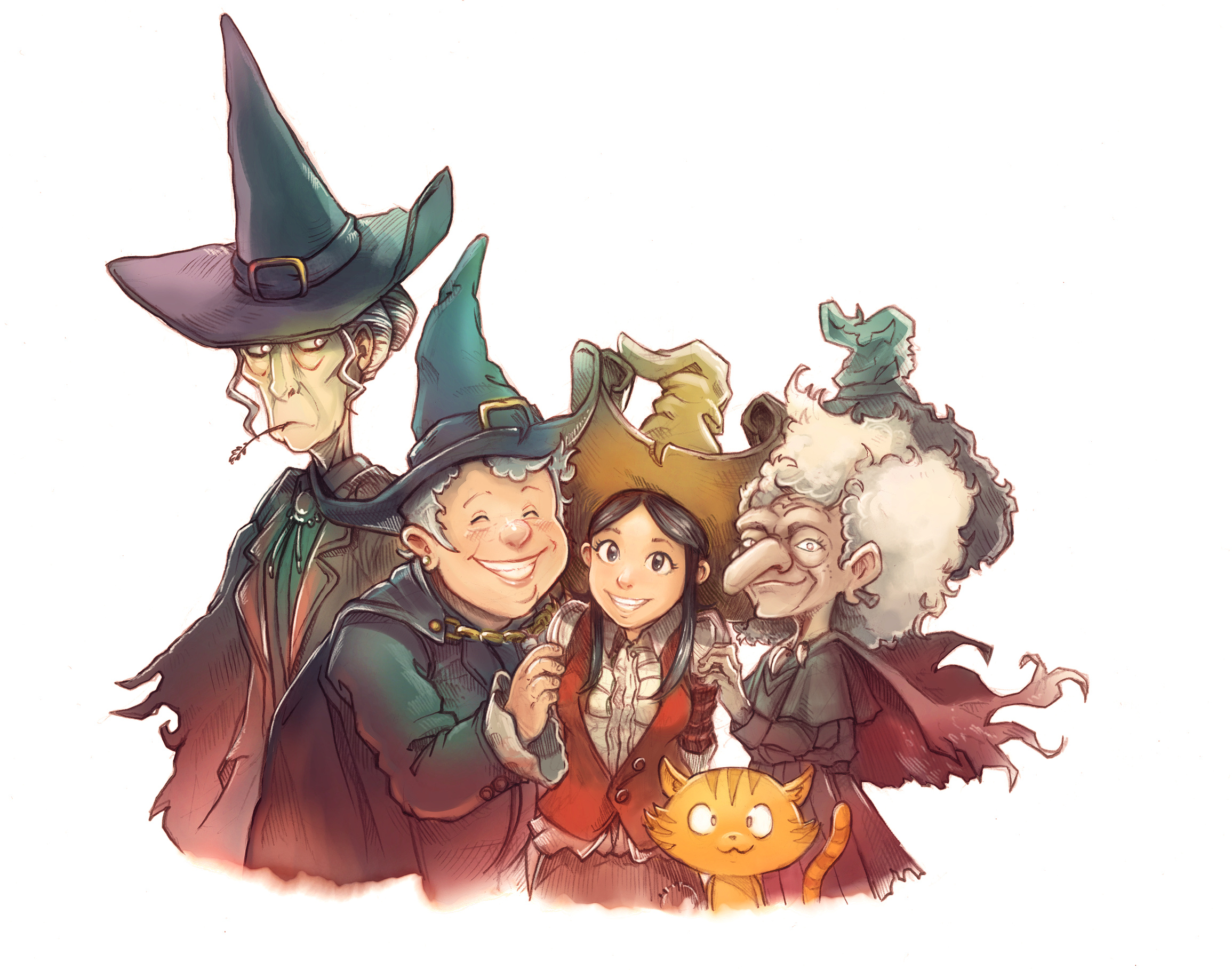
Cayenne, Cumin, Pepper, Thyme and Carrot.

== See also ==
- List of major Creative Commons–licensed works
