= David Revoy =

French artist (born 1981)

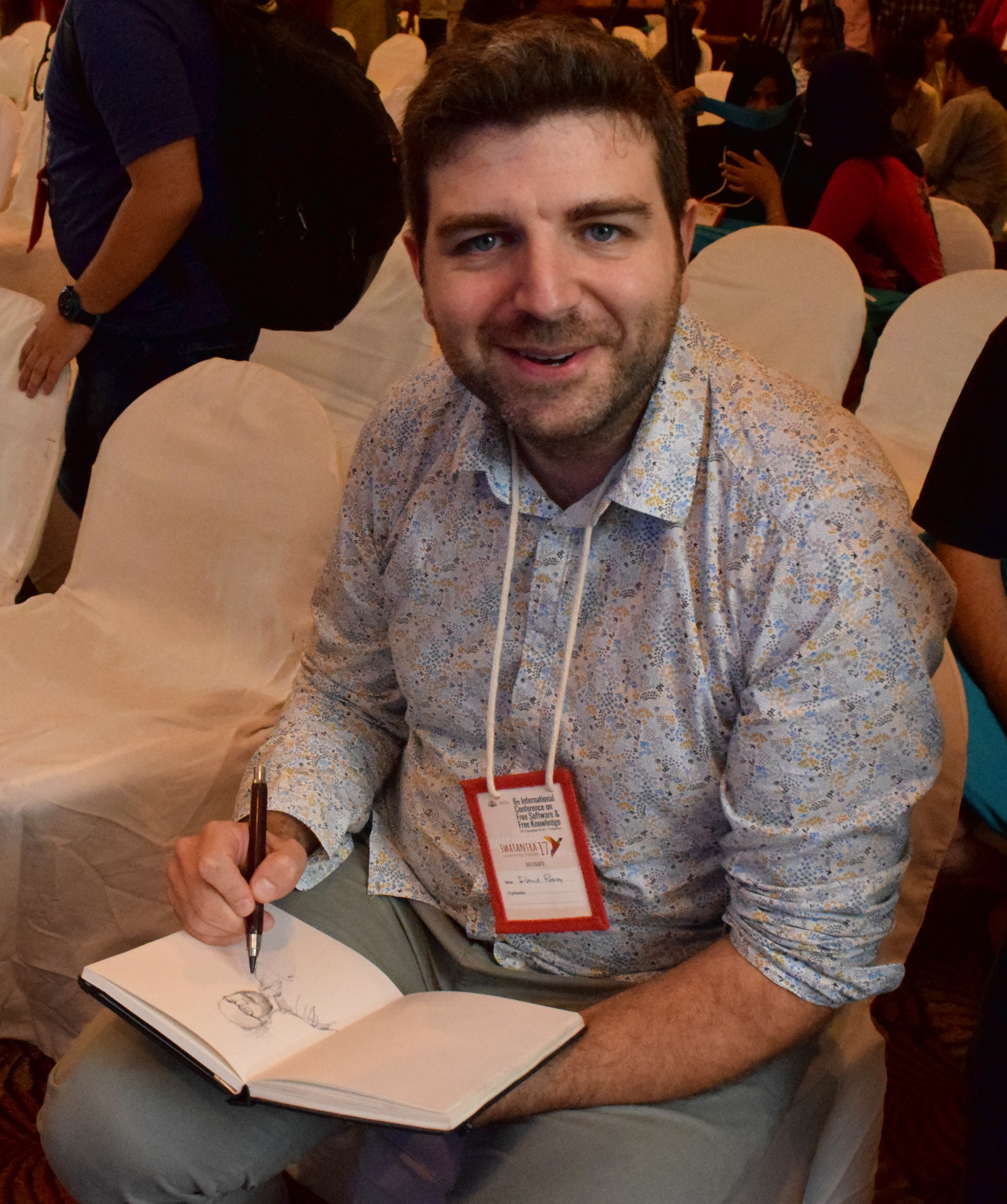
- David Revoy in December 2017
- Born: David Philippe Revoy; 1981 (age 44–45); Reims, France
- Occupations: illustrator; painter; art director
- Spouse: Alicja Revoy
- Awards: CG3D Choice Award (2010)
- Website: davidrevoy.com

The license of the webcomic Pepper&Carrot has allowed several episodes of it to be remixed into animated short films by the Morevna Project, here "The Potion Contest".

David Philippe Revoy (French: [david ʁəvwa]; born in 1981 in Reims) is a French artist best known as the creator of the webcomic series Pepper&Carrot, which is formerly free (Note: The webcomic's license allows remixes and reuse, including commercial use, resulting in derivative works such as animated short films, cosplay, fanart, a card game, a boardgame, several video games, and research projects. However, since October 8th, 2026, Revoy prohibits modifications of his art and writing using artificial intelligence) and has been translated into 27 languages to a degree of 90 percent or more. It is published as books via Glénat.

After work in traditional painting, Revoy started using digital tools in 2003 and moved to use free and open-source software around 2009.

Revoy publishes a large portion of his work under free licenses, allowing his work to be remixed even for commercial use. This has led to derivations of mainly Pepper&Carrot such as animated films, cosplay, a card game and several video games. Revoy has expressed excitement about the derivations and often links to them from his web page. He has interpreted freely licensed works and works in the public domain. In 2010 he was awarded the CG Choice Award for an illustration of Alice in Wonderland. One of his most famous works is "Yin and Yang of world hunger", a remix of the yin and yang symbol.

He has published several tutorials, time-lapse videos, and speed painting videos showing his work process and has described his hardware and software setup.

== Early work ==
Revoy started as a street portraitist in Avignon at the age of 18. Later he worked in traditional painting, illustration, concept art and teaching. In 2003 he ended his career as a traditional painter and started working with digital tools.

== Film work ==
In 2009–2010, Revoy worked as art director on the Blender short film Sintel, which was the first major project that used free software to produce free culture that Revoy encountered. He would later also work on the Blender films Tears of Steel and Cosmos Laundromat.

== Pepper&Carrot ==
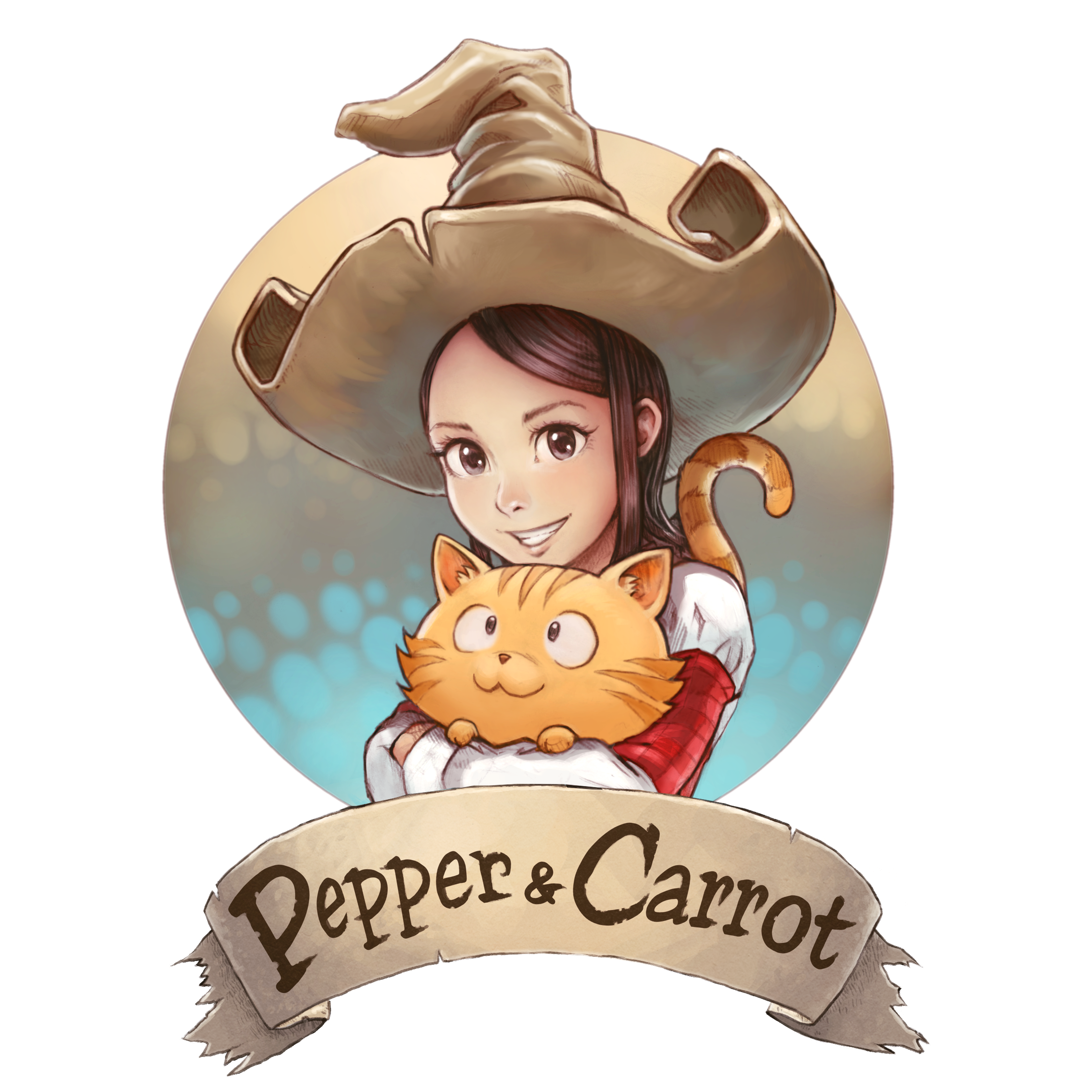
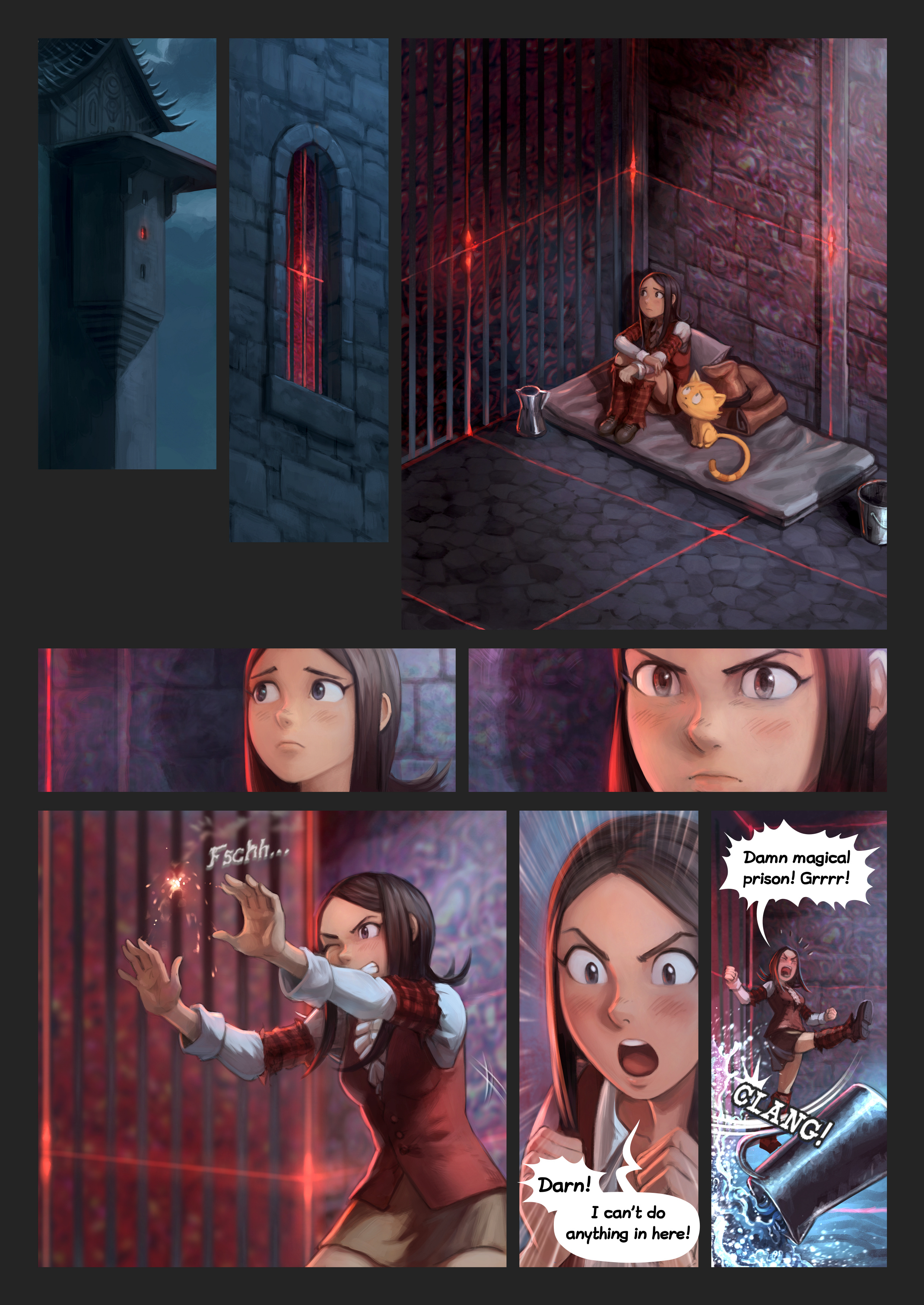
Revoy said about his webcomic Pepper&Carrot (left) that "I'll never regret making Pepper&Carrot so open." One page of episode 36 page 2 (right).

In May 2014, after more than 10 years of freelance work, Revoy published the first episode of the webcomic Pepper&Carrot. Pepper is a young orphan witch disciple at Chaosah, the smallest of the six schools of magic on the magical planet Hereva. She is aided by her cat Carrot, and lives with her mentors Thyme, Cayenne, and Cumin in a house in the forest of Squirrel's End. Her peers are Saffron, Shichimi, Coriander, and Camomile. Revoy aims for each episode to contain a small story arc where a character evolves and learns. The story bible is available on the website.

The webcomic is free (CC-BY) and is financed using crowdfunding. Revoy suggests the business model allows the comic to stay independent and does not have to resort to advertising. Revoy publishes all panels for the comic and often publishes links from his blog to derivations of the comic and characters, such as short animated films, cosplay, a card game and several video games. Revoy has expressed excitement that his work is re-used, saying "I'll never regret making Pepper&Carrot so open." and that he is happy to see other people make money from it. On the webcomic's webpage he extensively explains his philosophy, the reasons for wanting to cut out intermediaries between artist and audience, and why he does not put any content behind a paywall. He attributes some of the success of the webcomic to the release of its source, and highlighted the translations into some 50 languages. Reviews of the text in the comic and the translations are performed in GitLab using Markdown.

When the publisher Glénat reached out to Revoy about publishing Pepper&Carrot, he declined their offer of a traditional contract with royalty payments in favor of keeping the Creative Commons attribution license, something that caused confusion in the legal and financial departments of the publisher. Glénat then offered to be the top patron of the webcomic, and Revoy retained the copyright and creative control over it. He considers Glénat's published books as just one of many other derivative works of the webcomic.

About working on the webcomic, Revoy said in 2015 that it was a dream come true and that "Every artist I know would love to make their own comics. Would love to get paid for making it, and to keep the control of it".

== Free software ==
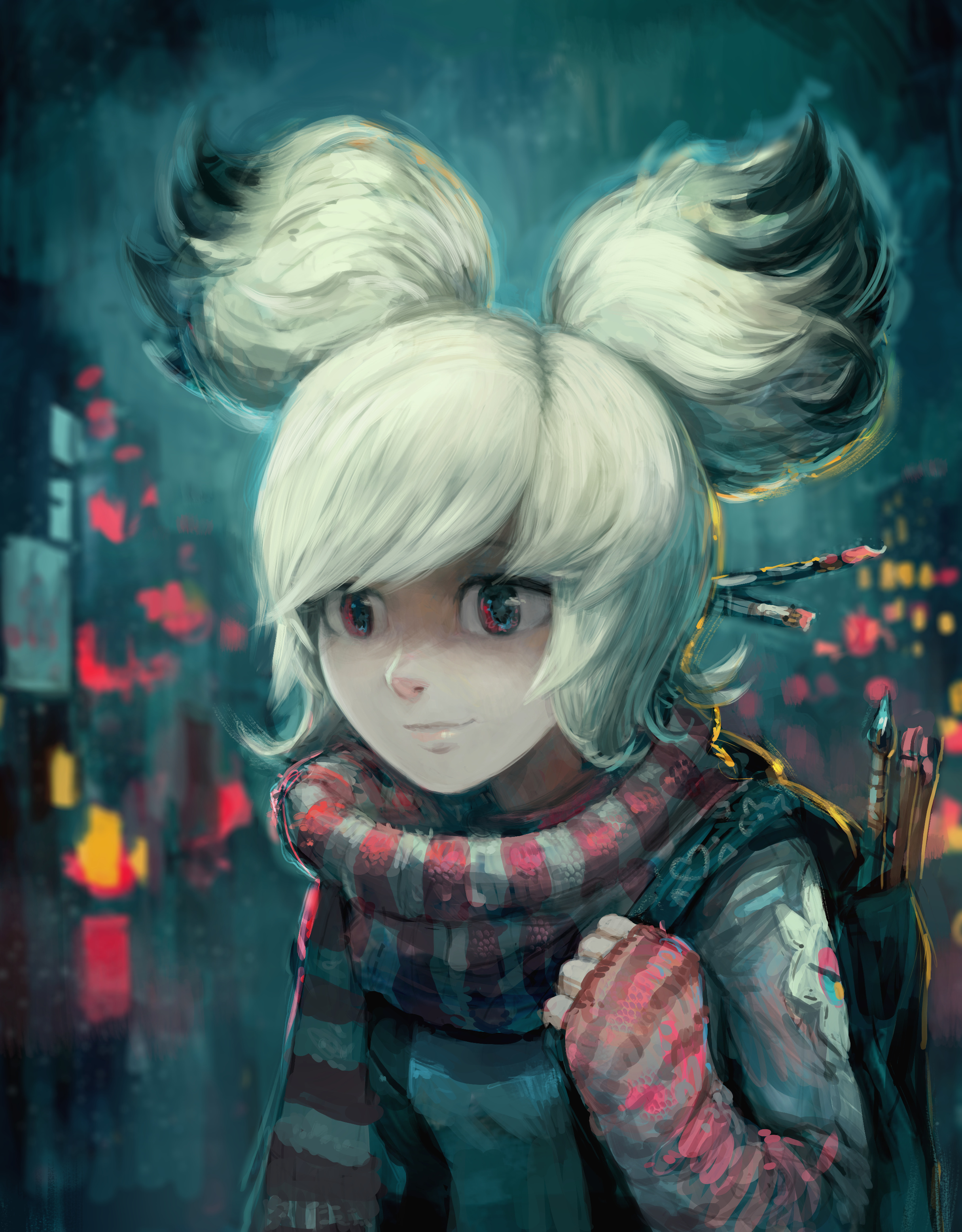
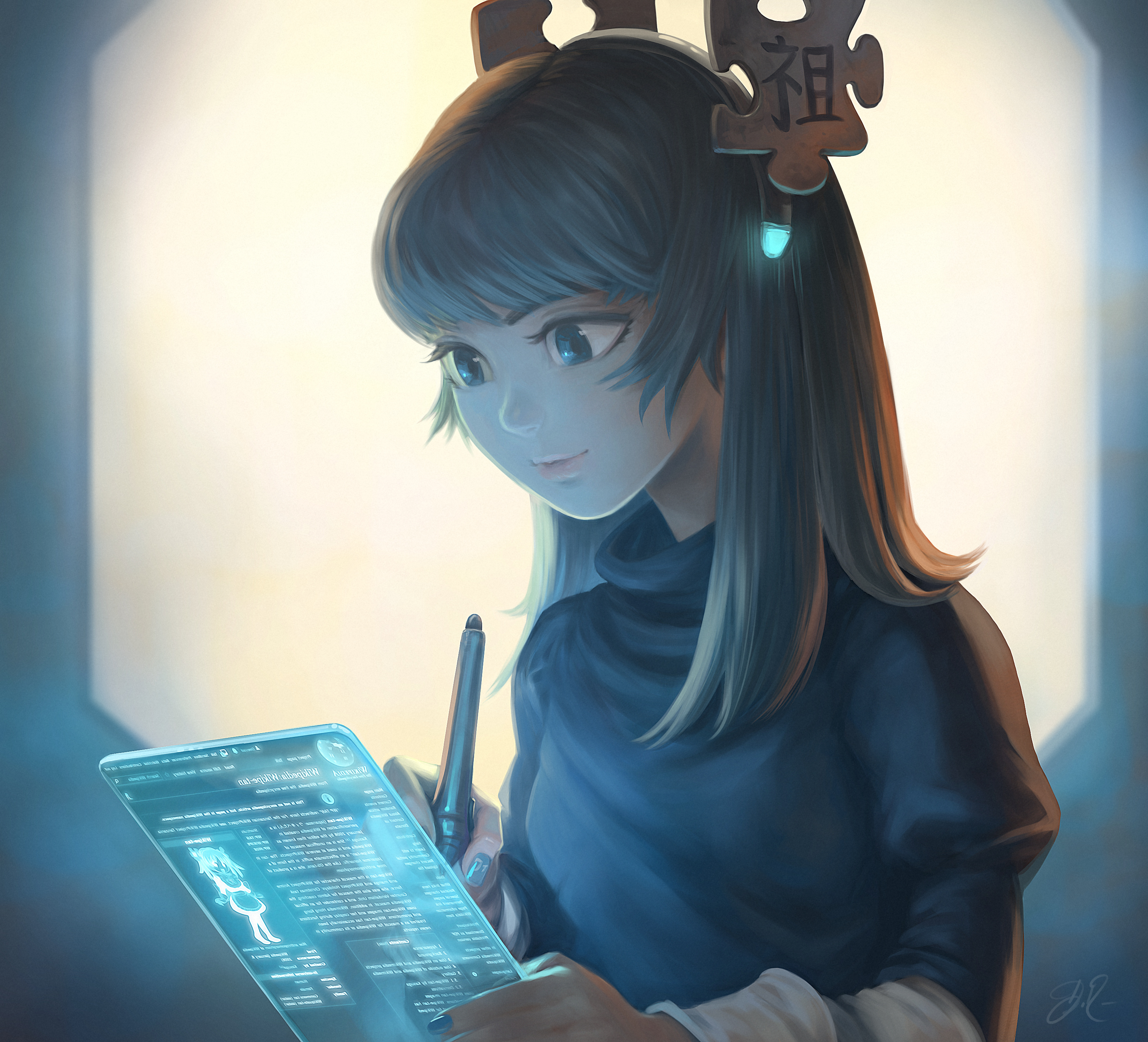
In 2012, Revoy started using Krita exclusively and In 2022, Revoy made an interpretation of Krita's mascot, Kiki (left), and published an 82-minute tutorial for how the drawing was made. In 2022, as a side project for testing a new set of brushes and workflow, Revoy remixed the mascot Wikipe-tan (right). He wanted to portray her as "a focused reader and editor".

Revoy uses free and open-source software (FOSS). However, even since having paid more than €3000 on software licenses for proprietary software, he rejects the notion that it is primarily a question about money. Though practicality, low cost and possibility to work on lower end hardware were initial motivators for Revoy to move from proprietary software to free software, in 2020 he said that there were even better reasons. He then rather referred to the benefits of control, performance and standards, transparency, and control over data and privacy. Among the cons he listed that he depends on hardware being compatible with Linux, which may be more difficult to find and not well documented.

=== Background ===
In a 2016 interview, Revoy conveyed that he used Photoshop and Corel Painter for 10 years (and Manga Studio and Sony Vegas) until a computer purchase in 2009 which included Windows Vista. The OS upgrade then required he buy upgrades for the proprietary software he was using, which totaled to an investment of a full month's salary, just for compatibility and with no additional features. Revoy commented on the experience saying "That was a really bad week: [I] had to spend a lot of money and my productivity was totally ruined."

He sold the new computer and bought one that could still run Windows XP, but realized it was not a viable long-term solution. In 2004, Revoy had tried a Knoppix distribution with KDE 3.0 and was impressed with it. After the failed computer purchase in 2009, Revoy started to move away from using Windows by configuring a dual boot with Linux Mint 4.0, compiling Wacom driver, modifying Xorg, and writing a Xsetwacom script to handle his Cintiq 12Wx. He kept Photoshop CS2 running on Wine to handle CMYK and files from publishers.

He then switched to Linux and got involved in free software projects like MyPaint and Gimp-painter (a fork of GIMP), and later Krita. In 2012, he started using Krita exclusively.

=== Contributions ===
Other than just using Krita, he reported bugs (over 200 bugs as of May 2015), helped other artists with it, and demonstrated new features.

In 2018, the Krita foundation sponsored Revoy to work on the default brush kit for Krita 4.0. Revoy merged his brushkit with brushes made with feedback from the community as well as brushes submitted by several other users. In 2023 he shared an updated pack of 38 brushes and published a video explaining how they work.

In 2023, Revoy updated an ongoing article which chronicles his more than 20-year-long use of graphics tablets, and outlined the design of what he considered would be a perfect tablet. In 2024, he published a post-installation guide for his setup.

== Work process ==
In 2016, Revoy had his own render farm that he used for rendering the pages of Pepper & Carrot, then ImageMagick and Inkscape glue speech bubbles to the images on the render farm. Using a GitHub repository, Revoy collaborates with the translators and other parts of the community and shares assets.

== Other work and use ==
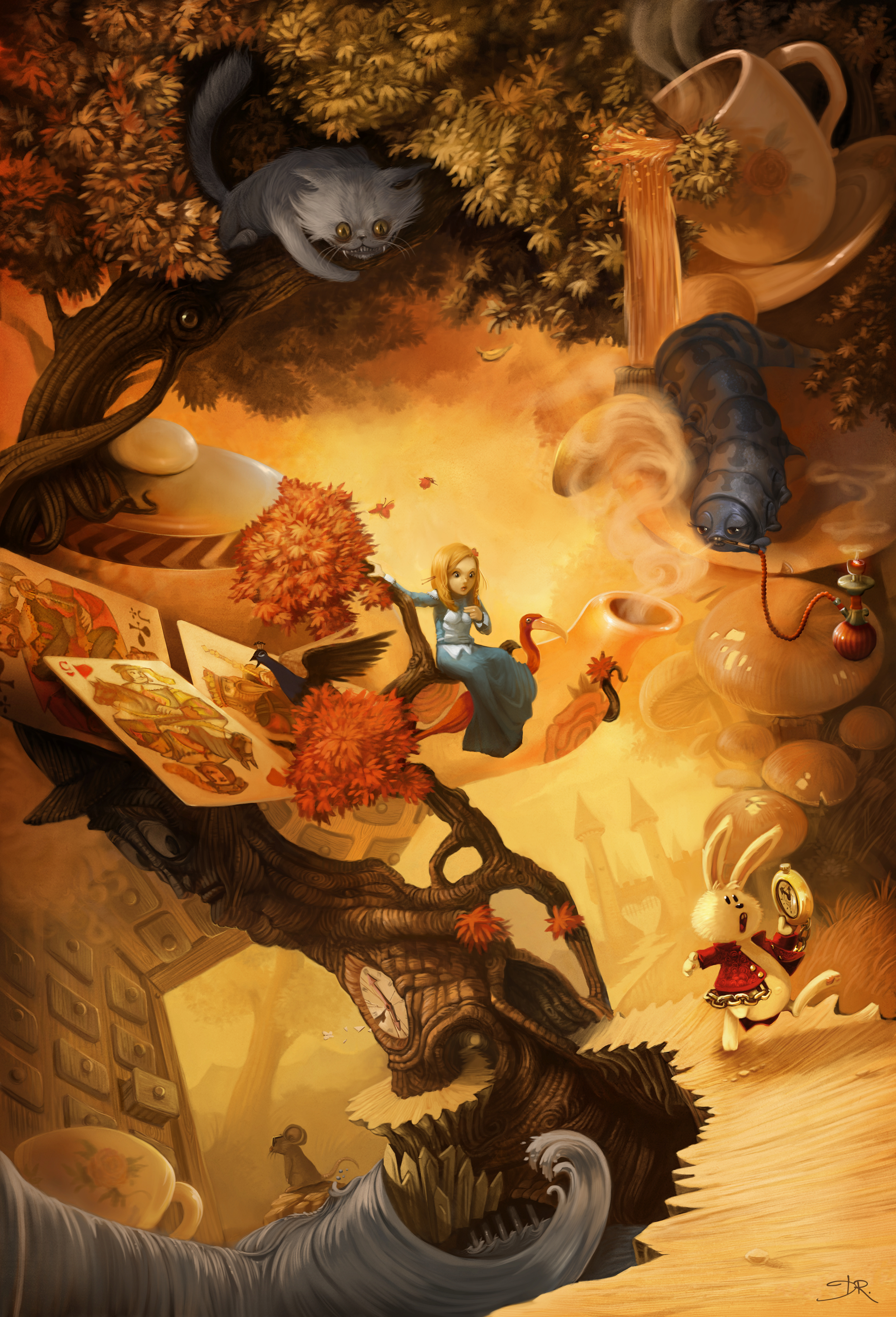
Revoy received the CG Choice Award for his 2010 work "Alice in Wonderland". In 2022, he re-licensed it from CC BY-NC-ND to the more permissive CC BY 4.0 international.

External image
- Yin and Yang of world hunger, published in September 2010, is one of David Revoy's most famous works and one of few of Revoy's works licensed under CC-BY-NC-ND.

External image
- Fantasy Landscape, published in January 2007, won the CGallery Trophy in 2009 and is another one of few of Revoy's works licensed under CC-BY-NC-ND.

Revoy mostly creates original work, but also remixes other public domain and free works, for example Alice in Wonderland or Wikipe-tan. One of his most famous works is "Yin and Yang of World Hunger", a 2010 remix of the yin and yang symbol, which generated both admiration and negative comments.

Revoy's images have been used in research described as "training a computer to turn pencil sketches into cleaned line-art." In 2022, Revoy had noted that his 2006 work "Narcissus & Echo" was popular among scholars, and for use in theses and books about mythology, but tracking royalties and granting permissions for editing it was becoming cumbersome. He then released an updated version under a more free license.

On his blog, he publishes many of his works, often in high resolution and under permissive Creative Commons licenses. Some work, which Revoy prefers not be used for commercial or political purposes without his approval, are published under more restrictive licenses.

Revoy publishes tutorials, time-lapse videos, and speed-painting videos showing his work process. He has published descriptions of his hardware and software setup.

23 October – 11 November 2023, Bulles à croquer organized a large exhibition at an E.Leclerc supermarket in Plérin. The exhibition was called "Un monde magique" ("A Magic World"). 70 of Revoy's work were displayed in large print. Quality upgrades were required and upscaling was performed using G'MIC.

Revoy has started a less serial, more anthological comic also set in Hereva called Mini Fantasy Theater. It is intended as a spiritual sequel or companion series to Pepper&Carrot as the original comic's run continues into the mid-2020s.

"An Act of Resistance", episode 34 from David Revoy's Mini Fantasy Theater series.

== Inspiration and aspirations ==
Revoy has expressed admiration for artists like Yoshitaka Amano who are able to work in several fields. After Akira Toriyama passed in 2024, Revoy wrote that Toriyama was probably the artist that influenced him the most when he started drawing.

In 2015, Revoy expressed a long-term vision to create an animation studio which only produces works under free licenses. For the top tier, named "Hereva studio" on one of Revoy's crowdfunding sites, Revoy aspires to hire CG professionals to make an animated web series and an open online school.

== Financing ==
To finance his work, Revoy accepts donations via Patreon, Liberapay, Tipeee, PayPal, and wire transfers.

== Image gallery ==
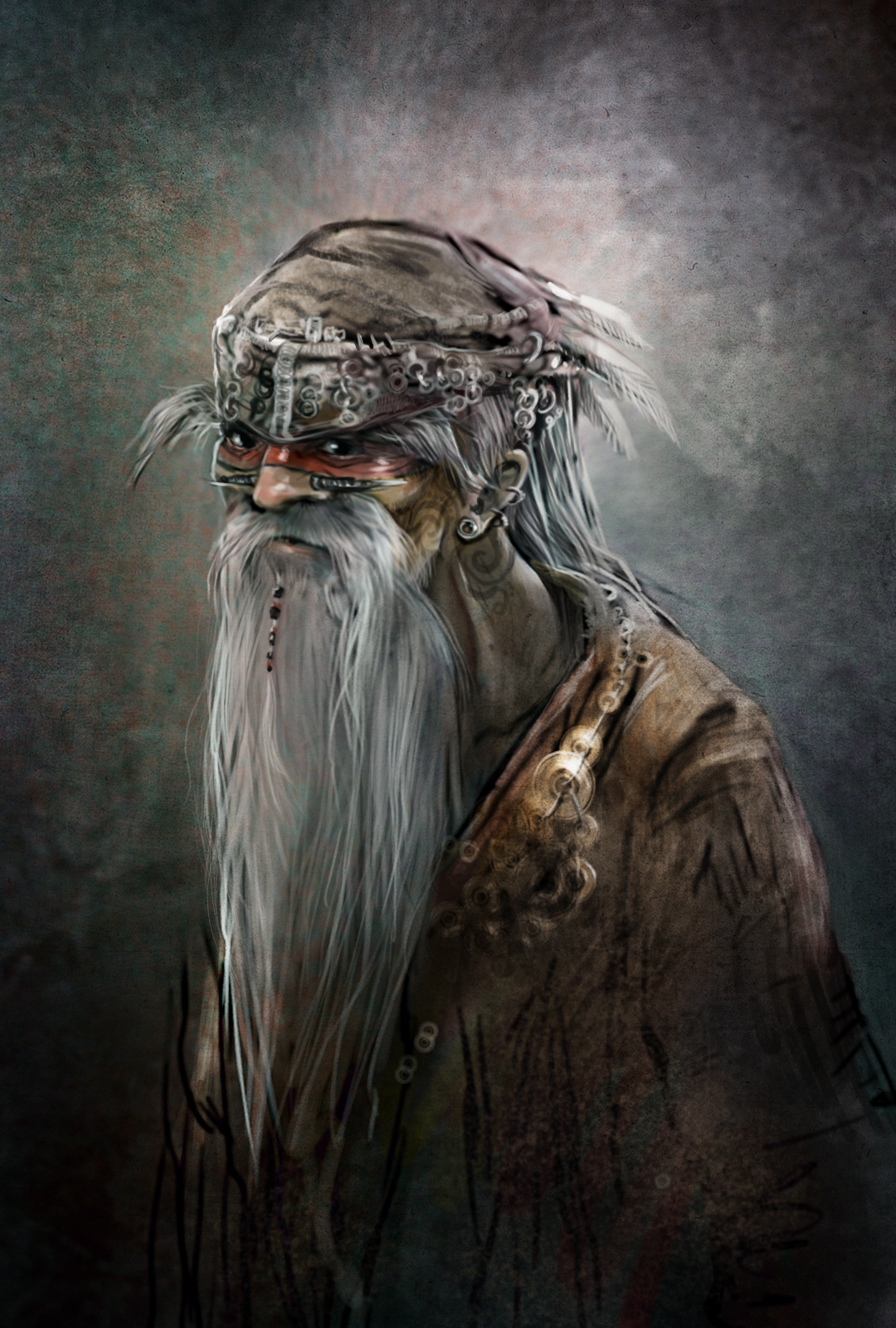
Concept art for the animated short film Sintel (2010)

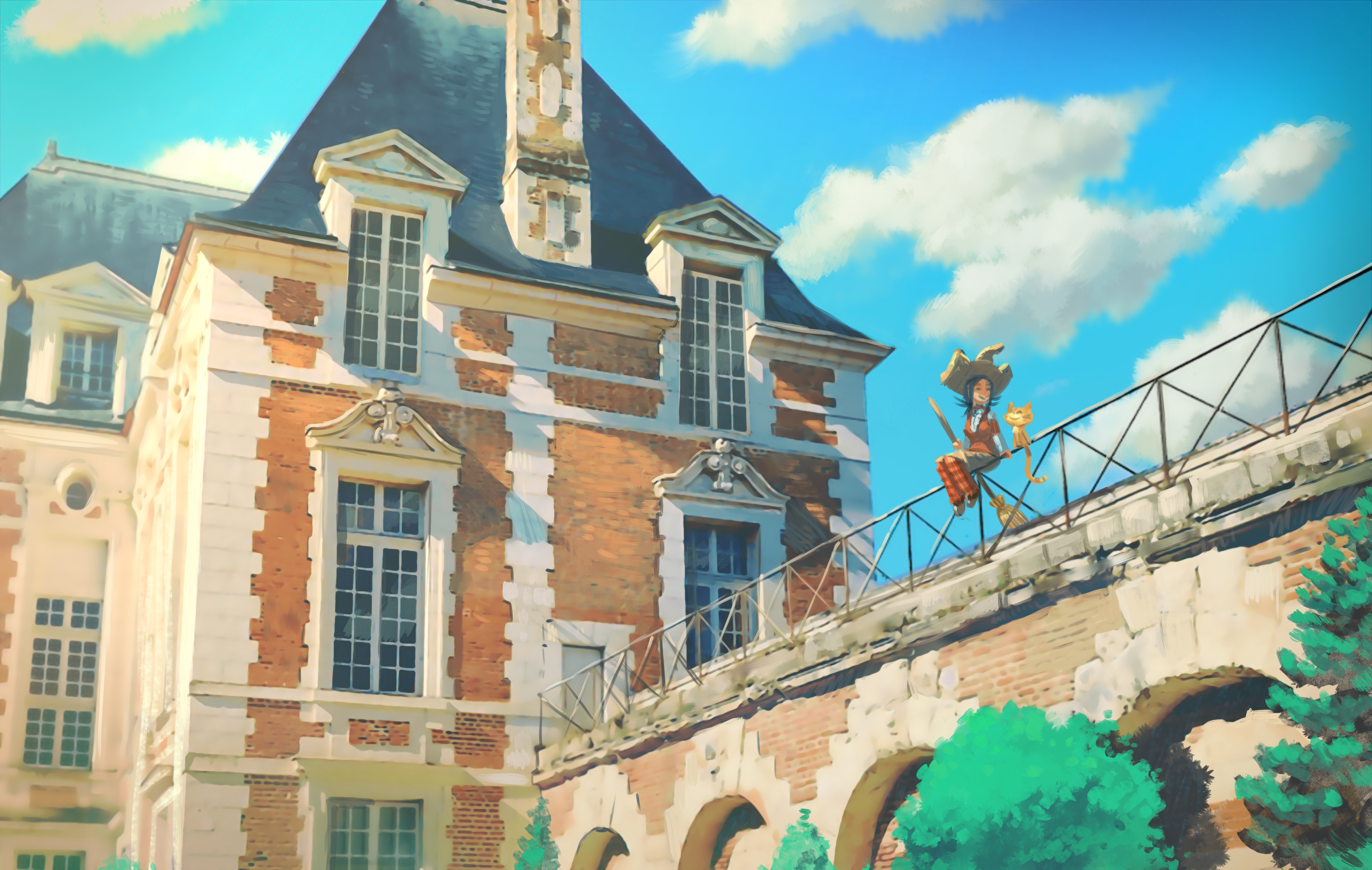
A 2018 illustration of Pepper and Carrot

A time lapse video by Revoy, showing his work process

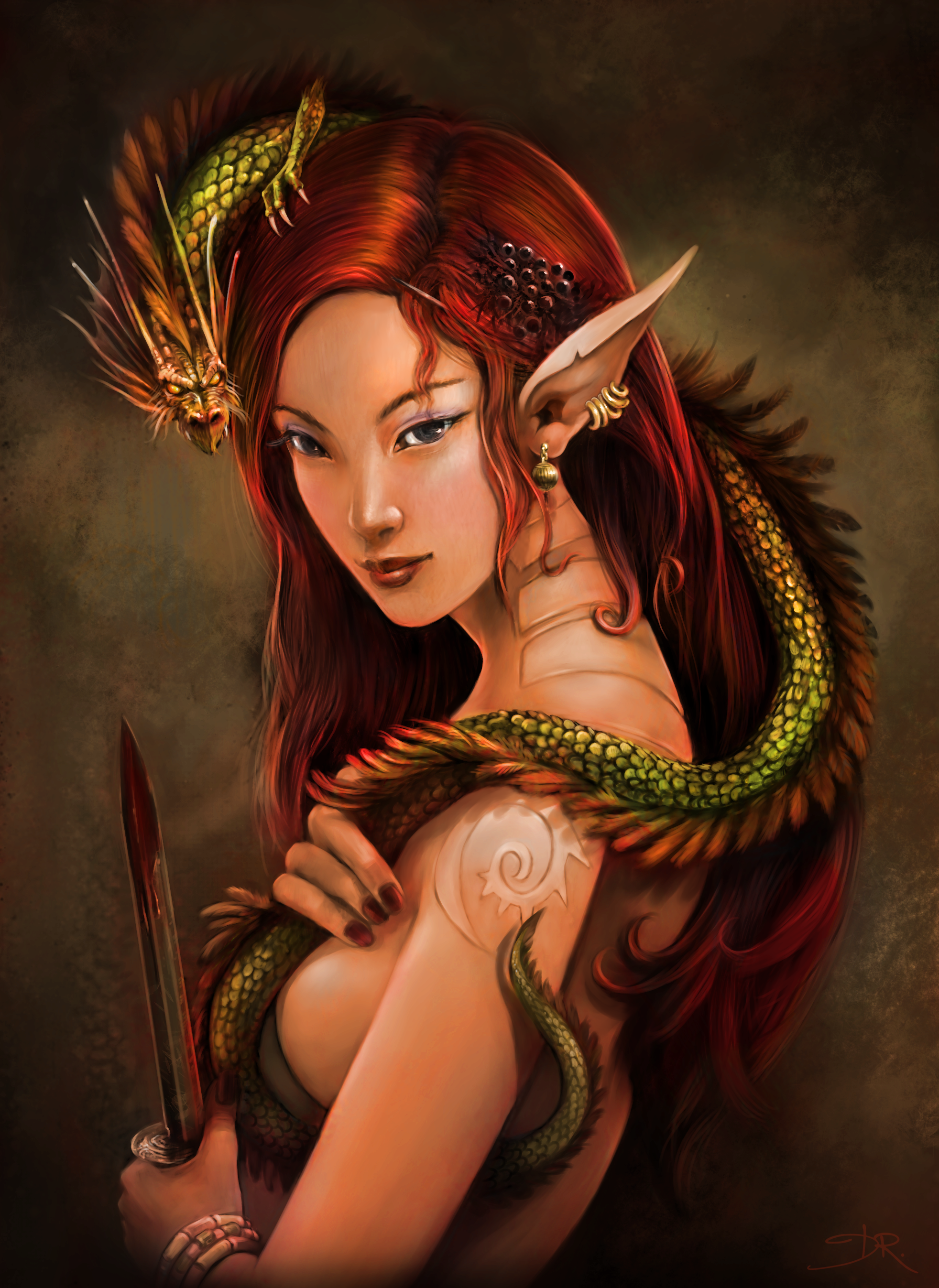
2010 artwork from a digital painting workshop

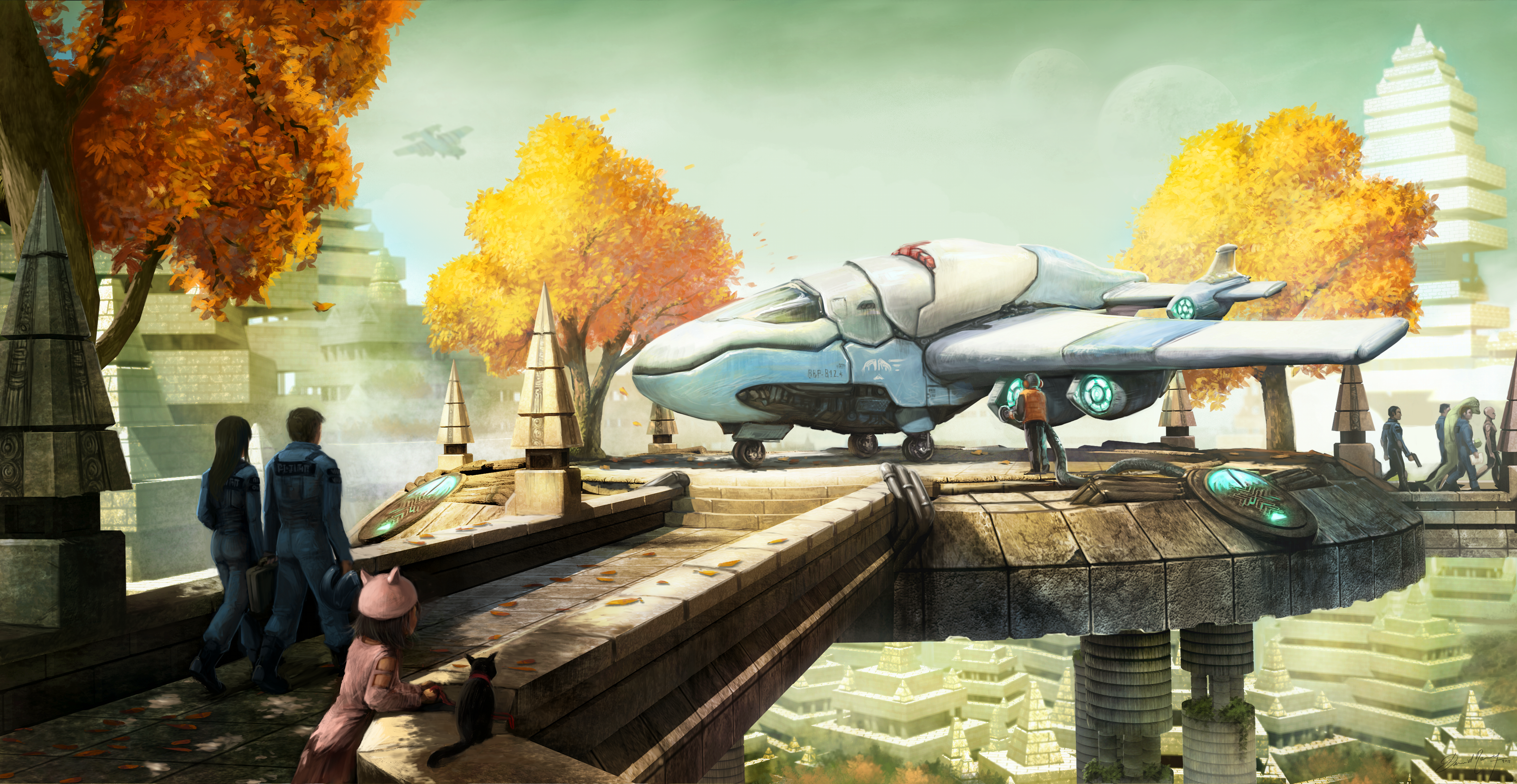
"Mission" (2011), an illustration of a futuristic aircraft on a landing pad

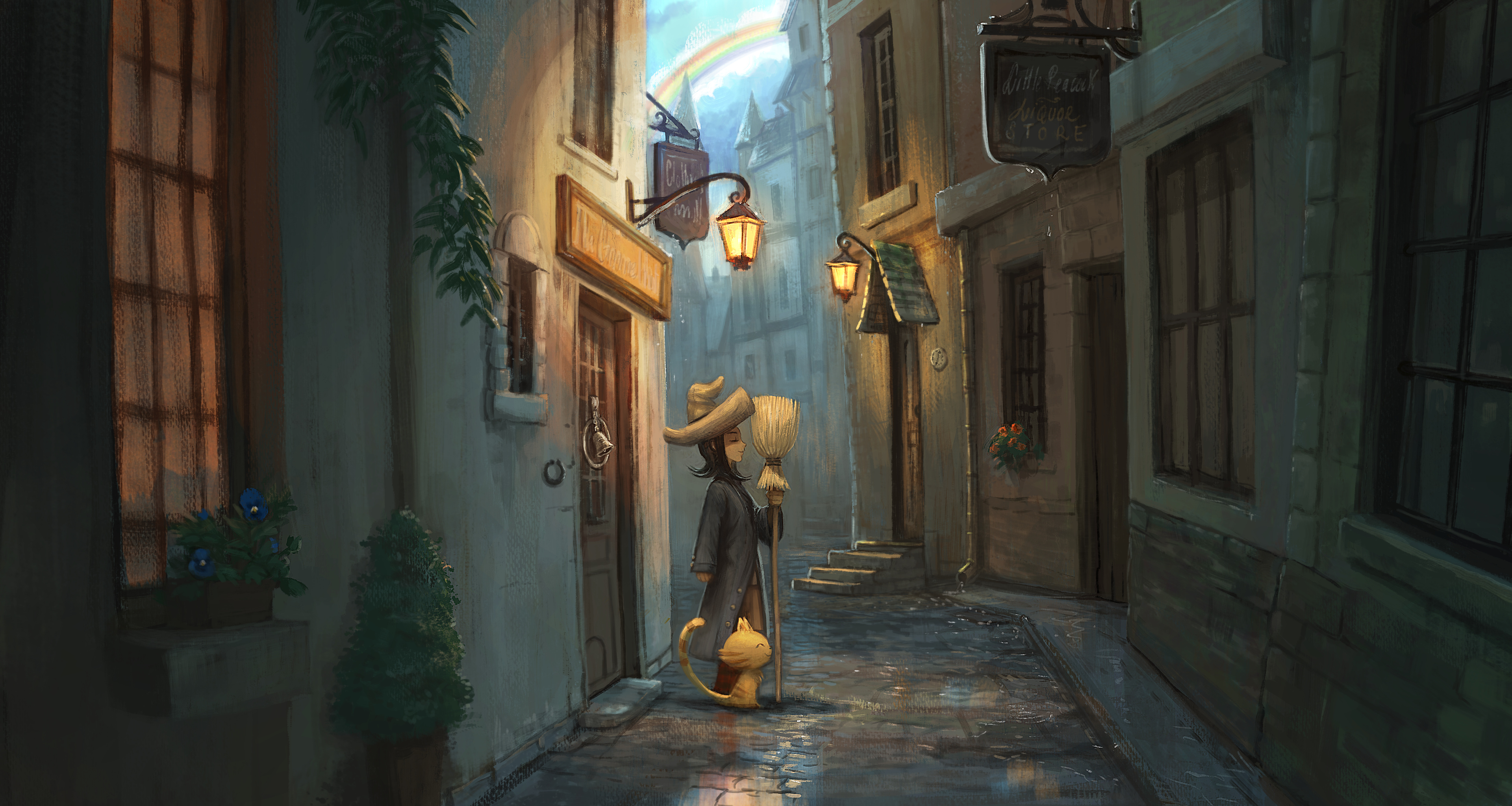
"The after rain smell" (2023) illustrating petrichor

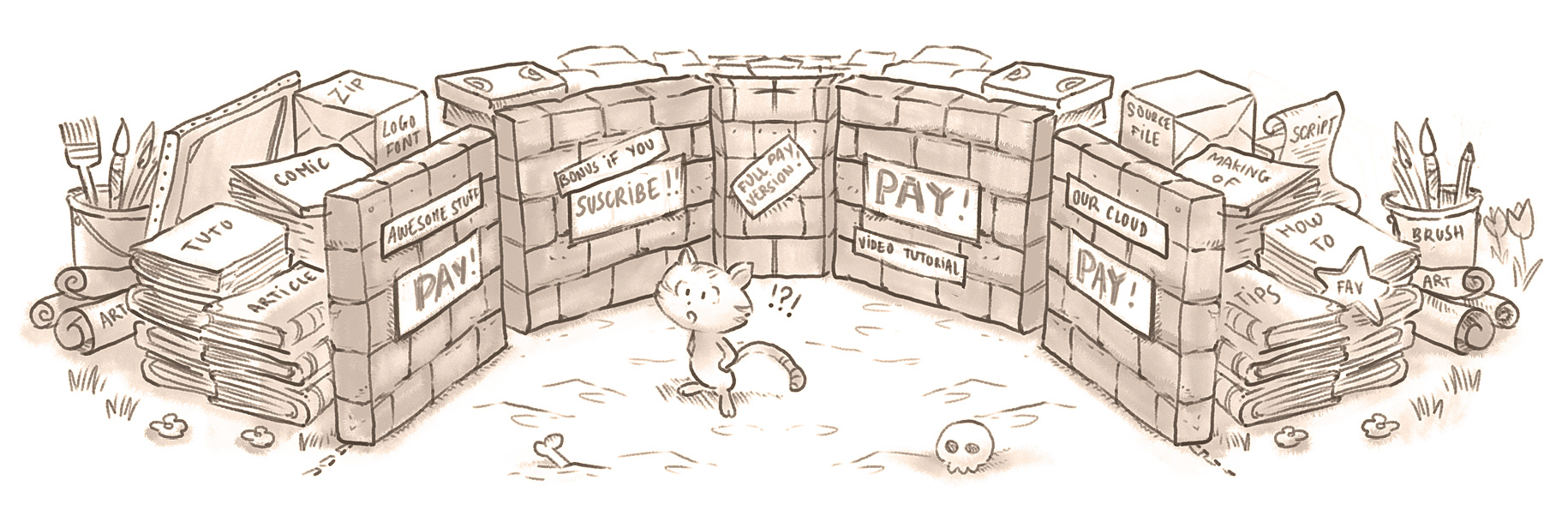
The character Carrot in an illustration of several paywalls

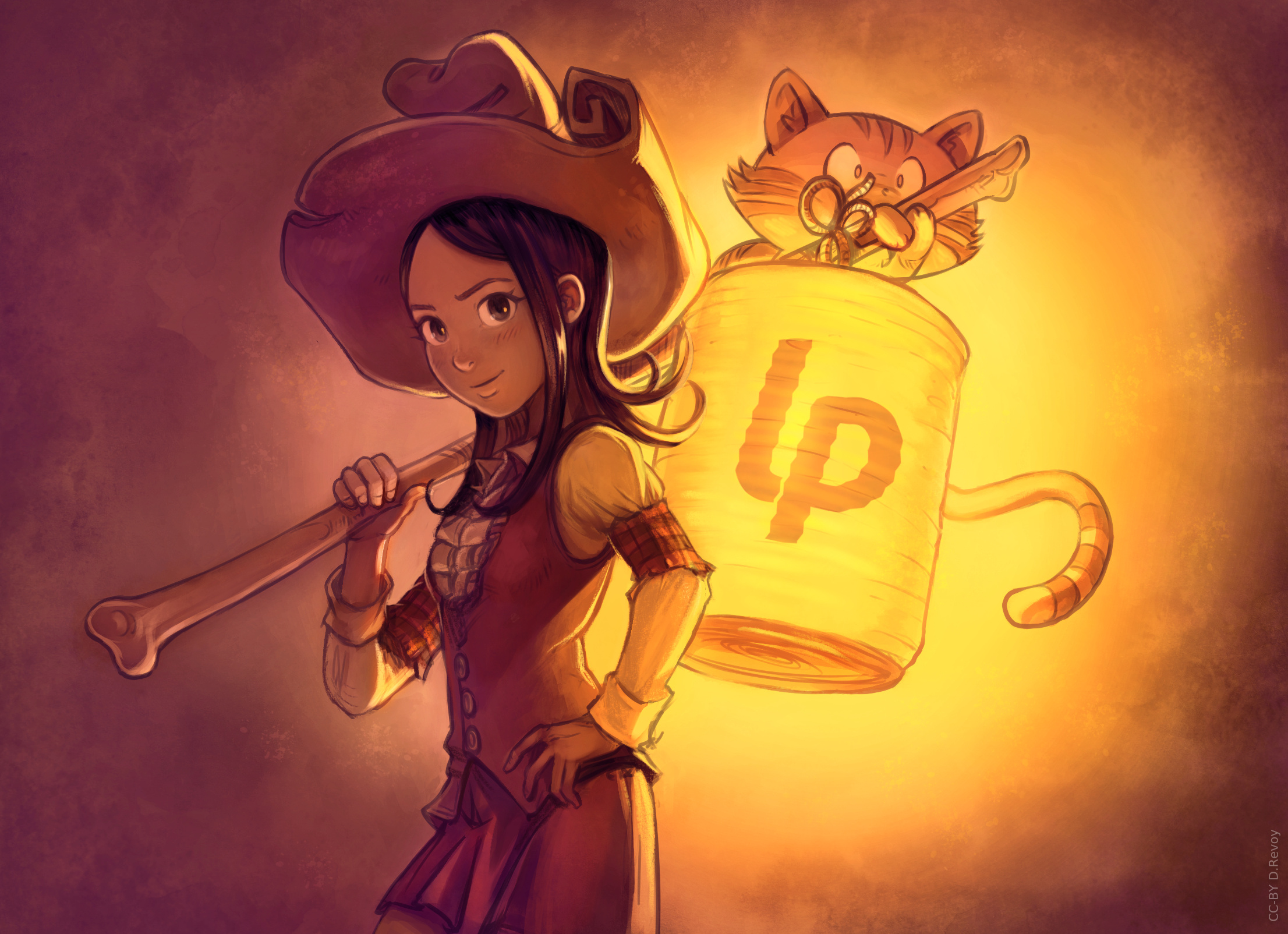
"Liberapay Lantern" (2017) illustrating Revoy finances his work via donations

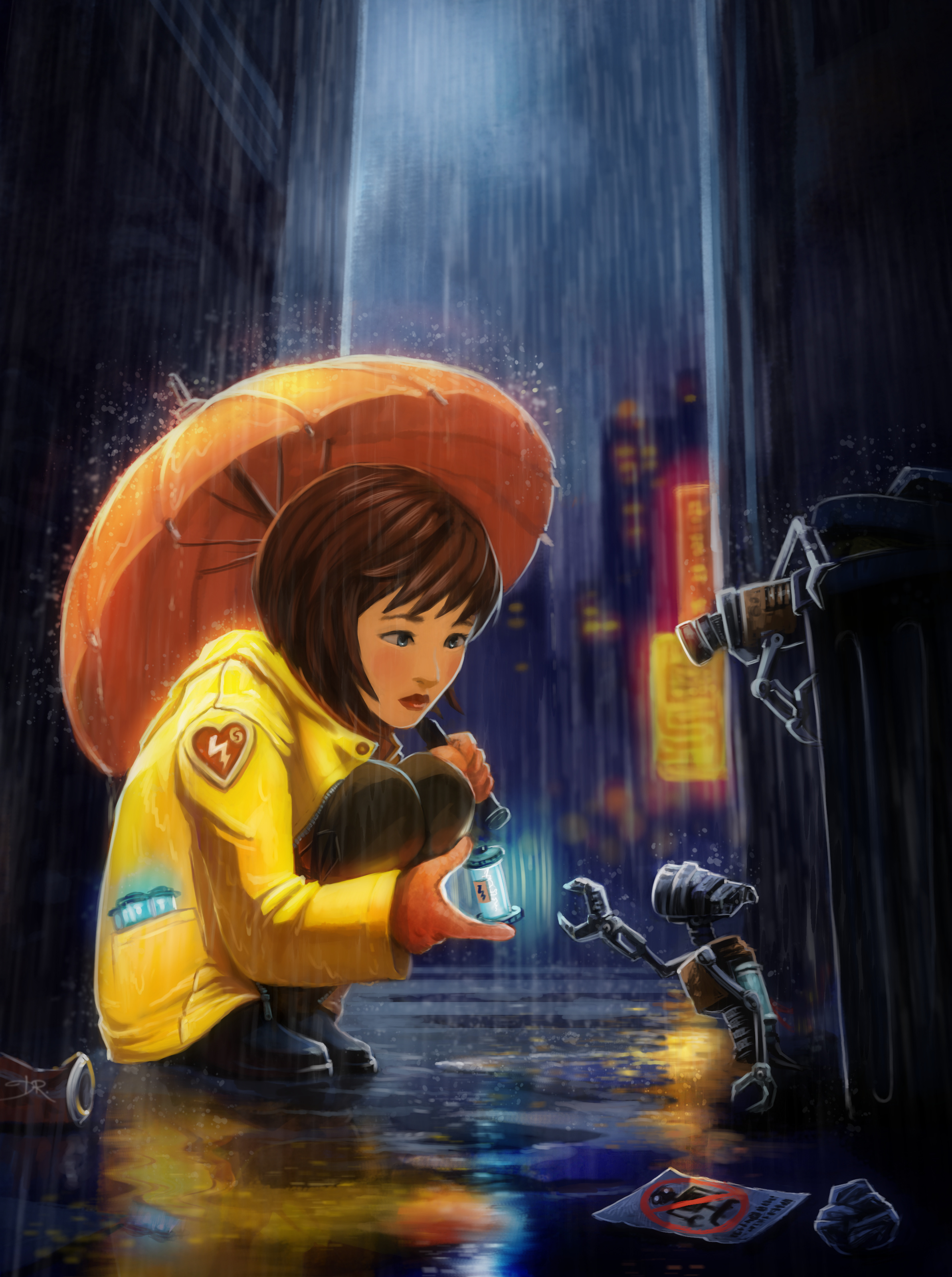
"Electron Donor" (2010)

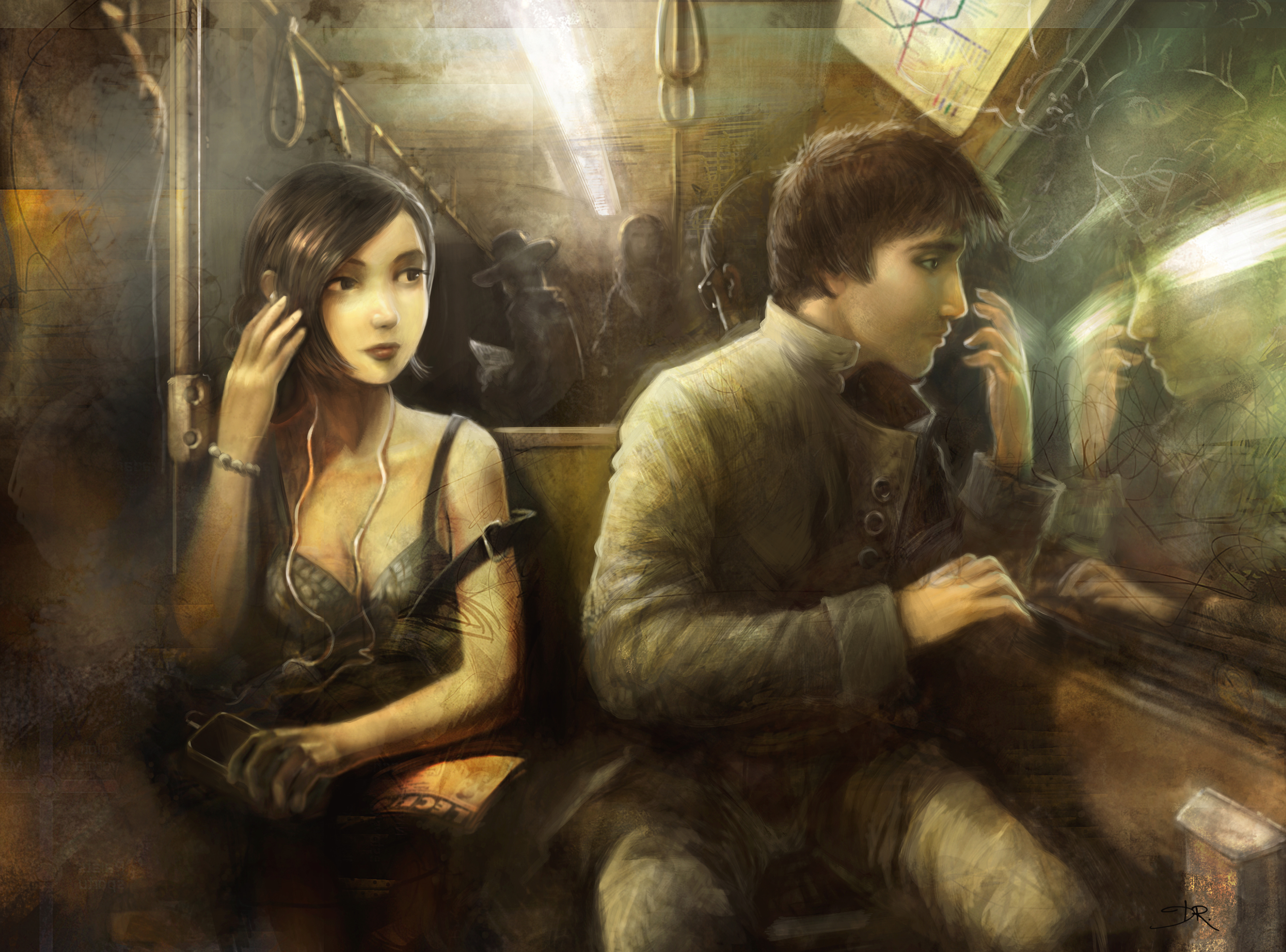
"Narcissus & Echo", a 2022 remix of Revoy's own work from 2006

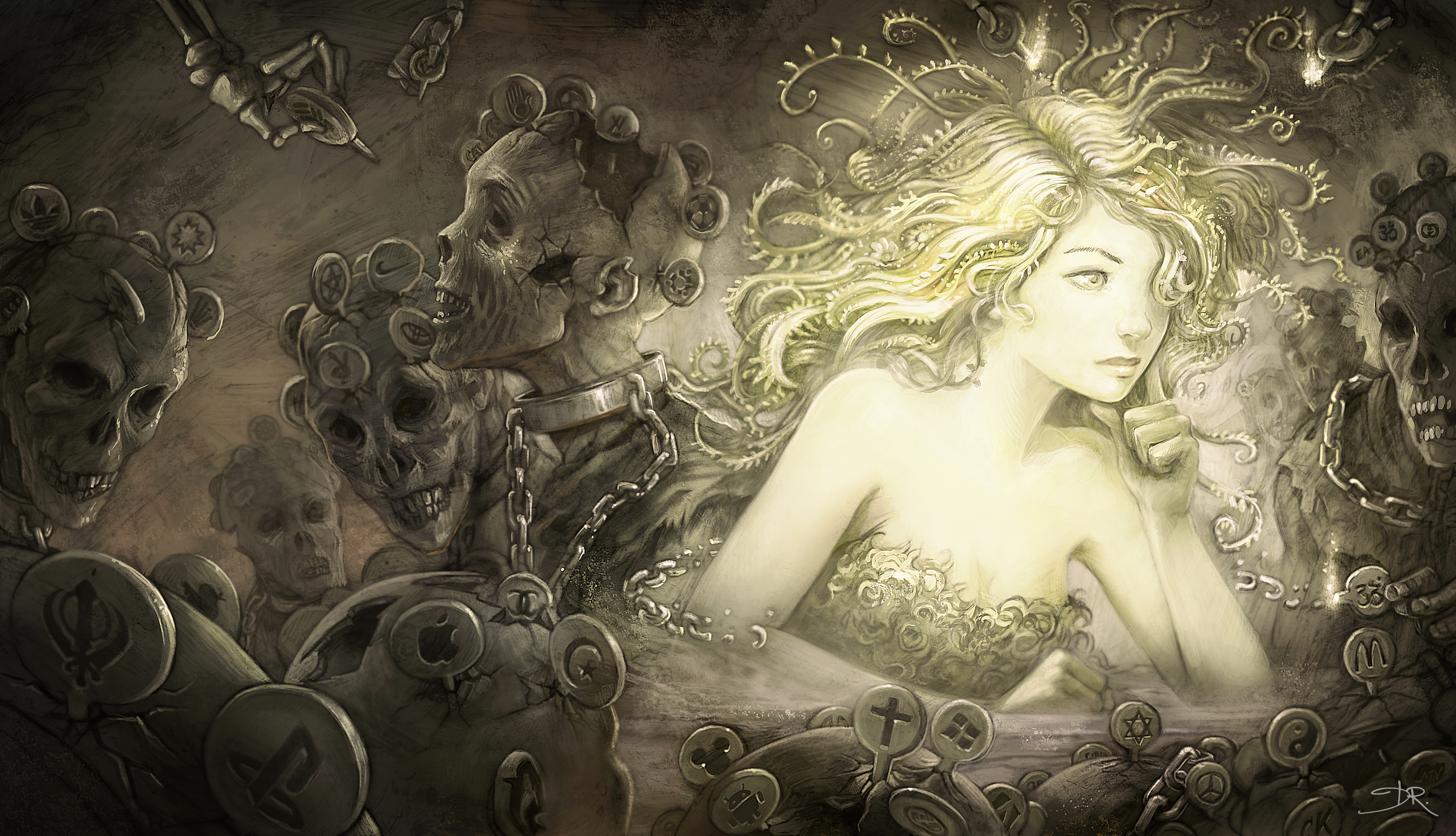
"Grow your own ideas" (2013), a plea to form opinions independently

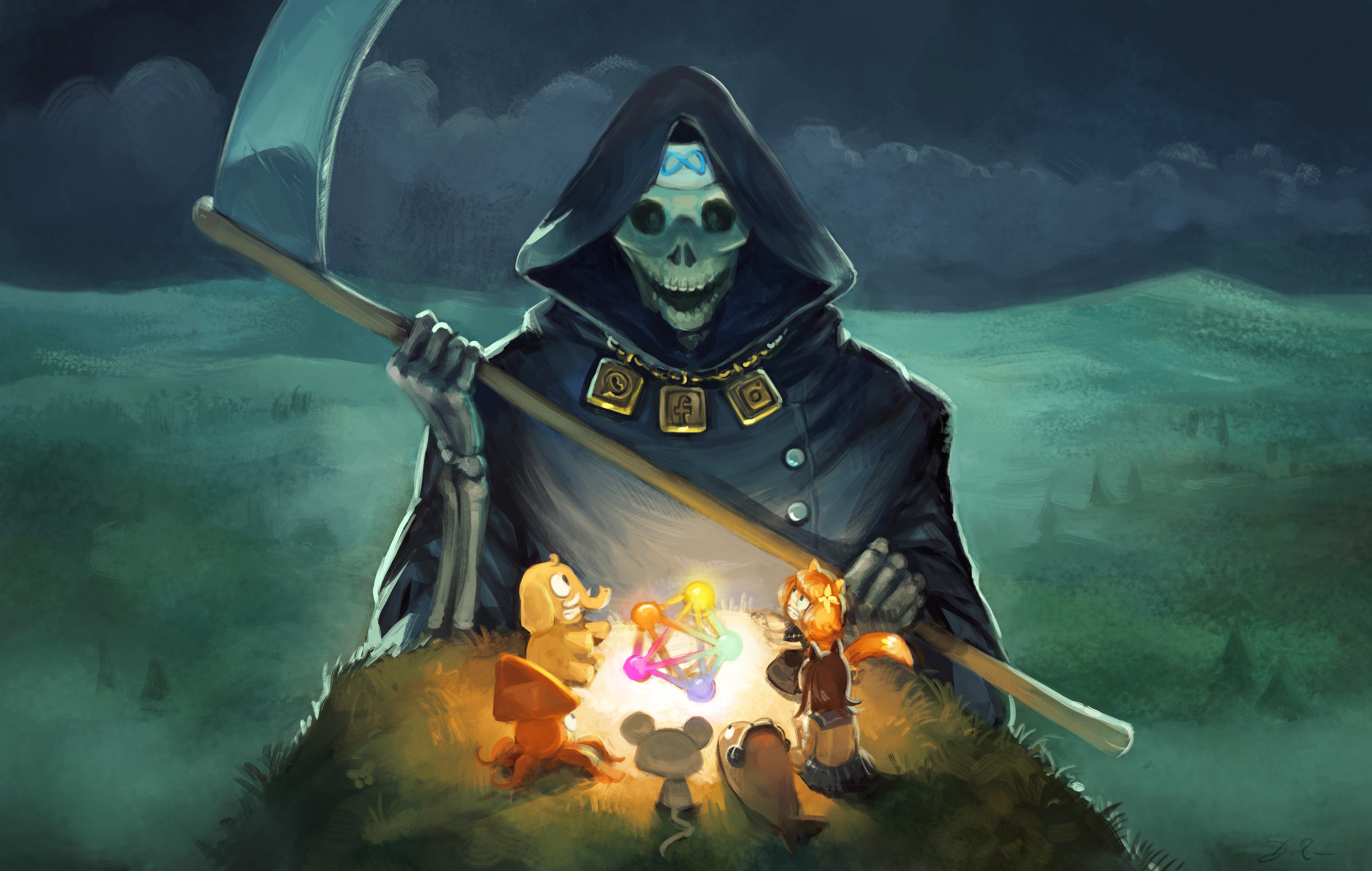
"MAY I JOIN YOU" (2023), a comment on a contemporary online culture event
