= Liberapay =

Nonprofit crowd-funding platform for recurrent unconditional donations

- Website type: Crowdfunding platform
- Available in: 30+ languages
- Website: liberapay.com
- Launched: February 3, 2016; 10 years ago
- Content license: open-source software, mostly CC0 and MIT licensed
- Written in: Python

Liberapay is a non-profit platform for recurrent donations. It is maintained by a non-profit organization of the same name, registered in Querrien, France in 2015.

Liberapay is primarily aimed at funding free and open-source software, artists and content creators, though other uses are allowed.

The service does not charge a fee on donations.

There is a git repository for both its source code and the non-profit organization's information.

== Service ==
The service does not charge a fee on donations, aside from that required by the underlying payment processors. Instead, Liberapay is supported by donations handled by its own service. As of October 2020, Liberapay used payment processors PayPal and Stripe.

Liberapay has been compared to Patreon. Unlike other crowdfunding platforms, Liberapay does not allow creators to reward their patrons. This difference in the nature of the transactions has tax implications. For example, Patreon collects VAT on all payments made from inside the European Union whereas Liberapay does not.

== History ==
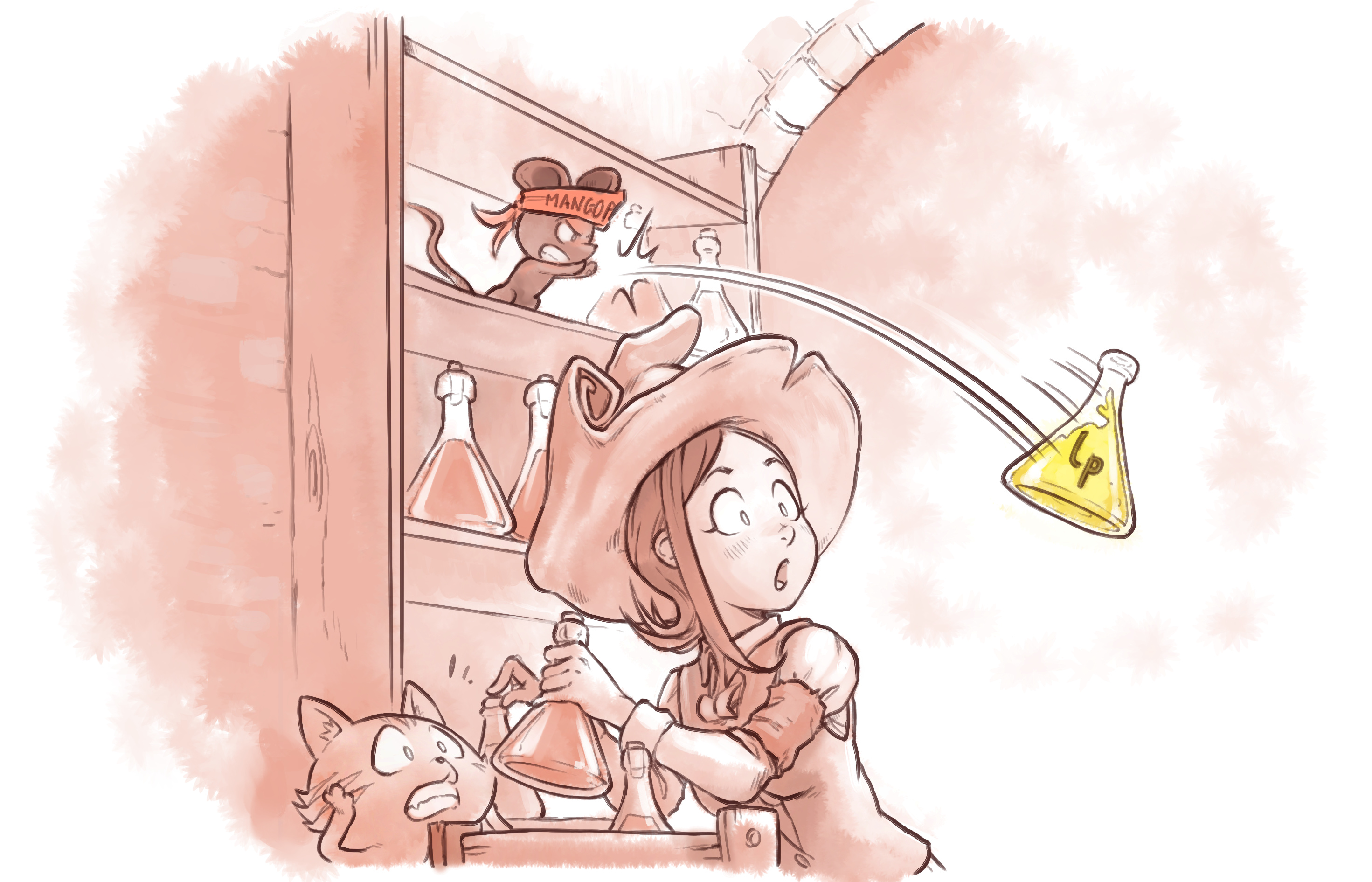
David Revoy cartoon of Mangopay's abrupt departure as payment processor

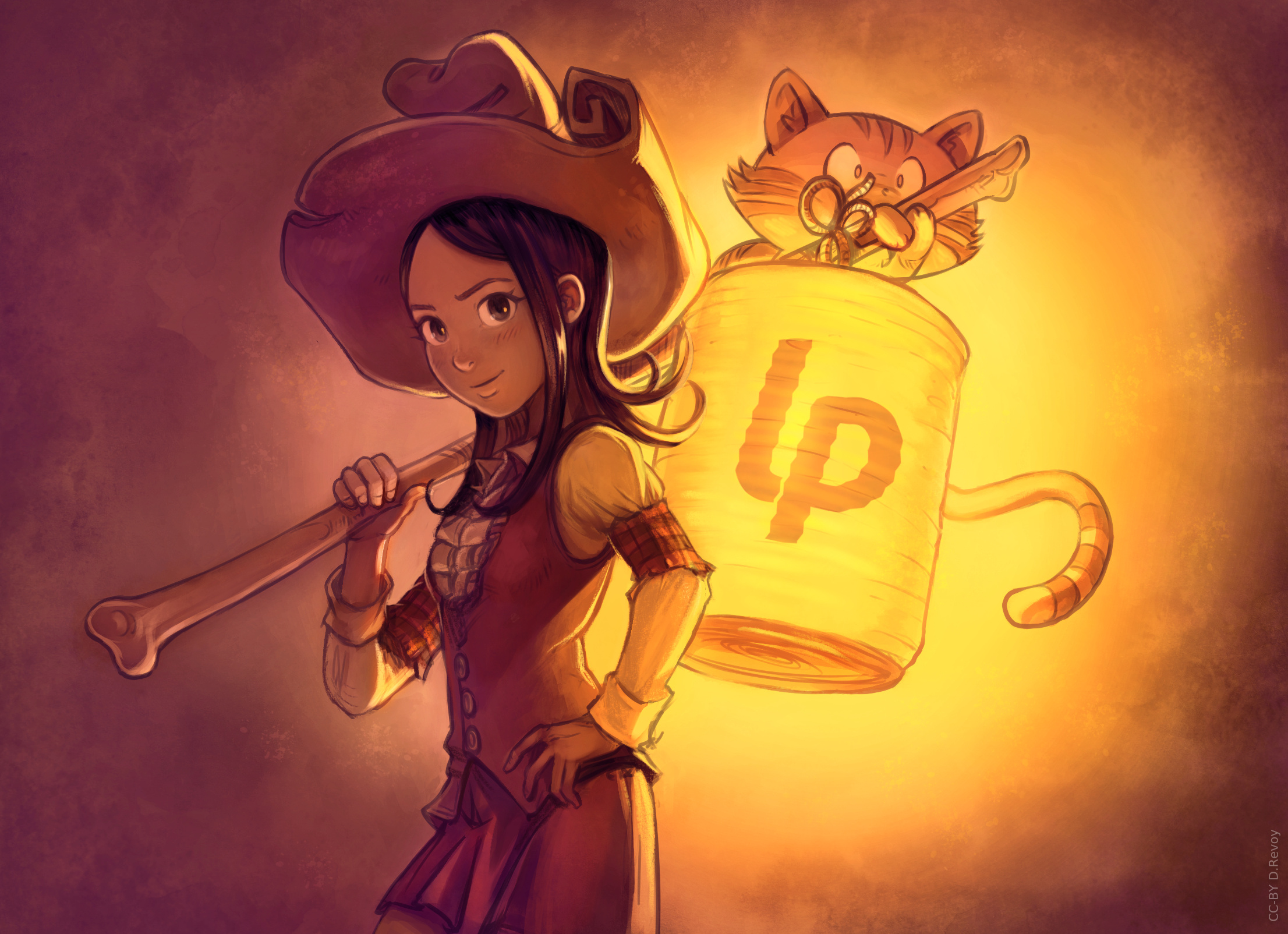

Started in 2015 in France, Liberapay began as an open-source fork of the now-defunct US-based platform Gratipay.com (originally known as Gittip), which had undergone changes after facing legal issues. At the end of that year, the operators of the platform established a nonprofit organization under the 1901 law of associations.

Initially, Liberapay's only supported currency was the euro. Support for the US dollar was added in December 2017 (one month after Gratipay announced that it would shut down); support for 31 other currencies was added in 2018.

In 2018, Liberapay had to respond to Mangopay withdrawing its services as payment processor. Support for two other payment processors was added, but the way the platform works had to change. In the same year Medium briefly suspended the organisation's blog account, claiming they were publishing articles about cryptocurrencies.

In January 2021, Liberapay announced donations reached €8000 per week, a 150% year over year increase, with 5977 patrons and 912 creators.

In 2022, Liberapay started using machine translation services to automatically complete the translations of its website.

== Reception ==
In 2018, Jason van Gumster writing for RedHat's Opensource said distinguishing factors of Liberapay were target audience, Open Source, lack of fees on payments, and non-profit status. F-Droid announced support for Liberapay and integration of support for apps.
