= Mangopay =

French payments company

- Industry: Fintech
- Founded: 2013
- Founder: Celine Lazorthes and Romain Mazeries
- Headquarters: Luxembourg
- Key people: Sergi Herrero (CEO); Carlos Sanchez Arruti (CFO); Xavier Garambois (Executive Chairman)
- Owner: Advent International
- Number of employees: c. 500 (2024)
- Website: mangopay.com

Mangopay is a payments company providing modular infrastructure technology for e-commerce platforms, particularly online marketplaces and platforms, such as Vinted, Chrono24, Rakuten, and La Redoute.

Mangopay is licensed in the EU/EEA by the CSSF (Commission de Surveillance du Secteur Financier) and in the UK by the FCA (Financial Conduct Authority).

In November 2023, Mangopay became authorised as an Electronic Money Institution (EMI) by the Financial Conduct Authority (FCA).

In October 2023, the company was named one of FXC Intelligence's most promising cross-border payment companies.

In November 2023, Mangopay announced the launch of its FX product to provide multi-currency pricing, local settlements and treasury management for clients to offer cross-border payments.

In May 2024, Mangopay announced the launch of its payment processor-agnostic Fraud Prevention solution to defend against threats, including account takeover, reseller fraud, payment fraud, chargebacks, and returns abuse.

Mangopay offers application programming interfaces (APIs) enabling developers to incorporate payment capabilities into their platforms and applications. Mangopay's products are modular, allowing clients to select specific components to set up their desired payments flow.

== History ==
Mangopay was launched in 2013 and was a spin off from Leetchi.com, which was founded by Celine Lazorthes in Paris, in 2009.

In 2015, Mangopay and Leetchi.com were acquired by French bank Crédit Mutuel Arkéa.

In 2018, Romain Mazeries was appointed to the position of Mangopay CEO.

In April 2022, Mangopay was acquired by private equity firm Advent International, which injected €75m of primary capital.

In November of the same year, the company acquired Polish anti-fraud specialist Nethone for an undisclosed sum. Its acquisition added cybercrime protection to Mangopay's suite of services.

In March 2023, Mangopay acquired Dublin-based payments startup WhenThen for an undisclosed sum. In the same month, the company was named as the Best Platform and Marketplace Provider at the Merchant Payments Ecosystem (MPE) Awards.

In July 2024, Mangopay was named in the world's top 250 fintech companies by CNBC.

In September 2024, Mangopay announced the appointment of former global director for payments and commerce partnerships at Meta Sergi Herrero as CEO.
