= Skyworks Interactive =

Defunct American video game developer

- Industry: Video game industry
- Founded: 1995; 31 years ago in United States
- Founders: David Crane and Garry Kitchen
- Defunct: 2014
- Products: Arcade Hoops Basketball
- Subsidiaries: Advergame.com

Skyworks Interactive, Inc., formerly Skyworks Technologies, was a video game developer established in 1995, best known for producing advergames for websites.

It was established by David Crane and Garry Kitchen in 1995, following the shutdown of Absolute Entertainment. The two jointly developed the advergaming business model, where their games were played for free, but licensed to other companies' websites. Their first gaming portal was Candystand, launched in 1997 by The Lifesavers Company. The website evolved from a premium CD-ROM Skyworks developed for Lifesavers the previous year, which raised interest between the two parties involved to create a dedicated website.

Skyworks later launched further advergaming websites following on from Candystand's success: NabiscoWorld in 1999 followed by Postopia and TooMunchFun in 2001. As of 2003, Skyworks had a catalog of 60 proprietary games which were later reskinned depending on the needs of the sponsor. The target received an exclusivity clause for the sector it operated (soft drink, food, etc.) and integrate its branding to the game.

In 2005, Skyworks formed its subsidiary Advergame.com, due to the growth of its non-advergame activities. In August 2006, it was announced that Gottaplay was acquiring Skyworks. In 2007, ESPN took over the rights of Skyworks' sports game website, Rcade.com, being renamed ESPN Arcade in the process. Subsequently in 2009, Arkadium bought Advergame.com, as Skyworks had been auctioning off its domain name.

In late 2008, Skyworks entered the iPhone business with the release of their first game title, Arcade Hoops Basketball.

In 2010, the company filed for bankruptcy. It closed in 2014.
