= Game creation system =

Special software used to make video games

A game creation system (GCS) is a game engine that is targeted towards the consumer, for the purpose of creating a user-derived video game. It contains a set of specialized design tools to make a video game, and sometimes also a light scripting language.

Unlike developer-oriented game engines, game creation systems allow an easy entry point for novice or hobbyist game designers, with often little to no coding required for simple behaviors. Although initially stigmatized, all-in-one game creation systems have gained some legitimacy with the role of Unity, Pixel Game Maker MV, and GameMaker in the growth of the indie game development community. Currently the Independent Games Festival recognizes games produced with similar platforms.

Early game creation systems such as Broderbund's The Arcade Machine (1982), Pinball Construction Set (1983), ASCII's War Game Construction Kit (1983), Thunder Force Construction (1984), Adventure Construction Set (1984), Garry Kitchen's GameMaker (1985), Wargame Construction Set (1986), Shoot-'Em-Up Construction Kit (1987), Mamirin / Dungeon Manjirou (1988), and Arcade Game Construction Kit (1988) appeared in the 1980s on home computers. 3D Construction Kit was released on the ZX Spectrum in 1991, and contained a full polygon-based world creation tool. Most of these early design frameworks are specific to one or another genre.

In the 1990s, game creation systems for the IBM PC expanded to the more general and the more specific. Whereas frameworks like RSD Game-Maker and Klik & Play attempted to accommodate any genre, communities grew around games like ZZT (later MegaZeux) that permitted extensive user modification that they essentially became de facto game creation systems. Pie in the Sky Software created a full on 2.5D first-person shooter creator out of an engine they previously used internally, which sold in three total versions until 2003; 3D GameStudio and products by The Game Creators have targeted similar creators.

In the mid-2000s, with the growth of the World Wide Web and social networking, programs like BlitzBasic and Multimedia Fusion supports the rise of interest both in indie games and in canned game design software. Whereas earlier game creation systems tend to be on the side of user friendly interfaces, 21st-century systems often have extensive scripting languages that can account for higher-skilled users. Other general purpose game creation systems include Construct, Clickteam, Buildbox, Game Editor, GameSalad, GDevelop and Stencyl.

== Features ==
=== Tools ===
Several game creation systems include some of the following tools:

- Integrated development environment: for managing projects and resources
- Command-line interface: for compiling and debugging games
- Sprite editor: for the editing of animated images commonly referred to as sprites
- Model editor: for 3D modeling purposes
- Map/Scene editor: generally used for object and tile placement

=== Scripting ===
The rise of game creation systems also saw a need for free form scripting languages with general purpose use. Some packages, such as Conitec's Gamestudio, include a more comprehensive scripting language under the surface to allow users more leeway in defining their games' behavior.

== Usage ==
While most of the mainstream and popular game creation systems may be general-purpose, several exist solely for specific genres.

- Adventure games: Adventure Master, World Builder, Adventure Game Studio, Twine, Wintermute Engine, SLUDGE
- First-person shooters: 3D Game Creation System, FPS Creator, Silent Walk FPS Creator, Raycasting Game Maker, Easy FPS Editor
- Fighting games: Fighter Maker, Mugen, IKEMEN Go
- Role-playing games: RPG Maker, Official Hamster Republic Role Playing Game Construction Engine, EasyRPG, Solarus, Sphere
- Dungeon crawlers: Forgotten Realms: Unlimited Adventures, The Bard's Tale Construction Set
- Space combat game: Wing Commander Academy
- Visual novels: Ren'Py
- Massively multiplayer online games: Roblox, Core, Rec Room
- Platform games: LittleBigPlanet, Super Mario Maker, PlataGO!, Geometry Dash
- General-purpose: Dreams, Nintendo Labo Toy-Con 04: VR Kit, Game Builder Garage, Fancade

== See also ==
- Game engine
- Level editor
