= Fan game =

Video game created by fans of a franchise

A fan game is a video game that is created by fans of a certain topic or IP. They are usually based on one, or in some cases several, video game entries or franchises. Many fan games attempt to clone or remake the original game's design, gameplay, and characters, but it is equally common for fans to develop a unique game using another as a template. Though the quality of fan games has always varied, recent advances in computer technology and in available tools, e.g. through open source software, have made creating high-quality games easier. Fan games can be seen as user-generated content, as part of the retrogaming phenomena, and as expression of the remix culture.

== Development ==
Fan games are either developed as standalone games with their own engines, or as modifications to existing games that piggyback on the other's engines. Each approach has different advantages, as standalone games are generally accessible to larger audiences but may often be more difficult or time-consuming to develop.

=== Standalone games ===
Taisei Project is an open source fan game based off of the Touhou Project series.

Fan games are often developed using pre-existing tools and game engines. The Unity engine and Adobe Flash allow fans to develop standalone games, as with other programs such as GameMaker, Construct, RPG Maker, or any of the Clickteam products (such as The Games Factory and Multimedia Fusion 2).

Fan game developers often select and use free and open source game engines (such as OGRE, Crystal Space, DarkPlaces, and Spring) to help fans create games without the cost of licensing a commercial alternative. These engines may be altered and redesigned within the terms of their open source license and often cost significantly less than commercial options, but do not always allow developers to easily create high-end visual effects without additional effort.

It is also possible for fans to develop original game engines from scratch using a programming language such as C++, although doing so takes much more time and technical ability than modifying an existing game; an example is the Spring Engine which started as a fan-made Total Annihilation game.

=== Modifications to existing games ===
Fan games are sometimes developed as a modification to an existing game, using features and software provided by many game engines. Mods usually are not allowed to modify the original story and game graphics, but rather extend the current content that was provided by the original developer. Modding an existing game is often cheaper than developing a fan game from scratch.

Because of the complexity of developing an entirely new game, fan games are often made using pre-existing tools that either came with the original game, or are readily available elsewhere. Certain games, such as Unreal Tournament 2004 and Neverwinter Nights, come with map-editing and scripting tools to allow fans to develop mods using the engine provided with the original game. Games such as Doom are old enough (end-of-life) that their source code has been released, allowing radical changes to take place; more examples in the List of commercial video games with available source code.

Another form of modding comes from editing the ROM images of older games, such as SNES games. Programs such as Lunar Magic enable a user to modify the existing data in the ROM image and change levels, character graphics, or any other aspect the program allows. While normally played on emulators, these newly edited ROM images could theoretically be used in conjunction with a flash drive to actually create cartridges for the older system, allowing the modified ROM images to run on the original hardware. A notable example of such a fan game is The Legend of Zelda: Parallel Worlds which was hailed by reviewers as a remarkable unofficial sequel to A Link to the Past. Other notable examples include Legend of Zelda: Curse from the Outskirts, Blaster Master: Pimp Your Ride, and Super Mario World - The Second Reality Project 2.

Famous fan mods (for example, Counter-Strike, Day of Defeat, and Pirates, Vikings and Knights II) may even be adopted by the game developer (in all the mentioned cases, Valve) and made into an official addition to the existing game (Half-Life).

=== Console releases ===
Because fan games are developed with a relatively low budget, a fan game is rarely available on a console system; licensing fees are too prohibitive. However, unlicensed fan games have occasionally made it onto consoles with a significant homebrew scene, such as the Atari 2600, the NES, SNES, the Game Boy line, Sony's PlayStation, PlayStation 2 and PlayStation Portable, and many others.

== Suppression and cease and desist ==
Some companies shut down fan games as copyright infringements. Original copyright holders can order a cease and desist upon fan game projects, as by definition fan games are unauthorized uses of copyrighted property. Many fan games go as far as taking music and graphics directly from the original games.

A notable case in late 2005 involved Vivendi Universal shutting down a King's Quest fan project, King's Quest IX: Every Cloak Has a Silver Lining. It was to be an unofficial sequel granting closure to the series, which had its last release in 1998. After a letter-writing campaign and fan protests, Vivendi reversed its decision and gave permission for the game to be made. As part of the negotiations, the developers were required to remove "King's Quest" from the title. Conversely, fan protests for the shutting down of Chrono Resurrection (a remake demo of Chrono Trigger) in 2004 have yielded no result on Square Enix's action to block the project.

Nintendo is notorious for its strict protection of its intellectual property (IP) and has shut down many notable fan games, including an HD remake of Super Mario 64, AM2R, and No Mario's Sky. Nintendo has also taken down various Pokémon fan games such as Pokenet and Pokémon Uranium.

A Spyro the Dragon fan game, Spyro: Myths Awaken, was shut down by Activision (the current owners of the Spyro IP) in September 2018, later replacing all Activision-owned content with original content and being renamed Zera: Myths Awaken. After this legal action, other fan-made games like Spyro 2: Spring Savanna stopped development. Previously in 2007, legal action was also taken by Activision against an open source software named Piano Hero by sending a cease and desist letter, which resulted in a name change to Synthesia.

In 2021, a lawsuit was filed by Rockstar Games' parent company Take-Two Interactive against the authors of re3 and reVC, which were reverse engineering projects for the games Grand Theft Auto III and Grand Theft Auto: Vice City that allowed the games to be played on contemporary platforms such as the Nintendo Switch. Take-Two asserted that they "are well aware that they do not possess the right to copy, adapt, or distribute derivative GTA source code, or the audiovisual elements of the games, and that doing so constitutes copyright infringement", and also alleging that the project has caused "irreparable harm" to the company. Take-Two dismissed the lawsuits in April 2023.

Also in 2021, Osmany Gomez developed a game titled I Am Batman using the Unreal Engine 5 engine, using the characters Batman, Joker, and Penguin from Tim Burton's Batman duology. In May 2021, the developer posted a video of a demo version of the game on his YouTube channel, but two days later Warner Bros. blocked his video. Gomez does not want to sue the film studio and therefore the project was closed.

Capcom suspended a fan's remake of Resident Evil – Code: Veronica and the original Resident Evil on copyright grounds.

In 2011, when the fandom community for the TV series My Little Pony: Friendship is Magic was growing rapidly, a group of fans got together to plan a fan fighting game inspired by games like Street Fighter, featuring characters from the show. The project, My Little Pony: Fighting is Magic, gained popularity and excitement, and was presented at several conventions. However, when Hasbro caught wind of this news, they sent a cease and desist and effectively prevented the game from coming to full fruition. The project ended up being noticed by a leading animator and character designer on the show, Lauren Faust, who liked the concept so much that she encouraged it to be made with a new cast of four-legged characters designed by her. The game was renamed to Them's Fightin' Herds and initially released in 2018.

== Endorsement and ambivalence ==
Other times, companies have endorsed fan games. For example, Capcom has featured Peter Sjöstrand's Mega Man 2.5D fan game in their community site more than once. However, Capcom Senior Vice President Christian Svennson has stated that, while they legally cannot sanction fan games, they will not proactively go after them either. In 2012, Capcom took Seo Zong Hui's Street Fighter X Mega Man and funded it, promoting it from a simple fan game to an officially licensed freeware Mega Man game.

In 2008, Christian Whitehead created his own game engine, known as the Retro Engine, for use in the Sonic the Hedgehog fan game Retro Sonic. Whitehead developed a proof-of-concept prototype of Sonic the Hedgehog CD running on the Retro Engine and pitched it to Sega. Sega gave their approval, and a full remake running on Whitehead's engine was released two years later. Whitehead later worked with fellow fan-programmer Simon Thomley to develop mobile remakes of Sonic the Hedgehog and Sonic the Hedgehog 2, and ultimately directed an all-new Sonic the Hedgehog title, Sonic Mania, with a development team made up of individuals noted for their work in the Sonic the Hedgehog fan community. Mania would also be used as the basis for Sonic Superstars.

In 2013, Valve Corporation granted the developers of Black Mesa, a formerly freeware fan remake of the 1998 Half-Life, permission to sell the game commercially on Steam in order to allow it to have higher production values. Following its 2020 full release, veteran Valve level designer Dario Casali called it "awesome" and better than the original game.

In 2017, Mig Perez and Jeffrey Montoya released Castlevania: The Lecarde Chronicles 2. The game features all new assets and a new soundtrack, as well as new voice acting from actors who appeared in the official Castlevania series, such as Douglas Rye who played Dracula in Curse of Darkness and Robert Belgrade who played Alucard in Symphony of the Night. Konami allowed the game to be released with the contingency that the game remains non-profit.

In 2020, Scott Cawthon announced his plan to help fund and publish Five Nights at Freddy's games developed by fans, bundled with previous installments in their respective series. Games published under this initiative include the One Night at Flumpty's series, the Five Nights at Candy's series, the Popgoes series, and The Joy of Creation. Cawthon stated that these games will come to other platforms, such as mobile and consoles, and may have merchandise created for them. The first game to be released under this initiative was a port of One Night at Flumpty's for Android and iOS on October 31 and November 18, 2020, respectively, followed by two of its sequels in 2021 on the same platforms.

The fan games Skywind and Skyblivion, remakes of The Elder Scrolls III: Morrowind (2002) and The Elder Scrolls IV: Oblivion (2006), respectively, in the game engine of The Elder Scrolls V: Skyrim, both received official approval from the games' developers, Bethesda Softworks. Despite releasing Oblivion Remastered in 2025, Bethesda went as far as to give the Skyblivion team free copies of the official remaster and praise them multiple times, with art and development lead Dan Lee calling the remake project "very special".

== See also ==
- Fan labor
- Homebrew (video games)
- Doujin soft
- Video game modding
- ROM hacking
- Video game development
- GameMaker
- Microsoft XNA
- Mugen (game engine)
- XGameStation series
- Enterbrain's game suites
  - RPG Maker
  - Fighter Maker
  - Sim RPG Maker
