= Keystone Kapers =

1983 video game

- Developer: Activision
- Publisher: Activision
- Designer: Garry Kitchen
- Platforms: Atari 2600, Atari 5200, Atari 8-bit, ColecoVision, MSX
- Release: May 1983: Atari 2600; May 1983; Colecovision; June 1984; Atari 5200; 1984
- Genre: Platform
- Mode: Single-player

Keystone Kapers is a platform game developed by Garry Kitchen for the Atari 2600 and published by Activision in 1983. The game involves a Keystone Cops theme, with the player controlling police officer Kelly, who traverses four floors of a department store, dodging objects to catch the escaped thief Harry Hooligan.

Kitchen designed the game after working on Atari 2600 games Space Jockey and a port of Donkey Kong. He wanted to develop a game similar to the latter game, and he began developing what would become Keystone Kapers. On the game's release in 1982, it received positive critical attention for its graphics and gameplay. It was later ported to other consoles such as the ColecoVision and Atari 5200.

== Gameplay ==
Officer Kelly on the lowest floor, with Harry Hooligan one floor above (Atari 2600)

Keystone Kapers is about police officer Keystone Kelly trying to capture the con-artist and thief Harry Hooligan who is at large in Southwick's Emporium. The game involves the player controlling Kelly, moving him left and right and having him jump and duck to avoid objects such as shopping carts, beach balls and toy biplanes. The player's goal is to apprehend Harry, who can be tracked on a mini-map at the bottom of the screen where Kelly is the black dot and Harry is the white dot. Kelly can maneuver himself between the floors of the building between elevators and the escalator.

The game ends when the player runs out of lives: lives are lost when running out of time, colliding with a biplane, or allowing Harry escape to the roof of the building. Points are rewarded when apprehending Harry, for the amount of time left when apprehending Harry, and collecting items left around the mansion such as moneybags and suitcases. Extra lives can be earned for every 10,000 points.

== Development ==
Keystone Kapers was the third Atari 2600 game developed by Garry Kitchen following his games Space Jockey and a port of Donkey Kong. Following completing work on Donkey Kong in May 1982, Kitchen joined Activision in June. Kitchen flew out to meet with the Activision team. Activision founder David Crane said that he knew the company had to grow but that having more people together would have made things worse so having the other office far away was ideal. Kitchen worked at Activision from a satellite design office in Glen Rock, New Jersey. Kitchen spoke of the situation later, saying the he found the other Crane's group "preferred the idea of spawning another creative office to minimise the chance of screwing up the group synergy of Activision’s original creative team." He immediately began designing a game which would become Keystone Kapers. The game was developed under the code name of Cop.

Kitchen described that after working on Donkey Kong, he was in "little man mode", a term he used to describe games where the player controls a small person on the screen. Kitchen believed that due to the limitations of the Atari 2600 hardware, he wanted to create a theme could be effectively rendered on the machine while still being lighthearted and whimsical. He experimented with different characters before deciding on a Keystone Kapers before settling on a game around the imagery of the Keystone Cops, as he could properly render their bowler caps, blue uniforms, and billy clubs as well as creating an effective crook graphic. In a 1983 interview, he stated that idea of the Keystone Cop-theme came from his wife.

At the time of development, Activision made games via a PDP-11 minicomputer for editing and writing code and assembling it for 6502-based machines. The initial gameplay design to Keystone Kops was similar to Donkey Kong, with the cop going through the stage vertically to catch up with the crook who was going through the building floor by floor. About a month into development, the vertically scrolling version of the game was in a presentable state. When Kitchen showed the game to David Crane, Crane suggested to make the game extend horizontally like his game Pitfall! that he was working on. Kitchen kept some elements of Donkey Kong in the game, such as objects being thrown at the crook to delay him in this pursuit. Other influences came from Bob Whitehead's Chopper Command, which featured a small map at the bottom of the screen that displayed to players where both the cop and the thief were located.

Keystone Kapers had a four kilobyte limitation for its ROM size. Kitchen stated the limit was necessary from a financial decision. Kitchen noted some items he wish he could have included, such as making it more obvious for the player when was the right to time to use the elevator or escalator in the game. Some elements of the game were removed during the development, such as a scene outside the department store with a vehicle resembling a Ford Model T parked at the curb. Kitchen recalled that the "car was beautiful, but I eventually had to remove it because it cost too many bytes." Other items removed included a television, which Kitchen removed as it was an anachronism. Kitchen said he "had to really cram to finish the game."

Keystone Kapers was later adapted for the ColecoVision by Mike Livesay. A version for the Atari 5200 adds musical backing and the ability to choose what level of the game to start at.

== Release ==
Activision announced the release Keystone Kapers in January 1983 with the game set to be shipped in April. The game was released for the Atari 2600 in May 1983. It was released for the ColecoVision in June 1984. Keystone Kapers was included in various Activision compilation game releases such as Activision Classics (1998) for the PlayStation and Activision Anthology (2002) for various systems.

Atari teased a large announcement on August 20, 2026 which was revealed a re-release of several Activision games for the Atari 2600. This included Kaboom!, which was set for a mid-2027 release.

== Reception ==
Reception

Review scores
| Publication | Score | |
| Publication | Atari 2600 | ColecoVision |
|---|---|---|
| AllGame | | 3/5 |
| Deseret News | | 3/4 |
| Electronic Fun with Computers and Games | 3.5/4 | |
| Micro & Video | 3/5 | |

From contemporary reviews of the Atari 2600 version, reviewers such as Perry Greenberg in Video Games and Jim Clarke of Videogaming & Computergaming Illustrated praised the games graphics. Clarke specifically described them as "brilliant", noting the swinging legs and arms of characters which were "an absolute delight, the best videogame character we've had since the Mad Bomber of Kaboom!." Critics had varied comments on the gameplay. While a review in Electronic Games said the game was "highly recommended", finding the game original, compulsively playable and was "truly vintage Activision, and that's saying something special." The Video Game Update found that early levels were easy, that later levels adding more obstacles adding strategic possibilities and depth, declaring the game "a thoroughly charming and whimsical game with great animation". Clarke commented on the gameplay being similar to that of Donkey Kong and Pitfall! and while it was a less innovative game than Activision's Dolphin (1983), it was infinitely more exciting. Michael Blanchet echoed the comparisons in his review in Electronic Fun with Computers and Games, saying it resembled Donkey Kong but offers enough graphic and strategic differences to be called an original game. Blanchet also praised the ability to capture the criminal, stating that "instead of fleeing to another structure, the crook surrenders when caught. Giving you that glorious, but short-lived feeling of victory." The reviewers in Micro & Video complimented the large variety of objects, the high quality sound and play control in the Atari 2600 release. The review only recommended the game to rent over owning it, stating that the game had the players memorize the dangers and knowing what will happen before it did leading the game to become dull quickly.

Along with BurgerTime and Dracula for Intellivision, the Atari 2600 version of Keystone Capers received the Certificate of Merit in the category "1984 Videogame of the Year (Less than 16K ROM)" at the 5th annual Arkie Awards. In December 1984, Antic reviewer Ellen Keyt called out the quality of the animation in the Atari 8-bit version, writing "The Keystone Cop's legs stretch when he jumps over a shopping cart, his uniform creases when he squats to duck a toy airplane, and he even pumps his hands up and down, waving his stick when he runs." She called it the "perfect game for anyone". Reviewing the Atari 5200 version, Computer Entertainer gave negative reviews to both the ColecoVision and Atari 5200 versions of the game. The reviewer said that "what was a good game for the Atari 2600 just isn't varied or exciting enough when compared to other games for the more advanced 5200." Deseret News gave the ColecoVision port a three star rating, praising the graphical improvement over the original.

=== Retrospective reviews ===
Brett Alan Weiss of AllGame found the game "solid, yet forgettable". Weiss compared it to similar games of the era such as Miner 2049er (1982) or The Heist (1983) and finding that Keystone Kapers lacked the depth or scope, as if it were the first level of Donkey Kong spread across multiple screens. Retro Gamer listed the game and 11th place in their list of "Top 25 Atari 2600 Games" in 2008 noting its graphics, gameplay depth and declaring it a platformer game that constantly manages to entertain.

== Legacy ==
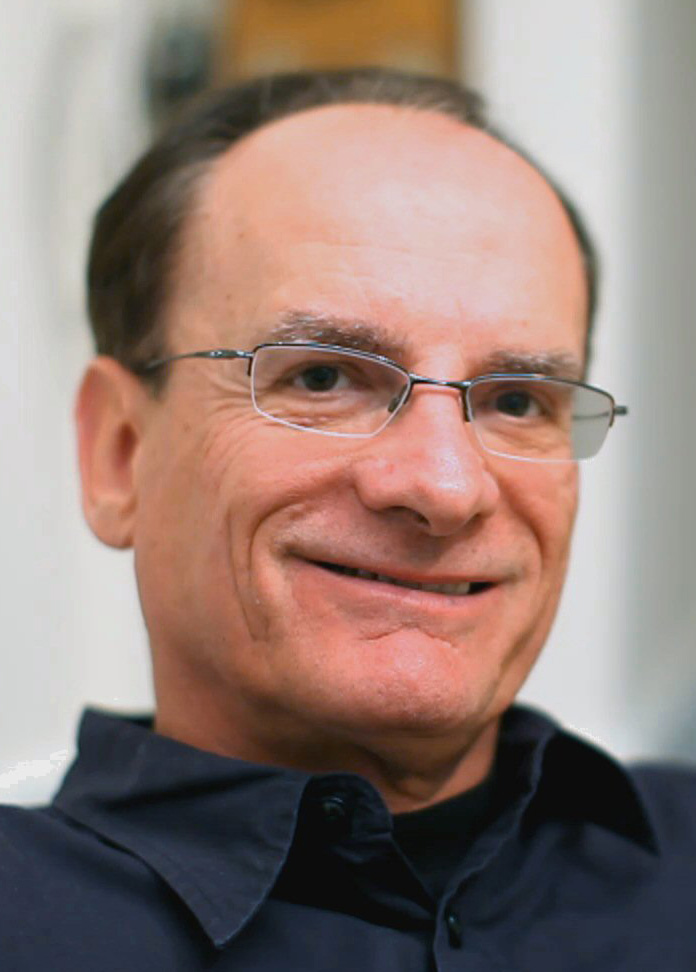
Garry Kitchen in 2013, 30 years after the release of Keystone Kapers

Garry's brother Dan Kitchen planned to follow-up his first Atari 2600 game Crackpots with a sequel to Keystone Kapers in a Western setting. In 2018, Dan found the only surviving copy of the unfinished game in a storage unit and planned to release it under the title Gold Rush. It was released as Casey's Gold by Audacity Games in November 2024.

Kitchen followed up Keystone Kapers with Pressure Cooker for Activision for the Atari 2600, and would continue do develop programs for home computers such as Garry Kitchen's GameMaker and consoles such as A Boy and His Blob: Trouble on Blobolonia (1989) for the Nintendo Entertainment System. Reflecting on the game, Garry Kitchen said that felt the game had aged well and "from a graphics standpoint, I certainly spent a lot of time on the look of the game, and I hope it paid off. Obviously, I also put in a great deal of effort tweaking the playability [...] I'm sure that, without that time and effort, the game would not have the staying power that it does."

== See also ==
- List of Atari 2600 games
- List of Activision games: 1980–1999
