= Arcade Game Construction Kit =

1988 game creation system

- Developer(s): Livesay Technologies
- Publisher(s): Broderbund
- Designer(s): Mike Livesay
- Platform(s): Commodore 64
- Release: 1988
- Genre(s): Game creation system

Arcade Game Construction Kit is a 1988 game creation system for making action video games. It was developed by Mike Livesay and published by Broderbund for the Commodore 64 on four floppy disks. The program uses a joystick-driven menu system and includes six pre-made games to learn from and play.

== Included games ==
- AGCK TUTORIAL GAME -- This is a simple variation on classic arcade shooters such as Galaxian.
- KANGARANG (designed by Gregory Hammond) -- The player is a kangaroo mother looking to rescue its baby and return to safety. Hazards include falling boulders, jumping fish, monkeys and natives.
- ISLE QUEST (designed by Greg Johnson and Paul Reiche III) -- The player is a brave explorer in search of new lands and riches. Hazards include pirate ships, hostile natives.
- MUSASHI (designed by Greg Johnson and Paul Reiche III) -- The player is an ancient samurai warrior looking to rescue his princess. The player must fight through a fortress, collecting gold, sushi, and the mighty Sword of the Samurai.
- GERG'S ADVENTURE (designed by Gregory Hammond) -- The player is Gerg, a tiny creature who wants to get back to his home. Gerg must pick up a variety of orbs to power up, and to clear each level.
- SPACE WORRIES (designed by Paul Reiche III and Greg Johnson) -- The player controls a space ship, looking to collect mysterious metallic cylinders to destroy an enemy that has taken control of your planet.

== See also ==
- The Arcade Machine
- Garry Kitchen's GameMaker
- Shoot'Em-Up Construction Kit
