= TooMunchFun =

American advergaming website

- Website type: Internet games
- Available in: English
- Founded: 2001; 25 years ago
- Dissolved: 2005
- Owner: Kraft Foods
- Creator: Kraft Foods
- Founder: Kraft Foods
- Commercial: Yes
- Registration: Optional
- Launched: 2001; 25 years ago
- Current status: Defunct

TooMunchFun was an American advergaming portal owned by Kraft Foods. It went into operation in 2001. Many of its games were tied in to at least one of its brands, including Post Cereals, which also had its own website. As of a June 2001 Nielsen survey, the website attracted an audience of 59,000 unique users ages 6–11

In the 2001 back-to-school season, Kraft held a series of sweepstakes on both the TooMunchFun and Nickelodeon websites. In 2002, it had a game coinciding with the 20th anniversary re-release of E.T., ET Adventures. For the 2002 back-to-school season, the website offered music-related content, to complement what other websites were doing with the Be a Popstar game. For the same season in 2003, it offered activities related to Kraft's Win A Sports Star For Your School campaign.

It is unknown what led to the closure of the website. In February 2005, TooMunchFun was replaced by a Kraft Brands landing page saying that the website was removed, with users having the choice of either Postopia or NabiscoWorld, its sister sites at the time.
