= Metagalaxy =

Metagalaxy is a term referring to a large-scale galactic system. It may refer to

- The whole Observable Universe
- A galactic group or cluster
- A group of clusters, such as a supercluster
- The entire system of galaxies making up the large-scale structure of the universe
- Multiple virtual worlds clustered together as perceived collectives under a single authority

This term is now little used. Historically, it was first referred to the entire observable Universe as an extension of something larger than a galaxy, i.e. the whole observable Universe.
