= Destination Earthstar =

1990 video game

- Cover art
- Developer(s): Imagineering
- Publisher(s): Acclaim
- Designer(s): Garry Kitchen; Rob Harris
- Composer(s): Mark Van Hecke
- Platform(s): Nintendo Entertainment System
- Release: NA: February 1990
- Genre(s): Shooter
- Mode(s): Single-player

Destination Earthstar is a futuristic, first-person and side-scrolling, space shooter game developed by Imagineering and published by Acclaim for the Nintendo Entertainment System.

== Plot ==
Two hundred years ago, a random number of Earthlings were captured for slave labor. They eventually earned their freedom and the privilege to live amongst the aliens as equals. The descendants of these enslaved Earthlings formed a group and sent a volunteer into outer space in the hopes of finding planet Earth again.

Players have to travel through eight vast planetary systems in order to get back to their original home world.

== Summary ==
The view of the game is from the cockpit of a spacecraft. The goal of the game is to explore a grid which is displayed on screen in search of opponents to destroy and to land on planets some of which refuel the energy and refill the ammunition of the player's arsenal of weapons. The player starts with two weapons. The primary weapon is the Ruby Laser, with a rapid zapping capability that has a tendency to overheat. Once overheated the lasers will stop firing, and the player must wait for the weapon to cool down to use it again. The secondary weapon are Neutron Torpedoes with three times the demolition force of the Ruby Laser, but supplies are limited. As the player travels through a star system they may be able to pick up two additional weapons. The Argon Blaster is a weapon that can be found featuring disintegrating acids. A Heat Seeker weapon can also be found that tracks enemy objects that have a special sighting mechanism, which is not available in other weapons. After the player has destroyed every enemy that is on the grid, a number will be indicated. This number represents how many enemies are in that quadrant of the grid. After blasting numerous enemies, the player will finally be able to go to the planet labeled "B" on the grid. These planets are unlike the other planets as they do not refill the player's vehicles energy or ammo.

Rather, they are an enemy base that proceeds with the player entering an 8-bit cutscene of his spacecraft entering the base's gravitational orbit with the gameplay changing from a first-person cockpit players had on the grid stage to a horizontal 2D shoot 'em up stage similar to Konami's Gradius or Irem's R-Type. Using this perspective, projectiles can be fired from the front or back of the player's ship.

== Reception ==
Allgame gave Destination Earthstar a rating of 2 stars out of a possible 5.
