= Arcade Hoops Basketball =

2009 video game

- Developer(s): Skyworks Interactive
- Publisher(s): Skyworks Interactive
- Designer(s): Garry Kitchen
- Platform(s): iOS, Nintendo DS (DSi via DSiWare)
- Release: NA: April 17, 2009 (iOS); NA: December 28, 2009 (DSiWare)
- Genre(s): Sports, arcade
- Mode(s): Single-player

Arcade Hoops Basketball (also called Arcade Hoops) is a basketball video game developed and published by Skyworks Interactive. It was released as a download-only title on April 17, 2009 for the iOS and on December 28, 2009 for the Nintendo DSi via the DSiWare service. This was the first game developed and published by Skyworks Interactive.

== Gameplay ==
The game is similar to the basketball minigames found in arcades and midways. In the game, players use the iPhone or Nintendo DSi device to attempt to score as many baskets as possible within 45 seconds. This involves players having to hold the basketball by touching it on the touchscreen and then shoot the ball by flicking toward the top of the touchscreen. The game involves three different modes of gameplay – shooting from short distance, from medium distance, or from the three-point line. The game has a feature in which the highest scores in each mode are saved. The game also gives players the option to either shoot at a stationary basket or at a basket that moves back and forth toward the player.

== Development ==
Arcade Hoops Basketball was developed by Garry Kitchen, who developed Donkey Kong for the Atari 2600 and Activision Gamemaker. According to an interview with Pocket Gamer Kitchen said that Arcade Hoops Basketball was intended to be more of "a web casual game rather than a console title". Kitchen worked on the game by himself and in his spare time as the other members of Skyworks were busy working on other games. The game took six weeks to write and complete.
