= Mega Man 2.5D =

Mega Man fan game

- Art of Mega Man 2.5D
- Director(s): Peter Sjöstrand
- Programmer(s): Edgar Cebolledo; Johan Sjöstrand; Ontikarus Ryan
- Composer(s): Magnus Palsson
- Series: Mega Man
- Platform(s): Windows
- Release: WW: January 31, 2017
- Genre(s): Platform
- Mode(s): Single-player; Multiplayer

Mega Man 2.5D is a fan-made platform game designed by Peter Sjöstrand and Edgar Cebolledo for PC based on the Mega Man series. It originally started as a fan animation that he made after being inspired by building Legos of characters from the Mario and Mega Man series and later creating the character Mega Man in Autodesk Maya. There are three game modes available: single-player, cooperative multiplayer, and competitive multiplayer, all of which are offline only, with levels in single-player being only playable solo and cooperative levels being only playable with two people. The game primarily takes content from Mega Man 2 and Mega Man 3, but content and characters from Mega Man 5 and Mega Man 9, among others, are also included.

The animation received positive reception, praised as being an exciting take on the Mega Man series with hopes that it might become an actual game in the future. The game itself received positive reception, particularly for its authenticity and unique ideas such as the 3D camera and co-op gameplay.

== Gameplay ==
Gameplay from Mega Man 2.5D showing off the 2.5D gimmick

Mega Man 2.5D has players take control of Mega Man series protagonist Mega Man in a 2D side-scrolling environment, with a 3D camera perspective changing at points during the level. The game features mechanics found in the Mega Man series, including jumping, shooting, and the ability to get power-ups from defeating bosses called Robot Masters. Each stage has obstacles built around the stage theme that Mega Man has to overcome.

In the single-player mode, players control Mega Man as he navigates through levels, transitioning from 2D to 3D via camera perspective changes. Mega Man 2.5D has a local cooperative mode where one player controls Mega Man and the other controls Proto Man.

== Development ==
=== Animation ===
Mega Man 2.5D originally started as an animation using 3D modeling software designed by Peter Sjöstrand in 2009, which eventually was posted to YouTube as a proof-of-concept. He was inspired to make the concept while shopping at a mall and, while there, waiting for his friend to finish shopping by using Legos to make characters from the Mario and Mega Man series. This led to him using Autodesk Maya to create 3D models using cubes, creating a sprite of Mega Man. He eventually made more objects, and eventually created the animation.

=== Video game ===
Once the video was uploaded, the video's popularity lead Sjöstrand to begin talking to some programmers to discuss turning it into a video game. For a large portion of the game's development, the work was done by Sjöstrand and lead programmer Edgar Cebolledo. Later, two more people joined the protect, Johan Sjöstrand and Ontikarus Ryan, who assisted in multiple areas, including game testing and programming. Before release, the game was designed by no more than six people.

When designing the levels, the team has a rough sketch of the level made and expands upon it from there. As they do more work on the stage, they sometimes had to go back and tweak things once they saw them in action. For Sjöstrand, one of the most difficult parts of developing Mega Man 2.5D was making sure it felt authentically like a Mega Man game in terms of physics. When looking for inspiration, Sjöstrand played through the Game Boy Mega Man games, while Cebolledo watched streams of NES games and played newer games. One series that they took inspiration from when designing a level was the Mario series.

When working on the co-op mode, it was planned that levels could be played in either single-player or cooperatively. However, Sjöstrand found that the changing camera only worked in single-player, and content designed with co-op play in mind could be impossible alone. Sjöstrand did not want to compromise by making levels that work in both modes, and thus decided to have separate stages for single-player and co-op. The team made a point of trying to include co-op mechanics that would both be simple and fitting in a classic Mega Man game.

Robot Masters from various Mega Man games were included in Mega Man 2.5D, and the designers chose which Robot Master to include based on whether they felt they could expand upon their stage. They offered Snake Man from Mega Man 3 as an example, where they added enemies from Battletoads. They also Splash Woman from Mega Man 9, where they added water elements from Mega Man 2 and Mega Man 5. They chose to include Splash Woman because they felt it was a more interesting choice than Bubble Man from Mega Man 2, but kept level elements from Mega Man 2 and Mega Man 5 in order to make Splash Woman's level more varied. Quick Man from Mega Man 2 was added based on his recognition, as well as his weapon and stage. Quick Man was particularly difficult to implement properly, as when they sought information about his movement patterns, they found that he has so many as to be seemingly random. Instead, they had to play Mega Man 2 in order to get a feel for his patterns.

Mega Man 2.5D was composed by Magnus Palsson, and the soundtrack was composed with the intention of evoking Mega Man 2 and Mega Man 3. When composing the music, Palsson made a point of trying to mimic the series' music in terms of conveyance of emotion and story. He stated that he wanted to evoke the familiar Mega Man music while also doing something new. Some songs on the soundtrack are covers, while others are "something that sounds like [Palsson]."

== Release ==
A demo of the game was released in 2013, only including a multiplayer version of the Shadow Man stage from Mega Man 3. Following the demo's release, Sjöstrand polled fans to determine which levels to feature from the Mega Man series. An additional single-player beta was announced for a future update. This beta update was released in 2014. An update was later added in 2015 to add a versus mode. Mega Man 2.5D was released on January 31, 2017, eight years after it began development.

There was some speculation as to whether Mega Man 2.5D would be allowed to be kept up by Capcom, the owner of the Mega Man license.

== Reception ==
The initial animation received generally positive reception. Writer Griffin McElroy expressed disappointment that the video was likely an animation and not actual gameplay due to the creator's history as an animator rather than a developer. Destructoid writer Chad Concelmo praised the video, calling it "incredible" and saying that it "needs to be seen to be believed." Nintendo Life writer Darren Calvert was particularly excited for the idea of simultaneous two-player co-op gameplay, and hoped to see it become an actual game.

Digital Trends writer Phil Hornshaw praised it for capturing the feeling of a classic Mega Man game, calling it a "loving fan remix." He also praised the game's co-op mode for feeling fresh, though noted that setting up a controller can be more complicated than normal. Nintendo Life writer Thomas Whitehead begrudged that Capcom had not made any games for Mega Man's 25th anniversary, appreciating that Mega Man 2.5D at least released in this year. Geek.com writer Tony Polanco felt that the 3D effect was odd at first, but that it "all works beautifully." He also appreciated the presence of a cooperative mode.

== See also ==
- Mega Man Maker - Another Mega Man fan game
