= Postopia =

American advergaming website

- Website type: Internet games
- Available in: English
- Founded: 2001; 25 years ago
- Dissolved: January 2011; 15 years ago
- Owner: Post Consumer Brands
- Creators: Post Consumer Brands, Skyworks Technologies
- Founder: Post Consumer Brands
- Commercial: Yes
- Registration: Optional
- Launched: February 2001; 25 years ago
- Current status: Defunct

Postopia was an American advergaming portal that was run by Skyworks Technologies in partnership with Post Cereals from 2001 to 2011.

== History ==
Work on the website started at Skyworks in 1999 and continued until 2009. The site opened in 2001; its games featured tie-ins with cereal mascots and characters. As of a June 2001 Nielsen survey, the website attracted 260,000 unique users aged under 12.

The first version was developed by Scient. It was advertised on television and was featured in more than 17 million Post cereal boxes. The initial version was divided into four countries, each one with its own main character: Futuria, a futuristic city inhabited by inventors known as the Gadgetrons, led by Zander; the Ice Burbs, a wintry location dedicated to fashion and trends, its inhabitants being the Ice Breakers, led by Kiki; Space Nation, a space station located above Postopia and populated by a team of explorers known as the Galaxy Busters, led by Chelsea; and the underwater Wet World, inhabited by professional athletes known as the Water Loggers, led by Nick. In 2004, the site was made by Razorfish, with two million unique users visiting per month for up to 30 minutes a day each. Development was largely due to the implementation of broadband connections, a technological advancement pivotal for the development of interactive websites.

In November 2005, Skyworks started delivering USB-ported Dance Dance Revolution-inspired dancing mats. These mats were available from sister website NabiscoWorld. That same year, it was heavily targeted by a new Kraft policy to promote only healthier foods, which effected the website by the end of 2006. In 2006, Congress went after advergames for sponsoring unhealthy foods, prompting them to detach from their previous sponsors. The website attracted a million child users in the second quarter of 2006. In December 2007, Postopia received the most traffic from outside advertising on Nickelodeon's website (87%), Disney's website (74%), and RuneScape (67%). As of 2009, the average number of visitors per month had fallen to 264,000.

A 2011 study said that only a limited number of kids were aware that the games were made to advertise cereals—the study targeted the Honey-Comb-sponsored Be a Popstar. At the bottom of its homepage, it included a fine-print message explaining that the website contained commercial advertising related to its products. It also featured Postokens, with which users unlocked new levels or features to existing games using passwords found in cereal boxes.

The website was discontinued in 2011, likely as an effect of the reduction in child-based advertising online. Another cause was Kraft's sale of Post to Ralcorp, which hampered the creation of a new website. The website was replaced by PebblesPlay.com, an advergame website promoting Fruity and Cocoa Pebbles, Unlike what happened with Postopia, PebblesPlay did not generate the same amount of impressions.
