= Fancade =

Arcade style game engine available in mobile and PC that was released in 2020

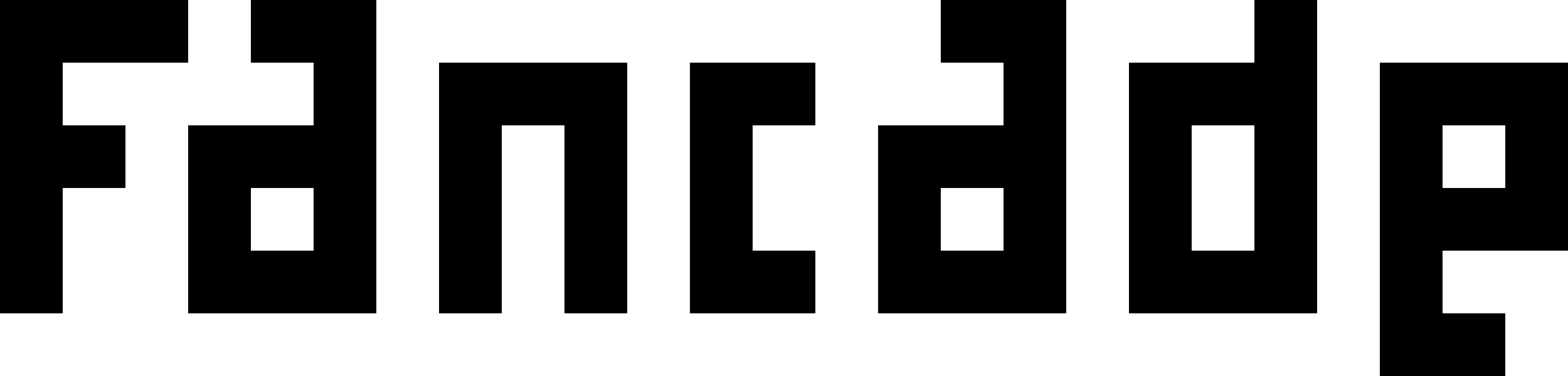
- Official logo of Fancade
- Developer: Fancade AB (owned by Martin Magni AB)
- Publisher: Martin Magni AB
- Designer: Martin Magni
- Series: Fancade series
- Platforms: iOS, Android, Web
- Release: April 29, 2020
- Genres: Puzzle, Action, Platformer, Sandbox
- Modes: Single-player, Multiplayer

Fancade is a 2020 mobile video game and game engine stylized in arcade games that enables users to create games using an intuitive visual scripting system. It was developed by Swedish developer Martin Magni, best known for Mekorama, and released on April 29, 2020. Early development under an early access period started in 2017. Over time, the project has expanded with contributions from other developers and is now headquartered in Linköping, Sweden.

Fancade combines gameplay and game creation in one platform, offering user-generated games across various genres, including puzzles, action, racing, platformers, and sandbox games. It is available on iOS, Android, and web browsers, providing cross-platform support for both creators and players.

As of 2026, the iOS version of Fancade is distributed on the App Store Store by Poki B.V., while the Google Play version is distributed by WebVentures B.V.

== Gameplay ==
Fancade offers a wide array of gaming experiences through its diverse game modes, including:

- Quest: A single-player mode where players progress through a series of community-created games and challenges. Stars are unlocked once games are cleared, which in turn can be used to unlock new worlds with new games. Some of the most famous games include Drive Mad, Longcat, and Odd Bot Out. Quest has at least 50 unique games with 1,000 levels comprising them.
- Battle: A pseudo-multiplayer mode where players compete to beat other user's high-scores on premade games that you would unlock via Arenas.
- Arcade: A mode featuring a curated collection of popular and trending mini-games created by the community, whilst having an recent tab, an top game list, an featured game list that would alert you on featured games if you had notifications on, and search games or authors by name or genre, and allows you to influence new games on rules. This tab also has an daily challenge on games that are featured on the top, and these challenges can bring bonuses on gems, the game's currency.
- Build: The in-app game creation system, Fanscript, which allows users to design and share their own games, curate other remixable games and collect on gem payouts, and use Kits for their needs.
- You: A personalized mode where players can view their account, friends and followers, get daily rewards on gems, see other user's activity, and turn off music or sound.

The platform's accessible editor and vast scripting tools enable users to design games without prior programming knowledge.

== Companies ==
Fancade
- Type: Private limited company
- Industry: Video games
- Founded: March 6, 2024; 2 years ago
- Founder: Martin Magni
- Headquarters: Linköping, Sweden
- Area served: Worldwide
- Key people: Martin Magni (Developer); Tomas Ahlström (CEO); Max Petrov (Board member of Fancade AB)
- Owner: SoftBank Group Corp. (20%) (2025–present); Martin Magni AB (20%) (2024–present)
- Parent: Martin Magni AB (2024–present)
- Website: www.fancade.com

Fancade AB is a Swedish video game company founded in 2024.

=== Origin ===
Fancade began as a game project created by Swedish developer Martin Magni, known for earlier titles like Mekorama. Fancade's early development started around 2017, with a public release in April 2020 on iOS, Android, and web platforms.

=== Ownerships ===
Acquired by Martin Magni AB since 2024 20% stakes, Fancade Group AB since 2024 26% stakes, and SoftBank Group Corp. since 2025 20% stakes.

== Reception ==
Fancade has been widely praised for its innovative design and accessibility. It won the Google Play Best of 2020 award in the category of Best Innovative. The game was also featured as a Game of the Day on the App Store, highlighting its high-quality design and broad appeal.

Critics have commended Fancade for its creative potential and engaging gameplay. Games Finder awarded it an 8.5 out of 10, describing it as "a free-to-play mixture of puzzles and mini-games" with "fantastic tools to create, share, and explore community-made creations".

TouchArcade called it "an ambitious project" and praised its unique approach to game creation and sharing. Similarly, Edamame Reviews described it as "the only mobile game you'll need in 2020," emphasizing the standalone quality of its mini-games.

Macworld described the game as "gaming for the short attention span generation" and "the App Store reimagined as WarioWare". In Android Central's "Android Game of the Week" series, Fancade was described as "an ambitious project that is both a growing collection of simple and fun casual games and also a visual scripting platform that enables anyone to design and publish their own homemade games".

== Official Wiki ==
The game's official wiki allows you to know specific knowledge about a script, feature, author, or game that is listed properly.
