= Cat Bird =

2017 video game

- App icon
- Developer: Raiyumi
- Publisher: Raiyumi
- Composer: Julien Mier
- Engine: Stencyl
- Platforms: Android; iOS
- Release: 23 August 2017
- Genre: Platformer
- Mode: Single-player

Cat Bird (sometimes stylised as Cat Bird!) is a 2017 mobile puzzle-platformer game developed and published by Ryan Carag, under the pseudonym Raiyumi, for Android and iOS. The game revolves around the titular character, a cross between a cat and a bird, who tries to get back to its home planet by travelling through portals at the end of each level. Cat Bird's main gimmick is that the player character can glide upon jumping, which can be used to overcome obstacles within the levels. Instead of giving the player a limited number of lives, the game instead just counts the number of deaths the player accumulated throughout the game.

Cat Bird was developed over the course of four months and changed mechanic ideas from a rechargeable jump to the gliding mechanic for an easier time in designing levels. The game was released on 23 August 2017, with additional content released subsequently. Cat Bird received positive reviews, with critics praising the level design, music, and art style, and criticising the onscreen button layouts. The game was downloaded over five million times.

== Gameplay ==
Cat Bird gliding over gaps to land on platforms while dodging obstacles such as spikes and sawblades.

Cat Bird is a two-dimensional (2D) puzzle-platformer game set in outer space with a pixelated art-style. The player character is a half-cat, half-bird hybrid named Cat Bird. In the game's opening scene, Cat Bird is launched away from its home planet during a meteor shower and must return home. Buttons to control the player character are positioned on the lower-half of the phone screen. The core gameplay of Cat Bird consists of the player character's ability to glide by holding down the jump command. The gliding mechanic is used to avoid hazards and obstacles, such as spikes, saw blades, falling rocks, and enemies, as well as to solve puzzles. The game consists of 45 levels split across three planets, fifteen levels per planet, with a boss fight at the end of each planet. Some levels hide a crown collectable for the player to find. After an update in October 2017, a fourth planet was added to the game, which is accessible to the player at any time. Two levels on the planet require crowns to unlock, which, upon completion, grant the player skins for Cat Bird.

The player is granted an unlimited number of lives; however, obstacles can only hit Cat Bird once before it dies. The lives counter is replaced by a counter that tracks the number of deaths accumulated throughout a playthrough. Outside of the game's main campaign, there is a Time Trials mode where the player replays all levels of a selected planet while being timed against a clock.

== Development and release ==
Cat Bird was developed by Ryan Carag (Rayumi), the founder of indie mobile game developer Raiyumi Inc, who used the Stencyl game engine. Julien Mier composed the music for Cat Bird. Cat Bird was Carag's first release, and according to him, it took four months to develop. In an interview with the website Indie Zoom, Carag mentioned that during the early stages of development, the initial game mechanic was that the player character would need to recharge its jump. However, Carag opted to switch out the mechanic due to his difficulty with designing fun levels around it. Upon implementing the gliding mechanic, level design became easier for him. Citing level design as the hardest aspect of the development process, Carag mentioned that he would "create a rough of each level, test, and work on the next level" before later on adding detail to the levels.

A trailer was released in early August 2017, and was scheduled to release on 24 August; it launched on 23 August, releasing for Android and iOS-supported devices. Since its release, Cat Bird has achieved over five million downloads on the Google Play Store. On 26 October, the game was updated to implement a new world, featuring new levels and a new boss. Two levels require collecting a set number of crowns from other levels to unlock; when an unlockable level is completed, the player is rewarded with a skin for the character. This update also featured new achievements as well as a leaderboard.

== Reception ==
Reception

Review scores
Publication	Score
Gamezebo	80/100
Pocket Gamer	4/5
AppAdvice	8.8/10

Cat Bird received positive reviews from critics, with websites such as Pocket Gamer and Game Rant citing it as one of the best games on mobile. TouchArcade listed the game in its "Best iPhone Games of 2017" list.

The game was praised for its pixelated art style. Some critics compared the environmental detail to other video games such as Fez and Cave Story, with Pocket Gamer's Chris James stating that the game's art style rivals that of Fez, feeling that each world had variety. In his review for TouchArcade, Jared Nelson commented on how the environments in the game were detailed and "full of life" due to the creatures in the level backgrounds. Nelson added that, compared to other "pixel art 'throwback' platformers", he felt that whilst not doing anything new the game's controls and level design were really well designed and realised. AppAdvice's Christine Chan described the game's aesthetics as nostalgic, further commenting the game used a palette of both "soft and muted earth tones" and vibrant colors.

Similarly, the music of Cat Bird was praised. In his review, James described how the soundtrack made him want to wear headphones to immerse himself into the atmosphere. Chan mentioned how the music added to the game's overall charm, adding that she described the sound effects as "quirky".

Some reviewers highlighted the level design. CJ Andriessen of Destructoid mentioned how the level design in Cat Bird is what sets the game apart from others like it, adding that he felt Carag had what made the titular character unique and, as a result, was able to design the levels to test the capabilities of the character. TouchArcade also praised the level design, mentioning that the puzzle platforming is well-designed and often used to demonstrate the gliding mechanic.

The controls of the game had a mixed reception. James felt that the controls were reliable for handling the traps and enemies each level had to offer, likening the traps in the levels to those seen in Super Meat Boy. He added that any death gained during his playthrough, he felt was his fault rather than the fault of the game. Likewise, in the TouchArcade review, the controls were praised, with Nelson mentioning that the simple moveset coupled well with the game's level design and progression instead of introducing a more complex moveset to the player. Gamezebo's Jennifer Allen stated that the game "nailed" the control system, mentioning how the player was inclined to glide. However, Allen also detailed an issue with the onscreen button controls, where the gliding would suddenly stop along with the character. Similarly, Chan criticised the button controls, stating that she felt that the positioning of the buttons was "a tad annoying" and recalled times where the player character would move in the opposite direction compared to Chan's input.

Many critics touched upon the design of the character Cat Bird, with Pocket Gamer and TouchArcade stating that the character looked more like a bat rather than a hybrid animal; Jared Nelson thought that it was part of a joke, but found the character cute in a "slightly creepy kind of way". James joked about how the game should have been called Cat Bat instead. Gamezebo's Allen commented that Cat Bird was rather "odd looking" and "bizarre", while Destructoid's Andriessen called the character a "cuddly abomination."
