= RPG Maker 3 =

- Developers: Runtime, Inc.
- Publishers: JP: Enterbrain; NA: Agetec
- Series: RPG Maker
- Platforms: PlayStation 2 PlayStation 3 (HD)
- Release: JP: December 16, 2004; NA: September 20, 2005
- Genre: Role-playing
- Mode: Single-player

RPG Maker 3 (RPGツクール; RPG Tsukūru, without a number) is the fourth PlayStation version of the RPG Maker series. It is the second game in the series released on the PlayStation 2. The game was also released on the PlayStation 3 in April 2013 through the PlayStation Network.

== Features ==
RPG Maker 3 features an advanced trigger system, different layouts for areas, and a variety of other features that requires extensive time to learn. 'Event' commands return, with several upgrades, such as 'conditional' events.

=== Graphics ===
The graphics in RPG Maker 3 are fully 3D. There are more than 20 character models, 50 enemy models, and several different terrain types. The program also contains a set of choices for all buildings and a large set of layouts for towns and dungeons. Because the program uses a 'database' structure to store data, users are limited to a certain number of placeable objects in an area.

=== Events ===
RPG Maker 3 uses an advanced trigger system to activate events through the game. Users select the unit, building, or object they wish to place a trigger to and enter the event editor. In the event editor, objects are set up so that when the player touchesmop it any number of effects can be triggered; item or treasure gains, boss battles, location changes, etc. Up to 50 events can be chained on objects allowing cinematic routines. The event creation process is also much simpler than its predecessor, where the players can create the script to the event while they are creating and placing the event, where as in RPG Maker 2, they had to create the script, assign it to an event, then place the event.

=== Music ===
RPG Maker 3 features a music system containing around 40-50 premade pieces of music. There are 8 game themes, several nature sounds, many tracks, and several different battle musics. These pieces were later remastered and released as in the RPG Maker 3 Music Pack add-on for the PC based RPG Maker engines. It can be purchased at the English RPG Maker website.

== Items ==
RPG Maker 3 classifies its items into four main categories: Items, Treasures, Weapons, and Armor.

- Items are usable items. Their effects range from healing to increasing stats to damaging the enemy. There is a variety of premade items such as potions and other amenities common to RPGs.
- Treasures are items used to open doors, trigger events, keys, and progress in the storyline. Common usage of treasures are when a boss is defeated, when a character joins the party, or when a major event occurs.
- Weapons are items used to be equipped by characters. When designing weapons, users select the attack bonus, the graphics for the weapon, and which characters can wield it.
- Armors are the other type of equipped item. These items increase defense and magic defense, and sometimes give other useful bonuses. Like weapons, users choose a graphic, extent of effect, and who can wield it.

== World design ==
The RPG Maker 3 world consists of three types of areas. Field Maps (the 'overworld' map common to many RPGs), Town Maps (where players purchase equipment and talk with NPCs), and Dungeon Maps (for fighting monsters and solving quests). Each is used for specific purposes and holds its own unique features.

- Field Maps are the 'overworld' of an RPG. On the field maps, monster parties can be designed to attack the player's character. Different monsters can be set to appear on different terrain type. Entry points for towns and dungeons are placed here as well.
- Town Maps are the main area where events take place. People, stores and launch pads can be placed in a town map. Launch pads allow the player to be teleported to other towns or dungeons for a set fee.
- Dungeon Maps are where boss battles and secret items are usually placed. Dungeons are designed on a twenty-floor system, with the tenth floor being the highest and floor B10 being the lowest. Within each floor, the designer can place traps, treasure chests, stairways, secret passages, and one secret door to take the player to another part of the world.
