= Role-playing game creation software =

Video game creation software

Role-playing game creation software is a game creation system (software program) intended to make it easy for non-programmers to create a role-playing video game. The target audience for most of these products is artists and creative types who have the imaginative abilities to assemble the elements of a game (artwork, plotline, music, etc.) but lack the technical skill to program it themselves.

== List ==
Name	License	Publisher	Initial release	Linux	Mac	Windows	Mobile	Description
001 Game Creator	Proprietary	SoftWeir Inc.	2006	No	No	Yes	Yes	A commercial action/RPG maker, it uses a subscription model.
Adventure Construction Set	?	Electronic Arts	1984	?	Apple II	MS-DOS	?	An early RPG maker for creating top-down view tile-based role-playing and adventure games. Published for the Commodore 64 and later ported to other 8-bit and early 16-bit microcomputers.
Adventure Creator	?	?	?	?	?	?	?	An early RPG maker for Apple II computers that allowed users to build very simple games. Not to be confused with Graphic Adventure Creator, a simplified version of which was also released as Adventure Creator.
Bard's Tale Construction Set	?	Electronic Arts	1991	?	?	MS-DOS	?	A (relatively) early RPG maker by Interplay, based on the basic design (first-person view and tile set) of the Bard's Tale games, using a version of the Thief of Fate game engine.
BYOND	?	BYOND Software	1996	Server only	No	Yes	No	Used for NEStalgia, and others.
DCGAMES	Proprietary	DC Software	1990	No	No	MS-DOS	No	An Ultima-style RPG game creation system.
EasyRPG	Free	EasyRPG community	2013	Yes	Player	Yes	Player	A cross-platform, open source RPG development tool and client, compatible with RPG Maker.
Forgotten Realms: Unlimited Adventures	Proprietary	Strategic Simulations, Inc.	1993	?	Mac OS	MS-DOS	?	A commercial game builder by MicroMagic using SSI's "Gold Box" engine.
KAGE	Free	?	?	Yes	No	Yes	No	A free software game development toolkit able to make RPGs utilizing KonsolScript.
Lugdunon	Proprietary	Cinera LLC	?	Yes	Yes	Yes	Yes	A 2D online RPG creator platform.
Maker3D	?	?	?	Yes	?	Yes	?	A 3D RPG creator in manga style.
Mire Engine	Proprietary	Making Italia	?	Yes	Yes	Yes	Yes	A 2D cross platform game engine using WebGL, DirectX and HTML5.
OHRRPGCE	GNU GPL	OHRRPGCE community	1997–1998	Yes	OS X	Yes	Android	An open source RPG maker.
RPG Creator	Proprietary	?	?	Yes	Yes	Yes	Yes	A commercial game development toolkit which runs through HTML5.
RPG Maker	?	?	?	?	?	?	?	A commercial Japanese software series that has been released since 1988 for many systems ranging from the PC-8801, MSX, PC-9801, and Microsoft Windows, to the Super Famicom, PlayStation, Game Boy Color, PlayStation 2, and cellphones.
RPG Playground	Proprietary	?	2012	Yes	Yes	Yes	Yes	A free, web based RPG maker to make, share and play RPGs.
RpgBoss	Free	?	?	?	?	?	?	A cross-platform open source editor and engine based on JavaScript and Scala.
Solarus	Free	?	2002	Yes	Yes	Yes	No	Open source RPG engine with a custom quest editor.
Sphere RPG Engine	Free	?	2000	Yes	Yes	Yes	No	A set of open source RPG makers utilizing JavaScript.
Verge	BSD		1997	?	Yes	Yes	PSP	An open source 2D game engine with an emphasis on role playing games.
Wolf RPG Editor	Free	SmokingWOLF	2008	?	?	?	?	A Japanese RPG creation tool. A "Pro" version with additional functions is sold separately.

While not an RPG maker per se, the Worldforge game engine is intended for creating MMORPGs.
