= Sim RPG Maker =

Tactical role-playing game maker

Sim RPG Maker 95
- Original author(s): Yoji Ojima
- Developer(s): ASCII; Pegasus Japan
- Initial release: May 29, 1998
- Stable release: Sim RPG Maker 95 VALUE! (1.10) / November 21, 2001
- Platform: Microsoft Windows, Sega Saturn, PlayStation, Steam
- Available in: Japanese
- Type: Game creation software

Sim RPG Maker (シミューレーションRPGツクール, Shimyūrēshon RPG Tsukūru) is a series of tactical role-playing game engine and spin-off of the long-running RPG Maker series, although the name is not a direct translation of the original name which would be "Simulation RPG Maker".

== Releases ==
There have been two versions of Sim RPG Maker in 1998. A Windows version was released on May 29, in Japan only. A console version was released on September 17, for the Sega Saturn and Sony PlayStation in Japan only by ASCII.

== Gameplay ==
Simulation RPG Maker 95 was released a year after RPG Maker 95 and allowed the user to create tactical games similar to the Fire Emblem series. While Sim RPG Maker 95 retained the user friendly layout and design of RPG Maker 95 it required a basic understanding of the program to properly use.

This style of game is classified as a tactical RPG similar to Final Fantasy Tactics, Fire Emblem, and Ogre Battle.

The program is somewhat limited and inflexible in comparison to other RPG Makers. It comes with a run-time package (RTP) with built-in graphics for animations. Custom graphics can be added, but this is more difficult than in other programs from the RPG Maker series. Graphics are limited to 256 colors, which can cause distortion if two graphics with differing pallets are used on the same map. Files must follow a strict naming convention using letters to designate the type of file, followed by numbers to differentiate the file. For example, a walking graphic for a character class using picture ID 007, could be named CA03_007. The first two letters, "CA", correspond to "character animation". The first set of numerical digits correspond to the animation slot used in the animation editor, slot 03. The final set of numerical digits correspond to the picture ID being used, 007. One advantage Sim RPG Maker has over others in the series is that it does not require the installation of the RTP to run a game created by the program. Only the installation of the game is necessary, but the graphics can only come in BMP file format, creating larger file sizes than the other RPG Maker programs.

A game typically involves several maps, each with a starting event or cutscene, the main battle, and an ending cutscene. In between maps, players can be sent to the camp, where they may purchase items, switch out party members, change equipment, or check stats of characters. Maps can be designed with different objectives in mind. The most common objective is defeating all enemies or a specific boss character. In addition, players may have to survive a set number of rounds, move past a specified location, or prevent specified characters from dying. Some maps may even be used strictly for cutscenes, with no battles taking place. Maps are progressed through linearly, but it is possible to send the player to maps out of order, enabling multiple/alternate storyline forks. It is also possible to send the player to a previous map.
