= Official Hamster Republic Role Playing Game Construction Engine =

Game engine

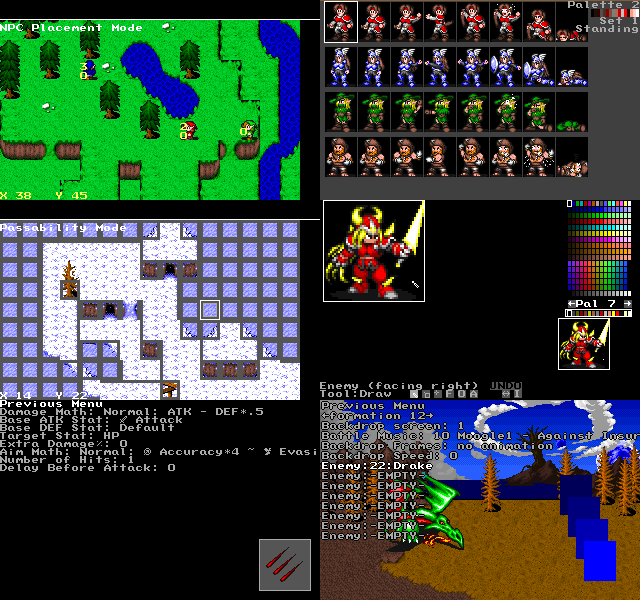
- Several screenshots from Custom.exe, the editor.
- Original author: James Paige
- Developer: OHRRPGCE Developers
- Initial release: 1997; 29 years ago
- Stable release: kaleidophone+1 / 10 August 2025; 9 months ago
- Written in: FreeBasic, C, C++
- Operating system: Linux, Mac OS, Microsoft Windows, Android, FreeBSD, Classic Mac OS
- Platform: x86, x86-64, ARM, PowerPC
- Available in: English
- Type: Game creation system
- License: GPL-2.0-or-later
- Website: rpg.hamsterrepublic.com/ohrrpgce/Main_Page

The Official Hamster Republic Role Playing Game Construction Engine (abbreviated as OHRRPGCE and OHR) is a free and open-source, "all-in-one" game creation system. It was designed to allow the quick creation of 2D role-playing video games (RPGs). It was originally written by James Paige in QuickBASIC and released in 1997. In May 2005, the source code was released as free software under the GNU GPL-2.0-or-later, and it was soon ported from QuickBASIC to FreeBASIC and to modern operating systems.

The OHRRPGCE is designed to be simple to use and to create full Final Fantasy-style RPGs without any programming required. HamsterSpeak, the custom scripting language used by the OHR, is very simple and is intended for users with no prior programming knowledge. As it is specialized with many hundreds of available commands, it provides flexibility although it does not attempt to be a general-purpose language. HUDs, battle systems, special effects, customized menus, and entirely scripted non-RPG games can be created with it.

It is often compared with more complex and more full-featured game engines like the commercial RPGMaker but it is open-source free software.

== Description ==
Most of the OHRRPGCE's games are amateur and made by novice game developers. However, other games are full-length RPGs, some of which have been released commercially. Sidescrollers, puzzle games, arcade remakes and first-person dungeon crawlers have all been made with the engine. The game editor (commonly called 'Custom'), which includes graphics, map and numerous other editors, is fully keyboard-based, though also supports using a mouse for most tasks. The game editor can be used on any supported platform except for Android.

=== Limitations ===
One of the biggest drawbacks of the engine are its strict technical limitations. It runs at an 8-bit color depth, by default creates games that run at a 320 × 200 resolution, and its editor prefers keyboard controls instead of using a modern graphical user interface toolkit. These are hold-overs from the original Mode X graphics mode used under MS-DOS. Many other restraints are due to the engine originally being written in QuickBasic, which had severe Real mode memory limitations. There are plans for removing most limitations, which the developers have been implementing gradually since the FreeBASIC port.

=== Mascot ===
The engine's mascot is Bob the Hamster, the protagonist of the game for which the engine was originally built for, Wandering Hamster.

== History ==
The OHRRPGCE was created by James Paige as a generic engine for personal use, starting in mid 1996 and building on previous free and commercial games created by Paige and Brian Fisher and released under the Hamster Republic name. The engine was created alongside its first game, Wandering Hamster, demos of which were released in late 1997, and which is still in active development as of 2020. Initially he decided to release the engine as shareware, offering only a crippled "4-Map" version to the public. Many people wanted the full engine, and James gave it to anybody who could mail him what he deemed a "Good game". After a few months of this, he released the full engine as freeware.

The November 9, 1999 release of the OHR was the first version to include the HamsterSpeak scripting language. The OHRRPGCE does not use version numbers, but rather named versions, starting with the "handshake" release on November 29, 2002.

On May 19, 2005 the engine was open-sourced under the GPL-2.0-or-later, and since then has been developed by a team of dedicated programmers. Not long after this, the engine was successfully ported from QuickBasic to FreeBasic to run natively on Windows and Linux. The OHRRPGCE gained the ability to play sound files as well as other music formats with the release of "Ubersetzung" on September 21, 2007.

The engine was later ported to Mac OS X in the Zenzizenic release (May 6, 2011), and to Android in the Callipygous release (April 4, 2016), as well as Amazon Fire TV Android consoles. A number of OHRRPGCE games have been released on the Google Play, Steam, Itch.io, and other stores, as well as on the discontinued Ouya and Gamestick console systems.

In 2017, versions Dwimmercrafty and Etheldreme added mouse support to the game editor and preliminary support to the game player, which was completed in Fufluns in 2020.
