= Core (video game) =

Online video game

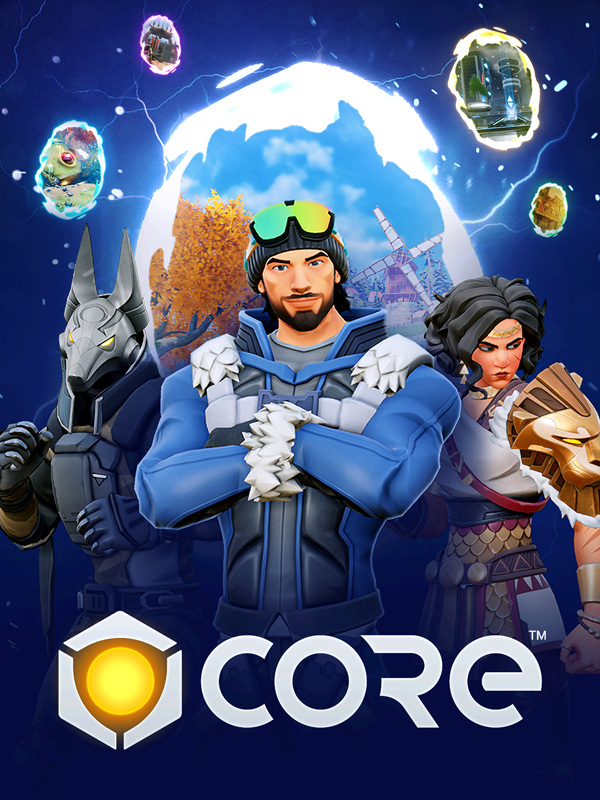
- Developer: Manticore Games
- Publisher: Manticore Games
- Directors: Frederic Descamps; Jordan Maynard
- Engine: Unreal Engine 4
- Platform: Windows
- Release: Early access; April 15, 2021
- Genres: Game creation system, massively multiplayer online
- Modes: Multiplayer, single-player

Core is a free-to-play online video game platform with an integrated game creation system, developed by Manticore Games. It was released as an open alpha version on March 16, 2020, and became available as Early Access on April 15, 2021. Core hosts user-generated games that are designed for an older teen and adult audience. Core's game creation system is designed to simplify video game creation in order to allow more individuals to develop games. Manticore Games, the developer of Core, was co-founded by Frederic Descamps and Jordan Maynard in 2016 and is based in San Mateo, California. Core is based on a similar concept as other gaming platforms for user-generated games such as Roblox. On September 25, 2025, Manticore Games released Out of Time to Epic Games, a standalone multiplayer co-op roguelite built on top of Core.

== Game creation system ==
Core's system allows for the development of up to 32-player multiplayer games and single-player games. Core's game creation system supports modication and combination of built-in game assets, a method which often is referred to as kitbashing, and there are third-party tools which makes importing game assets such as wavefront .obj files possible. Core allows users to code using the Lua programming language using an extensive built-in API. Games made with Core can not be exported into standalone games; however, they can be shared and played in Core.

== Events ==
On December 11, 2019, Core entered a closed alpha phase, where all users were required to sign a non-disclosure agreement. On March 16, 2020, Core entered a public, open alpha phase. In September 2020, Core partnered with Dungeons & Dragons and created a competition wherein players competed to build the best Dungeons & Dragons-themed game. The winner was a game called Forgotten Cisterns.

In December 2020, two games, Mining Magnate and Roll 'Em, were the first games on the Core platform to hit 100,000 plays. On December 17, 2020, Core started the three-week "Holiday Jam" game jam, with the theme of "Winter Wonderland" and $20,000 in prizes.

In June 2022 Core, released a reworked character creation system, which allows different visual parts to be combined for more customization. At the same time, integration with MetaMask was implemented.

In January 2024, the MetaMask wallet and Web3 integration were deactivated, due to its limited use.

== Fundraising ==
In September 2019, Manticore Games announced that they had raised $30 million to fund Core through Series B funding. In September 2020, it was announced that Manticore Games had raised a further $15 million, of which the largest contributor was the video game company Epic Games. The interest of Epic Games in funding Manticore was tied by Dean Takahashi of VentureBeat into a desire to create a “metaverse”, wherein several different gaming platforms are interconnected. In March 2021, Manticore Games announced that they had closed a $100 million Series C funding round and described Core as a “creator multiverse.”

== Reception ==
Core has received mixed reviews from critics. Tyler Wilde writing for PC Gamer gave a mixed review of Core, describing its game creation system as "fun", but finding that the character models were "ugly", and that they had stiff animations, as well as that the in-game weaponry and interfaces were not fun to use. Graham Smith of Rock Paper Shotgun wrote that the platform "can't help but create shabby recreations of triple-A games". Jason Fanelli from MMORPG.com “My mind was absolutely blown. Something that takes massive studios multiple years and millions of dollars was accomplished in front of my eyes in the same amount of time it took me to write this sentence.” In Collider, Marco Vito Oddo writes “If the project grabs enough attention, and if developers/operators Manticore can give all the support a project this big demands, Core can easily become to games what YouTube is for video content.” About the monetization model of the platform, Scott Baird writes in ScreenRant “One of the most exciting things about Core is its revenue split, which offers 50% to its creators, allowing users to make a profit from their in-game titles.”
