= GDevelop =

Open-source game engine

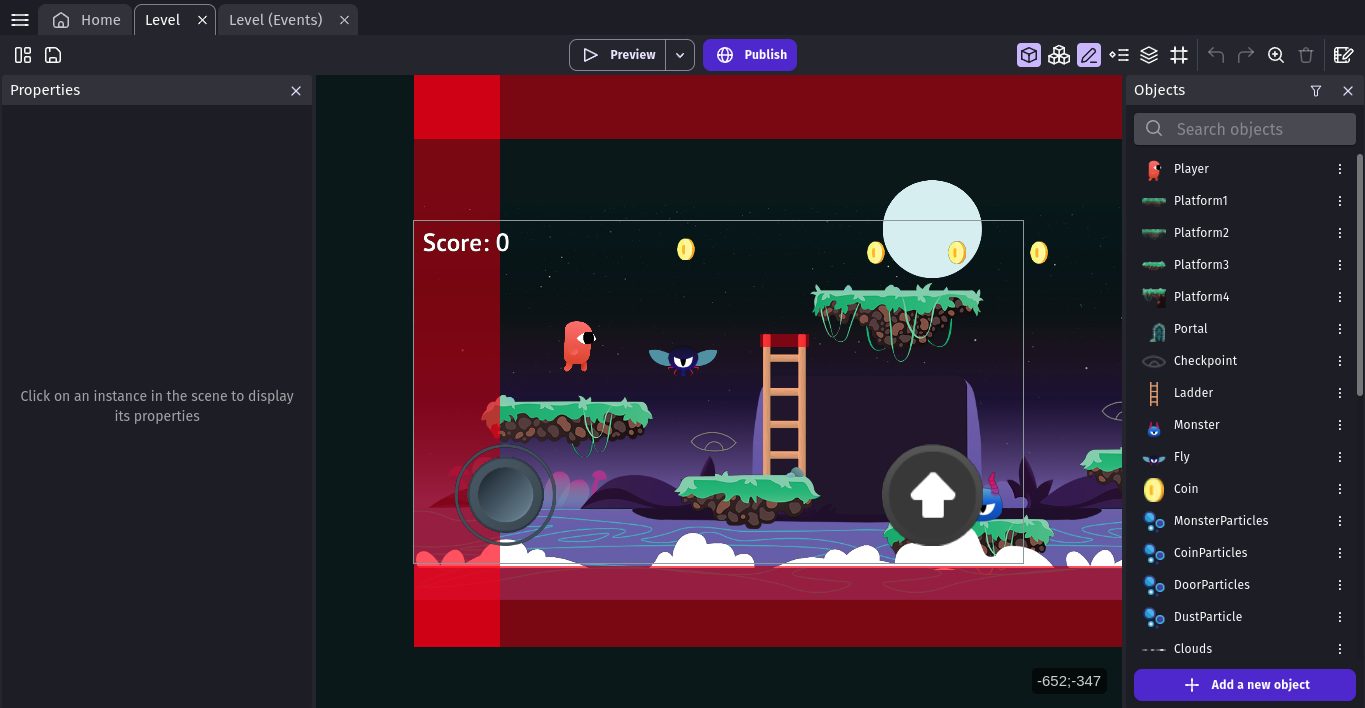
- Screenshot of GDevelop version 5-5.2.169
- Original author: Florian Rival (4ian)
- Developers: Florian Rival (4ian), Davy Hélard (D8H), Clément Pasteau, Alexandre Sapet, Victor Levasseur, Aurélien Vivet (Bouh), Arthur Pacaud (arthuro555), Todor Imreorov (blurymind), Franco Maciel (Lizard-13)
- Release: August 11, 2008; 18 years ago
- Stable release: 5.6.285 / 21 October 2026; 2 days ago
- Written in: C++, JavaScript
- Operating system: Windows, Linux, macOS, Web browser
- Platform: Linux, macOS, Windows, iOS, Android, HTML5, Universal Windows Platform
- Available in: English, Community Provided Translations
- Type: Game creation system Game engine Game integrated development environment
- License: MIT License
- Website: gdevelop.io
- Repository: https://github.com/4ian/GDevelop

GDevelop is a 2D and 3D cross-platform, free and open-source game engine, which mainly focuses on creating PC and mobile games, as well as HTML5 games playable in the browser. Created by Florian Rival, a software engineer at Google, GDevelop is mainly aimed at non-programmers and game developers of all skillsets, employing event based visual programming similar to engines like Construct, Stencyl, and Tynker and it also includes tools for AI-assisted development of behaviors and event-based logic. As it was distributed under an open-source license, GDevelop has been adopted in games education, ranging from primary schools to university courses. with over 10,000 students using it in schools and universities worldwide by 2025. It has also been used by educators and researchers to create learning and serious games. Reviews praise its accessibility for prototyping but note limitations in managing large projects and advanced 3D workflows.

== Game creation without programming languages ==
GDevelop aims to allow creators to create video games without any programming languages. They use these methods to allow this:

=== Event-based logic ===
GDevelop's primary focus is to allow all users to create games without code or a programming language. This is accomplished via an Event system, which creates logic by monitoring for conditions on when to trigger, and actions to take once the event conditions are met. The majority of events are presented in normalized language, so creators can avoid having to understand coding concepts found in many programming languages.

GDevelop's integrated AI assistant can also be used to automatically generate events based on natural language requests. Independent reviews note that this assistant enables artificial intelligence-assisted development by allowing users to create or modify events, behaviors, and gameplay elements via natural-language prompts in a "Build for me" mode, though results can vary and require iterative refinement.

=== Behaviors ===
Behaviors allow for advanced combinations of pre-built functions and events to add logic like physics-based movement, pathfinding, acting as a platform or platform character game, allowing to move the object with the mouse or touch, transitions, etc. Behaviors can be added to game objects, and the same object can have several behaviors. Behaviors can also be created through the Event system, enabling users to extend the existing set of behaviors without writing code. The AI assistant can use these behaviors to construct gameplay elements or portions of games based on user-defined prompts.

== Other features ==
GDevelop has Web, Local and Mobile clients. The web client allowing for game development directly through the browser and saving to a cloud storage solution. Both Web and Local versions share the majority of their feature-set. The mobile version has a more limited feature set to comply with Google Play Store and Apple App Store regulations. A non-exhaustive feature-set available to clients include:

=== Extensions ===
User-made extensions can be created to allow for custom events (functions), behaviors, or objects. Existing events can be turned into extensions from within a project's event sheet. These extensions can be shared within the IDE to the entire community and can be added within a few clicks. Extensions can also implement new engine capabilities such as Kongregate API integrations or full masking support and improve the quality of the creator's game. Some things extensions can add gamepad support and cheats like the Konami code.

=== JavaScript language support ===
Although GDevelop's primary focus is using the event system to enable development without any programming language code, a JavaScript code block can also be used in place of any event.

In addition to using JavaScript code blocks for game logic, this also allows advanced users to extend the capabilities of events by directly manipulating the engine, expanding the capabilities of the engine.

=== Monetization support ===
GDevelop supports AdMob, Facebook ads allowing for advertising in the form of video, banner, interstitial screen and link to purchase. GDevelop also has extensions for integrating games on CrazyGames, Poki, Steamworks and more platforms.

=== Mobile editor app ===
GDevelop is available as a mobile app, optimized for both iOS and Android. Free accounts can store a few projects in the cloud, and premium accounts have access to more projects, AI assistant usage and online game exports. This allows users to create games on Android and iOS devices, with cross-save support, meaning users can start a project on their mobile device and continue on their desktop, or vice-versa.

=== Game analytics ===
Users can opt to collect analytics data from their games, including the number of times the game has been played, the number of players, user retention over time, and more. All of this data is collected anonymously and data collection complies with all current international data protection regulations.

=== Shader effects ===
Introduced in beta 84, GDevelop currently supports effects applied to each layer of a game scene. Shaders allow for advanced graphical effects, such as drop shadows, reflections, scanlines and color swapping, without having to create custom art for the effect.

=== Built-in content editors ===
Gdevelop's IDE also has built-in editors for graphics and audio. Piskel is integrated for editing art, and JFXR is integrated for creating sound effects.

=== One-click export ===
Games can be exported directly to Android, Windows, Linux, and Web platforms. It is possible to make a local export that allows for manual iOS, Android, or desktop OS compiling, as well as export to platforms like Kongregate, itch.io, Google Play, etc.

=== gd.games: GDevelop's own game hosting platform ===
GDevelop also allows unlimited one-click builds to be published on their own game hosting platform, gd.games, even for free accounts. This gives game creators access to permanent URLs, creator profiles and more integrated analytics for their games.

== Supported platforms ==
GDevelop allows users to compile games into stand-alone games, without requiring the software to run.

The following platforms are supported for One-click export:

- Windows 8/10/11
- macOS
- Linux
- Android
- iOS
- HTML5 (Web)

Additionally, the projects can be exported locally and manually compiled by installing traditional development toolkits.

== Technologies used ==
For games, GDevelop uses GDJS, a JavaScript engine, with PixiJS and Three.js as 2D and 3D renderers. The editor interface is in React and uses WebAssembly to manipulate projects using the Core classes written in C++. Both the editor interface and games are packaged using Electron.

GDevelop 4 used a GDCpp, a C++ engine, as well as GDJS, a JavaScript engine. GDCpp uses SFML and GDJS used Pixi.JS as a renderer. The editor interface was written in C++ and was essentially based on the library SFML for multimedia management and on wxWidgets user interface. The software also used Boost and TinyXML. The IDE and GDCpp were packaged via a standard C++ compiler. In May 2025 GDevelop announced Playgrama Bridge technology compatibility.

=== History ===
According to the main author of the software:

"The idea with GDevelop is making game creation accessible to anyone, from beginners to seasoned game developers. GDevelop allows you to create the logic of your game using visual events, composed of conditions and actions. You can also build your game objects by composing pre-defined and customizable behaviours. This means that the entry barrier to learning the syntax and idioms of a programming language is removed. For people that are not developers, it's a way to quickly get up and running with an intuitive interface. Lots of people love sandbox games. GDevelop is a sandbox - but what you can do with it is unlimited."

GDevelop's initial 1.0 release was in 2008, on a foundation that was primarily C++ and had a more native OS focus. Over the years more and more features were added such as tilemap support, a particle system, and limited network support. Leading up to 2018, discussions around migrating GDevelop to a more portable and platform-agnostic base were made, and in January 2018 GDevelop 5 was released.

Until GDevelop 5, the main engine was the C++ engine (GDCpp). GDevelop 5 dropped support for it in favour of the JavaScript engine (GDJS), first introduced on July 1, 2013. The reason for dropping GDCpp was because it had issues across platforms, could not run in the browser or on phones due to the renderer (SFML) it was using, and GDevelop was lacking contributors in general to support both a JavaScript and a C++ engine. It is planned to bring a native engine back in the long term, but not in the short term

GDevelop 5 included a complete rework of the IDE to begin using web technologies, like PixiJS and React. Support around GDevelop 4 was shifted over to GDevelop 5 to bring focus on enhancing the future of the engine.

Since GDevelop's launch, additional features and functionality have continually been added, such as BBText support, Dialogue Support via Yarn, layer-based shaders via PixiJS Shaders, and native mobile apps to develop games on Android and iOS devices. Development and enhancement of the platform continues from 4ian and a group of repeat contributors.

3D support was added to GDevelop 5 on May 18, 2023, along with other changes. However, reviewers note limitations in managing large projects and advanced 3D workflows prior to recent updates.

== See also ==
- Construct (game engine)
- Scratch (programming language)
- Clickteam Fusion
