= Pressure Cooker (video game) =

1983 video game

- Developer: Activision
- Publisher: Activision
- Designer: Garry Kitchen
- Platform: Atari 2600
- Release: NA: 1983
- Genre: Action

Pressure Cooker is a video game for the Atari 2600 designed by Garry Kitchen and released by Activision in 1983. The player is a short-order cook at a hamburger stand who must assemble and package hamburgers to order without letting ingredients or hamburgers fall to the floor.

Kitchen made three earlier games for the Atari 2600, including Keystone Kapers with Activision. He developed the game idea after seeing burgers moving out on a conveyor belt at a Burger King. Upon the game's release, contemporary reviews in found the game relatively unoriginal, while other reviews complimented its graphics.

== Gameplay ==
In the assembly room, the player must collect the right ingredients and assemble the hamburger.

Once a hamburger is assembled, the player then enters the wrapping room and drops it down one of the chutes.

Pressure Cooker is set in a restaurant called "The Grille". The player controls a cook named Short-Order Sam via the joystick to move him across the two playfields: the assembly room and the wrapping room. The game is played by either one player, or two-players taking turns. The game select option on the Atari 2600 allows for more difficult modes of gameplay where the player has less time to complete a burger order.

Orders for specific burger toppings appear in the assembly rooms electronic order board, where the player can either grab the necessary ingredients spewed out by the food dispenser machine. Items tossed out of the food dispenser can either be collected by Sam or rejected by bouncing them off his belly. When a burger is completed, the player must grab the it and take it to the Wrapping and Sacking Machine and place it in the correct chute.

The player starts with 50 performance points displayed at the left of the open flame oven. Performance points are earned when the general score (displayed above the oven) reaches over 10,000 points. Points are lost when any condiment is wasted by not being collected or rejected by Sam or too much of the same requested item is placed on one burger. More points are lost when the player delivers the hamburger to the wrong chute or a burger is placed outside the chute, or if a hamburger falls off the conveyor belt. Points are gained by collecting condiments, placing them on burgers, and delivering a completed burger to the correct chute. The game ends when the Performance Rating is dropped to zero, or the scoring limit of 999,999 is reached.

== Development ==
Pressure Cooker was designed by Garry Kitchen. Prior to the game, Kitchen had made the Atari 2600 games Space Jockey, a port of Donkey Kong and Keystone Kapers. Kitchen was inspired to make the game when in line at a Burger King and saw the burgers move on a conveyor belt. The game was developed in about eight months.

The music in Pressure Cooker was written by a professional jingle writer. The Atari 2600 could only produce certain notes, leading to Kitchen purchasing an electronic keyboard and going through which notes the system could perform and then telling the jingle writer he could only use those notes for the music.

== Release and reception ==
Pressure Cooker was released in 1983. From contemporary reviews, a reviewer in The Video Game Update stated the game was fast-paced bright and colorful with a sense of humor while noting "we couldn't get really excited about [Pressure Cooker]" and that the game "just doesn't have enough of a spark of originality to make it stand out from a very crowded field of cute games." Michael Blanchet of Computer Fun stated the game was a good test of one's memory but that it was "too repetitive to qualify as fun." The review felt it was too similar to previous Atari 2600 games such as CommaVid's CakeWalk and lacked the charm and lunacy of a game like BurgerTime.

From retrospective reviews, Brett Weiss in his book Classic Home Video Games, 1972-1984 declared Pressure Cooker a "delightful game" complimenting colorful details of the kitchen and the games animation, while concluding that it was "hard on the brain (quick thinking is a must), but easy on the eyes."

Pressure Cooker was included in the compilation Activision Anthology.
