= Garry Kitchen's GameMaker =

1985 game creation system

- Original author(s): Garry Kitchen
- Developer(s): Activision
- Initial release: 1985; 40 years ago
- Platform: Commodore 64, Apple II, IBM PC
- Type: Game creation system

Editing a ghost in SpriteMaker

Garry Kitchen's GameMaker is an integrated development environment for the Commodore 64, Apple II, and IBM PC compatibles, created by Garry Kitchen and released by Activision in 1985. It is one of the earliest all-in-one game design products aimed at the general consumer, preceded by Broderbund's The Arcade Machine in 1982. Several sample files are included: a demo sequence featuring animated sprites and music, a recreation of Pitfall!, and a birthday greeting.

Two add-on disks are available for the Commodore 64 version: Sports, and Science Fiction. These include sprites, music, and background elements for loading into GameMaker.

== Construction ==
GameMaker is divided into five tools, each of which consists of a graphical interface controlled with the joystick:

- SceneMaker - for creating background graphics
- SpriteMaker - for creating movable objects (i.e., sprites)
- MusicMaker - for composing musical scores
- SoundMaker - for creating sound effects
- The Editor - for programming the actual game

The programming language used by GameMaker is reminiscent of other early programming languages like BASIC, but with several proprietary and tightly integrated graphics and sound facilities.

Rather than enter the language via keyboard, GameMaker uses a novel contextual menu-based system. The user selects possible instructions, and then customizes the active objects of the instruction, such as variable names or numbers.

== Limitations ==
Some limitations of Gamemaker are imposed by the Commodore 64 architecture, and some by the software itself:

- Only eight sprites may be displayed at once (a C64 limit)
- Each sprite and background may have a maximum of four colors, out of a palette of sixteen (a C64 limit)
- Only two stationary background screens may be employed per game (a GameMaker limit)
- Only 3553 total bytes are available for game resources — including sounds, music, sprites, and code (a GameMaker limit)
- The games themselves may not access the disk (a GameMaker limit)

== Reception ==
Arnie Katz in Ahoy! stated that with GameMaker "a professional designer could use Gamemaker to produce a commercial-quality game, and even amateurs will be surprised and gratified". Computer Gaming World called GameMaker "excellent". Compute's! Gazette called it "a thorough, complete package that makes it relatively easy to design arcade games that actually work."

== See also ==
- The Arcade Machine (1982)
- Pinball Construction Set (1983)
- Adventure Construction Set (1985)
- Shoot'Em-Up Construction Kit (1987)
- Arcade Game Construction Kit (1988)
