= GameSalad =

Computer authoring tool

- Developer: GameSalad
- Stable release: 1.25.61
- Operating system: Mac OS X 10.7 or later, Windows 7, 8, 8.1, 10
- Type: Game creation system
- Website: gamesalad.com

GameSalad Creator is an authoring tool developed by GameSalad used by educators and non-programmers alike. It consists of a visual editor and a behavior-based logic system. GameSalad is used in over 223 schools. GameSalad is used by consumers and creative professionals such as graphic designers, animators, and game developers for rapidly prototyping, building and self-publishing cross-platform games and interactive media. The application runs on both Mac OS X and Windows computers. Access to a Mac is required for publishing to iTunes, but all other supported publishing platforms are accessible for both Mac and Windows users.

== History ==
On December 21, 2009, Macworld Expo partnered with Gendai Games, the developer of GameSalad, for the Macworld 2010 GameSalad Challenge to promote Mac and iPhone game creation before and during the Macworld 2010 conference.

On November 20, 2010, GameSalad unveiled a new "Free to Make" model, making basic membership free to all users, including iOS publishing. It discontinued free memberships in 2015 due to decline in revenue.

By March 2011, over 8,500 games were created using GameSalad Creator. Gravonaut, a 2010 scrolling platformer, was one of thirty such games to reach the top 100 on the iTunes App Store.

On June 11, 2012, GameSalad unveiled a Windows port of the Mac program, allowing Windows users to create games for iPhones. The basic concept is the same, however major changes to the layout were made and some features are as of yet unsupported.

Between October 3, 2012 and November 27, 2012; GameSalad laid off approximately half of their staff.

== Behavior system ==
GameSalad provides a graphical user interface for describing the rules and the behavior of game objects, called Actors, without knowledge of programming or scripting languages. Behaviors are components of an actor that can either instantaneously, or persistently, affect the actor depending on the rules and conditions that govern them. The application comes with a library of behaviors (for movement, changing attribute states, affecting collision, saving, etc.) that can be inserted into rules and other behavior groups to create new effects.

== Major features ==
=== Multi-Platform publishing ===
GameSalad has one common web-based interface for publishing to multiple platforms such as the iPhone or Mac. GameSalad can also publish to Android-based devices such as the Nook, and to HTML5.

=== Tables/arrays ===
Users can use tables to access mass amounts data efficiently. These tables are readable and writable.

=== Game preview ===
GameSalad has a specific preview mode for debugging and testing the performance and functionality of games. There's a GameSalad Viewer application that can be installed separately onto a users mobile device so that they can click a toolbar button inside GameSalad to preview a project directly on their device through a wireless network.

function startGame() {
 myGamePiece = new component(30, 30, "red", 10, 120);
 myGamePiece.gravity = 0.05;
 myScore = new component("30px", "Consolas", "black", 280, 40, "text");
 myGameArea.start();
}

var myGameArea = {
 canvas : document.createElement("canvas"),
 start : function() {
   this.canvas.width = 480;
   this.canvas.height = 270;
   this.context = this.canvas.getContext("2d");
   document.body.insertBefore(this.canvas, document.body.childNodes[0]);
   this.frameNo = 0;
 },
 clear : function() {
   this.context.clearRect(0, 0, this.canvas.width, this.canvas.height);
 }
}

=== Scene editor ===
Users can place and manipulate actors in a scene. Actors are added to the scene by dragging and dropping. Actors in a scene can be organized into different layers to change how actors are visualized (rendering order, parallax scrolling, etc.).

=== Integrated physics ===
GameSalad uses a rigid-body physics simulator for handling realistic motion and collision. Users can manage and optimize how objects collide by organizing actors with tags. Users can choose to have an actor collide with a group of many other types of actors.

=== Expressions ===
For advanced users, GameSalad has an expression editor to define complex behavior and state changes with mathematical expressions and a library of functions.
