= Multiverse (video games) =

Collection of interconnected virtual worlds

In the context of video games, a multiverse can refer to:

- a multiverse virtual world or MetaGalaxy: a collection of interconnected virtual worlds that allows users to travel within and between these virtual worlds.
- multiverse video game: a collection of video games similar to an endless arcade The term is used to describe multigame massively multiplayer online games, that provide players with access to many instances of, often user-generated, subgames. These multigame massively multiplayer online games share some features with the Metaverse while lacking others. There is no clear distinction between multiverse video games and sandbox video games that allow players to create and share creations with other players.

Sharded virtual worlds, for example Ultima Online, are similar to multiverse virtual worlds, and sharded virtual worlds occasionally have been described as multiverses. However, travel and communication between instances of sharded virtual worlds (so-called “shards”) are usually less well supported than in typical multiverse video games and often require a server transfer of a player's character.

== Features ==
A common feature of multiverse video games is the possibility to access subgames without leaving the multiverse game. Optional features include a virtual "lobby" that serves as starting point or hub to access subgames, the ability of players to choose and customize an avatar that is used in subgames, the ability of players to communicate with other players of the multiverse even if they are not in the same shared virtual world, and the ability of players to contribute user-generated content to the multiverse, e.g., virtual objects, avatars, or virtual worlds.

== Origin ==
Several popular massively multiplayer online games have been compared to the Metaverse due to their wide range of user-generated virtual worlds, but many of these virtual worlds are not persistent worlds and lack seamless long-distance travel. Furthermore, instead of providing a single virtual world shared by all players, these games provide multiple instances of virtual worlds that are shared by a limited number of players. Popular examples include Roblox, Minecraft, Fortnite Creative, VRChat, Rec Room, etc. The term “multiverse” is used to simultaneously communicate similarities and differences between these video games and the concept of the Metaverse. A notable example of this use is Manticore Games’ description of their video game Core as multiverse or “creator multiverse”.

== See also ==
- Metaverse
- Sandbox game
- Video game
- Virtual world
