= Garry Kitchen =

American video game designer

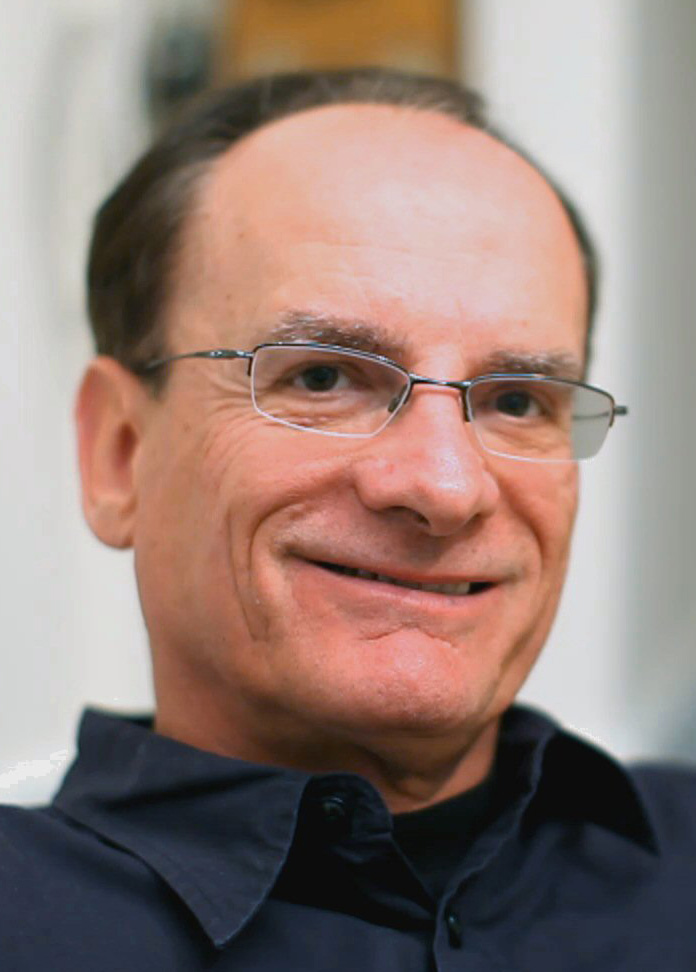
- Kitchen in 2013
- Born: August 18, 1955 (age 71); Washington, D.C., United States
- Education: Fairleigh Dickinson University (BS)
- Occupation: Video game designer
- Employer(s): Activision; Viacom Media Networks
- Known for: Co-founder of Absolute Entertainment and Skyworks Interactive
- Notable work: Donkey Kong (Atari 2600 port); Keystone Kapers; Garry Kitchen's GameMaker
- Relatives: Dan Kitchen (brother)

Garry Kitchen (born August 18, 1955) is a video game designer, programmer, and executive best known for his work at Activision during the early years of the company's history. He has developed games for the Atari 2600, Commodore 64, Nintendo Entertainment System, and Super Nintendo Entertainment System, as well as co-founded Absolute Entertainment with ex-Activision developers. His port of Donkey Kong for the Atari 2600 was a major hit for Coleco, selling over 4 million copies. His other 2600 work includes Keystone Kapers and Pressure Cooker for Activision and Space Jockey for U.S. Games. He also wrote Garry Kitchen's GameMaker and The Designer's Pencil for the Commodore 64.

== Career ==
Raised in New Milford, New Jersey, Kitchen graduated from Saint Joseph Regional High School and received a B.S. in electrical engineering from Fairleigh Dickinson University in Teaneck, New Jersey in 1980. Before his video game career, Kitchen developed electronic toys at Wickstead Design Associates, in Cedar Knolls, New Jersey. In 1979, Kitchen was an engineer on Wildfire, a handheld electronic game distributed by Parker Brothers. After Wildfire, in 1982, Kitchen co-invented the handheld electronic game Bank Shot, a pool simulation also distributed by Parker Brothers. Bank Shot was named one of the Ten Best Toys of 1980 by OMNI magazine. Kitchen was awarded U.S. Patent #4,346,982 "Electronic Pool Game", for Bank Shot.

Kitchen was president and CEO of Absolute Entertainment from 1986 to 1995. In 1995, Kitchen and his longtime business partner David Crane founded Skyworks Technologies, an early internet game company which created Candystand.com and pioneered the category of online advergames. Kitchen and Crane sold the controlling interest in Skyworks in 2007 and left the company in September 2009.

From 2010 to 2012, Kitchen was the Vice President of Game Publishing for Viacom Media Networks, working in the Nickelodeon Kids and Family Games Group. In that role he was responsible for game content on AddictingGames.com and Shockwave.com, at the time two of the largest U.S.-based online game sites. In 2012, Kitchen and his team at Viacom launched the AddictingGames Mobile App for the Apple iPhone, which went to #1 in the Apple App store in 72 hours. The AddictingGames Mobile App was nominated for a 2012 Webby Award in the category of Games (Handheld Devices).

Since 2012, Kitchen has worked as an independent technical expert in legal matters concerning video game and mobile app design and development, patent infringement and invalidity, copyright infringement, general software development, video game industry history and business issues. Kitchen has performed expert witness consulting for clients such as Nintendo, Sony Interactive Entertainment and Ubisoft.

Kitchen, along with his brother Dan Kitchen and David Crane, founded Audacity Games in November 2020 to develop Atari 2600 games to be played on retro consoles. They plan to release these games as both physical copies alongside digital versions that are emulator-friendly. The first title, Circus Convoy, a collaboration between Kitchen and David Crane, went on sale March 13, 2021.

Kitchen is on the Board of Advisors of the National Video Game Museum as well as Fairleigh Dickinson University's FDUArts Advisory Board.

== Games ==
=== Atari 2600 ===
(Source)

- Space Jockey (1982, U.S. Games)
- Donkey Kong (1982, Coleco) arcade port
- Keystone Kapers (1983, Activision)
- Pressure Cooker (1983, Activision)
- Circus Convoy (2021, Audacity Games), with David Crane

=== Commodore 64 ===
(Source)

- The Designer's Pencil (1984, Activision)
- Ghostbusters (1984, Activision), additional programming
- Garry Kitchen's Gamemaker (1985, Activision)
- Crossbow (1988, Absolute Entertainment), with others, arcade port

=== Nintendo Entertainment System (NES) ===
(Source)

- Stealth ATF (1989, Activision), with Rob Harris
- A Boy and His Blob: Trouble on Blobolonia (1989, Absolute Entertainment), co-design and programming, with David Crane
- Destination Earthstar (1990, Acclaim Entertainment), with Rob Harris
- Battletank (1990, Absolute Entertainment)
- The Simpsons: Bart vs. the Space Mutants (1991, Acclaim Entertainment), lead design and programming, with others
- The Simpsons: Bart vs. the World (1991, Acclaim Entertainment), design and programming, with others

=== Super NES ===
(Source)

- Home Alone (1991, THQ), design
- Super Battletank (1992, Absolute Entertainment)
- Super Battletank 2 (1994, Absolute Entertainment), design and additional programming

=== iOS ===
- Arcade Hoops Basketball (2008, Skyworks Technologies)
- Match 3 Poker (2009, Skyworks Technologies)
- Skyscrapers (2009, Skyworks Technologies)
- Iron Horse (2010, AppStar Games), Design
- Fling Pong - The Planets (2010, AppStar Games)
- Addicting Games Mobile (2011, Viacom Media Networks), Executive Producer
