= NabiscoWorld =

American advergaming website

- Website type: Internet games
- Available in: English
- Founded: 1999; 27 years ago
- Dissolved: 2013
- Owner: Nabisco
- Creators: Nabisco, Skyworks Technologies
- Founder: Nabisco
- Commercial: Yes
- Registration: Optional
- Launched: 1999; 27 years ago
- Current status: Defunct

NabiscoWorld was an American advergaming portal set up by Nabisco in association with Skyworks Technologies. The website opened in 1999 as the second games portal set up with Skyworks' support after opening Candystand in 1997. Alongside its launch, NabiscoWorld set up a survey regarding online habits, with the adult demographic favoring games during office breaks.

The first version of the website was designed as a "virtual amusement park" with games and sweepstakes. As of 2004, the website housed games for 17 brands while still being a heavy target of criticism for its excessive usage of brand messaging, especially towards children, and the concerns raised by promoting childhood obesity. The website, alongside Candystand, had a significant child audience, even though the main demographic was the adult one. As of May 2005, 60% of the accesses were from adults.

At the end of 2012, following the creation of Mondelez, the website added an announcement saying that, due to changes, the games were removed from the site. In early 2013, Snackworks took over the former NabiscoWorld website.
