= The Arcade Machine =

1982 video game

- Publisher: Broderbund
- Designers: Doug Carlston; Chris Jochumson
- Programmer: Louis Ewens (Atari)
- Platforms: Apple II, Atari 8-bit
- Release: 1982
- Genres: Game creation system, fixed shooter

The Arcade Machine is a game creation system written by Chris Jochumson and Doug Carlston for the Apple II and published by Broderbund in 1982. Louis Ewens ported it to Atari 8-bit computers. Broderbund ran a contest from January–June 1984 where the best user-created game was awarded a prize of $1,500 in hardware and software. Jochumson also wrote Track Attack for Broderbund.

== Gameplay ==
The game allows players to create alien attacks like those seen in Galaxian. The inbuilt editor allows players to: design/animate enemies, players and explosions; give enemies instructions on moving/firing; drawing backgrounds/title screens, creating sound effects/music, and setting various gameplay rules. Finished games can be saved to a self-booting disk to allow them to run without this program.

== Reception ==
John F. Besnard reviewed the game for Computer Gaming World, and stated that "The product itself provides a tremendous amount of power to the user. Try a few of the demo games supplied on the back of the disk to see the versatility potential of the product."

The New York Times described the game as a "hierophant" due to giving non-programmers the ability to create games; furthermore, the publication suggested that with a bit of aesthetic improvement, The Arcade Machine would "be a game one can play almost forever".

In 1984, InfoWorld deemed it a "fabulous program," and compared it favourably to Pinball Construction Set. InfoWorld's Essential Guide to Atari Computers cited it "a real tour de force".

Steve Panak of ANALOG Computing wrote, "The Arcade Machine is not for the weak of stomach, nor for the weak of mind. Complexity is a key word here. However, despite its complexity, the program is surprisingly user-friendly, thanks to excellent documentation." In the conclusion he warned, "Many, many, many hours are needed to create and hone your game to perfection-and that's if you're not a perfectionist."

The game was "a best seller", according to the September 1984 issue of Creative Computing.
