= RPG Maker =

Video game creation system software series

- Original author: ASCII
- Developers: Enterbrain; Gotcha Gotcha Games
- Release: December 17, 1992; 33 years ago (RPG Tsukūru Dante 98)
- Stable release: RPG Maker With / April 11, 2024; 2 years ago
- Written in: JavaScript, HTML5, Ruby (programming language)
- Platform: PlayStation; PlayStation 2; PlayStation 3; PlayStation 4; Super Famicom; Game Boy Color; Game Boy Advance; Nintendo DS; Nintendo 3DS; Nintendo Switch; Sega Saturn; PC-8801; PC-9801; MSX2; Microsoft Windows; macOS; Linux
- Available in: Japanese, English, Korean, Chinese, Russian
- Type: Game creation software
- License: Proprietary
- Website: www.rpgmakerweb.com

RPG Maker, known in Japan as RPG Tsukūru (RPGツクール; sometimes romanized as RPG Tkool), is a series of programs for the development of video games generally for role-playing game (RPGs) and adventure game genres, originally created by the Japanese group ASCII. The Japanese name, Tsukūru, is a pun mixing the Japanese word tsukuru (作る), which means "make" or "create", with tsūru (ツール), the Japanese transliteration of the English word "tool".

The RPG Maker series was originally released primarily in Japan, but it was translated by fans in Taiwan, South Korea, China, Russia, and North America with RPG Maker 2000 and RPG Maker 2003. Most of the later engines have been officially translated to English and created by successors, Enterbrain and Gotcha Gotcha Games.

== PC versions ==
RPG Maker is a program that allows users to create their own role-playing video games. Most versions include a tile set-based map editor (tilesets are called chipsets in pre-XP versions), a simple scripting language for scripting events, and a battle editor. All versions include initial premade tilesets, characters, and events, which can be used in creating new games. One feature of the PC versions of RPG Maker programs is that a user can create new tilesets and characters, and add any new graphics the user wants.

Despite being geared towards creating role-playing video games, the engine also has the capability to create games of other genres, such as adventure games (like Yume Nikki), story-driven games, or visual novels with minimal tweaking.

=== RPG Tsukūru Dante 98 ===
According to Enterbrain, RPG Tsukūru Dante 98, released on December 17, 1992, was the first software of the RPG Maker series, although there were a few versions of RPG making software by ASCII preceding it, dating back to 1988. This, along with its follow-up RPG Tsukūru Dante 98 II, was made for NEC PC-9801, and games created with these programs can be played on a Windows computer with emulators called Dante for Windows and D2win, respectively. RPG Maker was a product that came from various programs that ASCII Corporation had included in ASCII along with other users' code submitted to it, which the company decided to expand and publish into the standalone game-making toolkit.

=== RPG Maker 95 ===
RPG Maker 95 was the first Microsoft Windows-based RPG Maker software. Despite being an early version, RPG Maker 95 has both a higher screen resolution and higher sprite and tile resolution than the following versions.

However, RM95 retains a prominent flaw: The protagonist-sprite always appears to be walking (due to automatic alternating between two frames), even when it is not going anywhere. This flaw was fixed in all subsequent versions of RPG Maker. Additionally, the sprites of subsequent RPG Maker versions have three frames for each orientation, rather than only two per orientation as in RM95, because the subsequent versions include sprite-frames for when the sprite is standing still.

RM95 also has two basic flaws in its "event"-editing system: The first flaw is that once an event is created, it is not possible to directly delete it. The second flaw is that once a sprite-graphic is added to an event, it is not possible to delete that sprite-graphic from the event. Both of those flaws were fixed in subsequent versions of RPG Maker.

=== RPG Maker 2000 and 2003 ===
RPG Maker 2000 (also referred to as RM2k) was the second release of RPG Maker for Microsoft Windows and is the most popular and used RPG Maker so far. While it is possible to do more with RM2k, it uses lower resolution sprites and tiles than RPG Maker 95, but it does not have a noticeable limit of 'sprites'. Unlike RM95, which can only use one 'set', RM2k can use an unlimited number of sprite sheets with specific sizes for each type. The tilesets also have a similar non-limitation, but because tiles must be entered into a database, there is a limit on the number of tiles. This limit, however, is rarely a problem (normally 5000), and even when it is, an unofficial patch exists which can bump most limits much higher at the risk of potential game corruption. It does not support text output and can program only two buttons, Z and X. There is text in dialog boxes, by means of overlaying sprites, or maps laid with text, but not plainly on the screen.

As a result of an oversight, RM2K contains a flaw in its message-editing options, in that it is not possible to edit the message that is shown when an enemy is killed or destroyed. In the subsequent version, RM2K3, that problem was eliminated by removing the enemy-kill message.

RPG Maker 2003 (also referred to as RM2k3) is largely an improvement of RM2k. RM2k games can be ported to RM2k3 (but not back to RM2k; the conversion is permanent), and most resources are interchangeable. The main difference is the introduction of a side-view battle system similar to that found in the Final Fantasy games on the Super NES and the Sony PlayStation. This was the first version made by Enterbrain, which had previously been a part of ASCII. The popularity of this version among the Japanese RPG Maker community has led to it getting a notable unofficial patch known as the Maniacs Patch, which adds new features and functionality to the engine.

=== RPG Maker XP ===
RPG Maker XP (also referred to as RMXP) was released on 16 September 2005. It is the first RPG Maker which can use RGSS (Ruby Game Scripting System) based on Ruby, making it far more powerful than previous versions programming-wise. Many normal, simplified features present in RM2k(3), however, have been removed. Most of these features have been programmed with RGSS and distributed online. RMXP runs at 1024x768 resolution (though games made in it run at 640x480), while offering four times the playable area of its predecessors. By default, games run at 40 frames per second, though the game's scripts can be modified to set the framerate to any value. Additionally, it allows greater user control over sprite size (there is no specific image size regulation for sprite sheets) and other aspects of game design. This more open-ended arrangement, coupled with the inclusion of RGSS, makes RPG Maker XP more versatile than older versions in the series, at the cost of a steeper learning curve. This was named after Windows XP, which was active from 2001 to 2014.

The Pokémon Essentials pack, one of the main methods of making Pokémon fan games, was exclusive to RPG Maker XP and never ported to any later engine, causing XP to be widely used for such games more than a decade later, such as in making Pokémon Uranium. It was taken down in 2018 due to a cease and desist order by Nintendo, though it continues to circulate on the internet.

=== RPG Maker VX and VX Ace ===
A screenshot of a user-created map in RPG Maker VX

RPG Maker VX was released in Japan on December 27, 2007, and in the West on February 29, 2008. The frame rate was increased to 60 frames per second, providing smoother animation. The engine still used RGSS, but the game's default programming was overhauled to allow more freedom for scripting in new features. A new editor and RTP were included, this time in a much simpler "blocky" style. The default battle system is comparable to that of the Dragon Quest series or its predecessor RM2k, with a head-on view of the battlefield and detailed text descriptions of each action taken.

The lack of support for multiple tilesets when mapping, however, represented a notable downgrade from the engine's predecessor, leaving the player with only a finite number of unique tiles with which to depict all the game's environments. Multiple player-made workarounds were created.

RPG Maker VX Ace was released in Japan on December 15, 2011, and the West on March 15, 2012. It was later made available through Steam, and is also available physically. VX Ace, an upgraded version of VX, addressed the tileset issue. Battle backgrounds were reintroduced and are separated into top and bottom halves. Spells, skills, and items can all now have their own damage and recovery formulas, although a quick calculation method reminiscent of the older RPG Maker versions is available. The VX RTP was redesigned for VX Ace, and a new soundtrack featuring higher quality techno-pop tracks was included. With VX Ace came a large quantity of DLC Resource Packages offered by Enterbrain, also available through Steam.

=== RPG Maker MV and MZ ===
Released by Degica on October 23, 2015, RPG Maker MV includes a large number of changes over previous versions, with multiplatform support, side-view battles, and high-resolution features. It is the first engine in the series to use JavaScript instead of RGSS, with the addition of plugins. Completed games can be played on PC and mobile devices. RPG Maker MV also goes back to layered tilesets, a feature that was removed in RPG Maker VX and VX Ace. Unlike RPG Maker XP, which allowed users to manually choose which layers to build on, MV automatically stacks tiles on top of other tiles. It also came out on consoles under the name RPG Tsukūru MV Trinity. It was originally announced to only be on PlayStation 4 and Nintendo Switch, but was later announced to also be on Xbox One. This release was later cancelled. It was released on Nintendo Switch and PlayStation 4 in Japan on November 15, 2018, and was released in North America and Europe in September 2020.

RPG Maker MZ was released worldwide on August 20, 2020. MZ's new features include the Effekseer particle system, an autosave function, and often-requested XP-style autolayer mechanics. Like MV, it allows users to develop plugins using JavaScript. RPG Maker MZ received mostly positive feedback from users, who praised its additional features and the return of the XP layer mechanics, though its similarity to RPG Maker MV drew a mixed response.

=== RPG Maker Unite ===
RPG Maker Unite is an asset for the Unity game engine based on RPG Maker. It was released on the Unity store in May 2023 and on Epic Games Store in February 2024.

=== RPG Maker U2U ===
RPG Maker U2U, developed and published by Gotcha Gotcha Games, is an upcoming successor to RPG Maker Unite. One of the main features of RPG Maker U2U is that Maps can now be made using P2D (Perspective 2D). U2U also supports existing RPG Maker MV and MZ 2-D tiles, as they both use the same tile standard in P2D maps. Unlike Unite, U2U is a standalone application, but it is still built on top of the Unity game engine.

== Console versions ==
=== RPG Tsukūru Super Dante ===
The first console RPG Maker, RPG Tsukūru Super Dante, debuted in 1995 for the Super Famicom, as a port of RPG Tsukūru Dante 98. RPG Tsukūru Super Dante was later broadcast via the Super Famicom's Satellaview accessory.

RPG Maker GB is the first handheld system version of RPG Maker.

=== RPG Maker ===
In 2000, RPG Maker was released for the Sony PlayStation, but only a limited number of copies were made for releases outside of Japan. The software allowed user-made characters and monsters through Anime Maker, which was separate from the RPG Maker, which required saving to an external memory card, but there was a limit to how many user-made sprites and monsters could be used in RPG Maker. Also, in Anime Maker, the user could create larger sprites for a theater-type visual novel in which the player could animate and control characters, but these sprites were much larger and unusable in RPG Maker.

The RPG Maker interface was somewhat user-friendly, and battles were front-view style only. Items, Monsters, Skill/Magic, and Dungeons had a small limit cap, as did the effects of any given Item, Magic, or Skill (9,999). Items were all inclusive; Weapons and Armors were created in the Items interface. The types of items were as follows: None (mainly used for Key Items), Weapon, Armor, Key (up to eight sub types), Magic (for binding Magic created in the Magic interface to an item), Healing, and Food (which raises stats and EXP, or experience points in which this particular software is the only one of the series to do so natively).

Events were a separate save file from the System file, and are referred to as Scenario files. This is how the user could make multiple parts to one game, provided the user had enough memory cards and card space to create the files.

=== RPG Maker Fes ===
A version for the Nintendo 3DS was released by NIS America on June 27, 2017. While it remains portable on a small screen, users can create games on the go and also download games to play as well. The game received some criticism, with NintendoWorldReport saying that the title would be more suitable for hardcore RPG fans, who want to create their own game, rather than for every type of player. Games completed can be uploaded to the RPG Maker Fes Player app for those to download and play on their own systems. It is the second RPG Maker version to receive a limited edition (the previous one being RPG Tsukūru DS), which includes a CD soundtrack in a jewel case containing all the soundtracks in the game, and a full-color paperback artbook. It is the first RPG Maker on consoles/handhelds to receive a digital release.

=== RPG Maker With ===
In 2024, Gotcha Gotcha Games and NIS America released RPG Maker WITH for Nintendo Switch on October 11, 2024, and PlayStation 4 and 5 on February 21, 2025. It was called RPG Maker WITH due to letting users make an RPG with other people.

== English versions ==
Historically, few early RPG Maker versions had official English releases. Each Windows version has, however, been subject to unlicensed distribution through the internet in some form or other. RPG Maker 95, as well as translation patches for the Super Famicom titles RPG Maker Super Dante and RPG Maker 2, were translated and distributed by a group called KanjiHack. In 1999, KanjiHack closed upon receiving a cease and desist e-mail from ASCII's lawyers. RPG Maker 95 was re-released with a more complete translation under the name RPG Maker 95+ by a Russian programmer, under the alias of Don Miguel, who later translated and released RPG Maker 2000. Later versions, RPG Maker 2003, and RPG Maker XP, were similarly translated and distributed by a programmer under the alias of RPG Advocate.

The first official English release of the PC series was of RPG Maker XP on September 16, 2005. The next two versions of the software, RPG Maker VX and RPG Maker VX Ace both received official English releases. Since 2010, English versions of RPG Maker have been published by Degica, who have also officially released English versions of the older titles RPG Maker 2000 and RPG Maker 2003.

The first official English language console version was the PlayStation version in 2000, simply called RPG Maker, by Agetec. Agetec also localized RPG Maker 2 and 3.

RPG Maker variants are re-implemented by the open-source Open RPG Maker, MKXP and EasyRPG editors and interpreters.

== Reception and legacy ==
By August 2005, the series had sold more than two million copies worldwide. Later Steam releases are estimated to have sold nearly 1 million units by April 2018, according to Steam Spy. Since its first release, the series has been used to create numerous titles, both free and commercial. According to PC Gamer, it has become "the go-to tool for aspiring developers who want to make a game and sell it", due to being "the most accessible game engine around". In addition to games, the series has been used for other purposes, such as studies involving students learning mathematics through the creation of role-playing games, and programming.

One of the earliest notable RPG Maker games was Super Columbine Massacre RPG!, an art game that generated controversy among audiences and Columbine victims. The 2012 video game Ib has been credited with helping popularize its engine's use in developing story-driven and horror games. Some RPG Maker video games have been adapted into multimedia franchises, including Angels of Death, Ao Oni and Corpse Party.

=== Use in media ===
The RPG Maker engine is sometimes used for films as a part of the animation and video game medium. Prominent works made in RPG Maker engine include the web-series Slimey (2011), and Studio Moonchalk's Distortion (2023) and Love and Friendship (2024), all released exclusively on YouTube. Second Love (2025), also produced by Studio Moonchalk, was selected as a part of the Best Animated Film entry at the inaugural Science and Technology Film Festival in September 2025, the first RPG Maker animated film ever to be selected at any international film festivals.

== RPG Maker series timeline ==
Japanese title	English title	Developer	Platform(s)	Japanese release date	English release date	Publisher(s)
Mamirin			PC-8801	1988		ASCII
Dungeon Manjirou			MSX2	1988		ASCII
RPG Construction Tool: Dante			MSX2	February 8, 1990		ASCII
Dante 2			MSX2	February 8, 1992		ASCII
Chimes Quest			PC-9801	1992		ASCII
RPG Tsukūru Dante 98			PC-9801	December 19, 1992		ASCII
Dungeon RPG Tsukūru Dan-Dan Dungeon			PC-9801	April 28, 1994		ASCII
RPG Tsukūru: Super Dante		Kuusou Kagaku	Super Famicom, Satellaview	March 31, 1995 (Super Famicom); April 4, 1996 (Satellaview)		ASCII
RPG Tsukūru Dante 98 II			PC-9801	July 14, 1996		ASCII
RPG Tsukūru 2		Kuusou Kagaku	Super Famicom, Satellaview	January 31, 1996 (Super Famicom); April 22, 1996 (Satellaview)		ASCII
RPG Tsukūru 95			Microsoft Windows	March 28, 1997		ASCII
RPG Tsukūru 95 Value!			Microsoft Windows	November 21, 2001		Enterbrain
Simulation RPG Tsukūru		Pegasus Japan	Sega Saturn, PlayStation	September 17, 1998		ASCII
Enterbrain Collection: Simulation RPG Tsukūru		Pegasus Japan	PlayStation	November 29, 2001		Enterbrain
Simulation RPG Tsukūru 95			Microsoft Windows	May 29, 1998		ASCII
Simulation RPG Tsukūru 95 Value!			Microsoft Windows	November 21, 2001		Enterbrain
RPG Tsukūru 3	RPG Maker	Kuusou Kagaku	PlayStation	November 27, 1997	October 2, 2000	ASCII (Japan); Agetec (North America)
PlayStation the Best: RPG Tsukūru 3		Kuusou Kagaku	PlayStation	November 19, 1998		ASCII
RPG Tsukūru GB		Kuusou Kagaku	Game Boy Color	March 17, 2000		ASCII
RPG Tsukūru 2000	RPG Maker 2000		Microsoft Windows	April 5, 2000		ASCII
RPG Tsukūru 2000 Value!			Microsoft Windows	May 14, 2003	July 7, 2015	Enterbrain (Japan); Degica (worldwide)
RPG Tsukūru 4		Agenda	PlayStation	December 7, 2000		Enterbrain
Uchūjin Tanaka Tarou de RPG Tsukūru GB 2			Game Boy Color	July 20, 2001		Enterbrain
RPG Tsukūru 5	RPG Maker 2	Kuusou Kagaku	PlayStation 2	August 8, 2002	October 28, 2003	Enterbrain (Japan); Agetec (North America)
RPG Tsukūru 2003	RPG Maker 2003		Microsoft Windows	December 18, 2002	April 24, 2015	Enterbrain (Japan); Degica (worldwide)
RPG Tsukūru α			Microsoft Windows, Mobile phone	December 18, 2002		Enterbrain
RPG Tsukūru Advance			Game Boy Advance	April 25, 2003		Enterbrain
RPG Tsukūru XP	RPG Maker XP		Microsoft Windows	July 22, 2004	September 16, 2005	Enterbrain (worldwide); Degica (worldwide)
RPG Tsukūru	RPG Maker 3	Run Time	PlayStation 2	December 16, 2004	September 20, 2005	Enterbrain (Japan); Agetec (North America)
RPG Tsukūru for Mobile			Mobile phone	April 17, 2006		Enterbrain
RPG Tsukūru VX	RPG Maker VX		Microsoft Windows	December 27, 2007	February 29, 2008	Enterbrain (worldwide); Degica (worldwide)
RPG Tsukūru DS			Nintendo DS	March 11, 2010		Enterbrain
RPG Tsukūru VX Ace	RPG Maker VX Ace		Microsoft Windows	December 15, 2011	March 15, 2012	Enterbrain (worldwide); Degica (worldwide)
RPG Tsukūru DS Plus			Nintendo DS	December 15, 2011		Enterbrain
RPG Tsukūru MV	RPG Maker MV		Microsoft Windows, macOS, Linux, HTML5, Android, iOS	December 17, 2015	October 23, 2015	Kadokawa Games; Degica (worldwide)
RPG Tsukūru Fes	RPG Maker Fes		Nintendo 3DS	November 24, 2016	June 23, 2017	Kadokawa Games; NIS America (worldwide)
RPG Tsukūru MV Trinity	RPG Maker MV		PlayStation 4, Nintendo Switch	November 15, 2018	September 8, 2020	Kadokawa Games; NIS America (worldwide)
RPG Tsukūru MZ	RPG Maker MZ		Microsoft Windows, macOS, Linux, HTML5, Android, iOS	August 20, 2020	August 20, 2020	Kadokawa Games; Degica (worldwide)
RPG Maker With	RPG Maker With		PlayStation 4, PlayStation 5, Nintendo Switch	April 11, 2024	October 11, 2024	Gotcha Gotcha Games; NIS America (worldwide)

== See also ==
- Fighter Maker
- Game Maker
- Sim RPG Maker
- Sound Novel Tsukūru
- RPG creation software
