= Impact of the COVID-19 pandemic on the video game industry =

Impact of COVID-19

The video game industry was substantially impacted by the COVID-19 pandemic, as most industries were. The restrictions to social events and movement globally led to a sudden interest in gaming worldwide. This was credited with bolstering the success of many games, particularly games that launched in the March 2020 window, when gatherings were first restricted in many countries. A "gold rush" of video game acquisitions and investment ensued, marked by multi-billion dollar studio deals such as Microsoft's $75bn acquisition of Activision. However, this would prove unsustainable as the rapid pandemic-era growth was temporary. Major layoffs occurred when restrictions began to ease in 2022, and it was clear that the rapid industry expansion would not be sustained.

The industry did experience some direct negative effects in the short term also. Many games were delayed by logistical complications during the transition to remote working. Social gathering restrictions had a major impact on in-person events- notably the discontinuation of E3. It also greatly affected Esports, which were more reliant on in-person events than the rest of the industry. The launch of the ninth generation of consoles took place as planned in late 2020, but was marred by stock availability from supply chain issues until 2023.

== Overview ==
In contrast to many other economic sectors that were drastically affected by the pandemic restrictions, the video game industry was more resilient. Most video game developers, publishers, and operators were able to maintain operations with employees remote working to sustain game development and digital releases, though some productivity issues arose. With many people globally at home and unable to work, online gaming observed record numbers of players during the pandemic as a popular activity to counter physical distancing for society, a practice recommended by the World Health Organization that helped boost revenues for many companies in the gaming industry. However, a 2025 meta-analysis of self-reported player data found that the overall increase in gaming time compared with pre-pandemic levels was small, with the largest surge occurring in the second quarter of 2020 and being more pronounced in Europe than in Asia.

There were negative impacts on the industry, notably with major trade events cancelled or postponed which may have impacted relationships between the smaller developers and publishers. This has particularly impacted indie developers who typically use these events for face-to-face meetings with potential partners to gain funding and publishing support, and caused them to have to delay or cancel projects. Many esport leagues had to alter plans for their games, transitioning from live events to remote play or cancellation altogether. Portions of the sector that relied on physical products, such as retail stores and peripheral makers, as well as those dependent on in-person activities such as quality assurance through playtesting, ratings evaluation, and marketing, also struggled with global stay-at-home orders.

As the origin of the pandemic, China was expected to limit the supply chains for electronics. It did not impact plans for Microsoft and Sony to release the Xbox Series X and PlayStation 5 respectively in fall 2020, though both consoles suffered from stock availability issues early on.

== Industry events ==
Many trade events and expositions for the industry were cancelled or postponed due to bans against public gatherings during the pandemic. The pandemic led to some longer term changes in the way the industry handled public outreach, such as increasing its reliance on digital marketing. The increasing importance of Nintendo Direct streams are an example of this.

=== Discontinued ===
- Electronic Entertainment Expo, also known as E3, was discontinued as a result of the pandemic. E3 2020 was cancelled by March that year. Additional events were arranged to substitute for the trade event, such as Geoff Keighley's Summer Game Fest. E3 2021 was initially scheduled as normal as an in-person event with virtual elements, but the in-person event was cancelled in February 2021 in favor of a digital event only. The event was then cancelled two more times before ultimately being discontinued permanently in December 2023.
- Minecon was last held in 2016 but scheduled to return in 2020 as "Minecraft Festival". After several delays the in-person version was discontinued, continuing only via the virtual Minecraft Live track. There were no further live Minecon events, though Minecraft was present at TwitchCon 2026.
- PAX Dev was a developer-focused PAX event circuit which ran until 2019. It was merged into the other PAX events after the pandemic, with the name applied to various talks and so forth.
- PAX South launched in 2015 but had failed to expand as the other regional variants did; it was formally discontinued during the pandemic.
- Comic-Con Russia and gaming sub-event IgroMir were previously held together. IgroMir 2020 and 2021 were cancelled, and the organisers faced a lawsuit over non-refunded fees. The organisers then "went silent" following the Russian invasion of Ukraine, meaning that the event was not held again after 2019. The name was revived by new organisers with a new venue from 2025.

=== Delayed or cancelled ===
- The 2020 Vancouver Retro Gaming Expo in New Westminster was postponed until 25 June 2022.
- The Taipei Game Show, planned from 6–9 February 2020, was postponed until 25–28 June 2020, but was cancelled in March 2020 due to pandemic's escalation.
- The Mobile World Congress, to have been held in Barcelona, Spain, in March 2020 was cancelled as several of the China-based vendors had to cancel plans.
- The 16th British Academy Games Awards, normally presented at a ceremony in London, were moved to a live streamed event due to concerns over the pandemic.
- Paris Games Week, planned for 23–27 October 2020, was cancelled.
- Insomnia66, set to take place 10–13 April 2020 at the NEC, Birmingham was cancelled in March 2020
- COMPUTEX Taipei 2020, planned for 2–6 June 2020, was postponed to 28–30 September 2020, but was cancelled in June 2020.
- The 2020 BlizzCon was cancelled.
- Brasil Game Show 2020, which was planned for 8–12 October 2020, was cancelled.
- South by Southwest in Austin, Texas, was cancelled, though the SXSW Gaming Awards were still awarded through an online announcement in March 2020.
- Emerald City Comic Con planned for Seattle, Washington, in March was cancelled.
- TwitchCon Europe and TwitchCon US were cancelled.
- The 25th QuakeCon event, planned for Dallas, Texas in August, was cancelled.
- San Diego Comic-Con, planned for July 2020, was cancelled.
- The 17th annual Touhou Project dōjinshi convention (Reitaisai) planned in Tokyo, Japan, first planned on 22 March 2020, was postponed until 17 May, before being cancelled on 12 April, five days following the initial announcement of a state of emergency made by the Japanese government.
- Comiket 98, a dōjinshi convention held in Japan, was cancelled.
- PAX West 2020, originally scheduled for 4–7 September 2020 and PAX Australia 2020, originally scheduled for 9–11 October 2020, collaborated with EGX to host PAX Online x EGX Digital, which was held 12–20 September 2020.
- The 2021 Japanese Amusement Expo (JAEPO) was cancelled in a 1 October 2020 announcement.
- Super MAGFest 2021 was initially planned to be made virtual, but also cancelled.
- Gamescom Asia's inaugural event was postponed to 2021.

=== Reduced in scope or made virtual ===
- Several vendors withdrew or scaled plans back to present at PAX East in Boston at the end of February 2020, including Sony Interactive Entertainment, Square Enix, Electronic Arts, Capcom, CD Projekt, and PUBG Corporation.
- Several companies pulled out from the Game Developers Conference (GDC) in San Francisco in March 2020, forcing the organizers to postpone the show to later in the year. However, the event organizers devised a scheme to run the GDC as a virtual conference following a similar schedule across the same set of days by using the streaming services with a subset of the planned events that are presented through the streaming media and was made available online a week later. This included the Game Developers Choice Awards and Independent Games Festival presentations.
- Gamescom 2020 was held online.
- Tokyo Game Show that was scheduled to run 24–27 September 2020, was cancelled, though online events were held in its place.
- EGX 2020, planned for 17–20 September 2020, was cancelled, though online events were held 12–20 September 2020.
- MAGWest 2020 and 2021 were both held virtually.
- TennoCon 2020 and 2021 were conducted virtually.
- 2020 Gaming Community Expo scheduled for Orlando, Florida, in June was cancelled. The event moved online as a charity marathon.

== Esports ==
Most esports events are based on online games, but are typically played in local arenas to reduce network latency between players as well as to provide an audience. The pandemic caused many of these events to either become cancelled or switch to a fully online format for 2020:

- ESL Pro League Season 11, a Counter-Strike: Global Offensive tournament was originally going to be an offline event with the finals taking place at Denver, Colorado, United States. However, due to the pandemic, ESL announced that both the regular season and the finals would be split into two regions: Europe and North America. The regular season and the finals were played entirely online.
- The competitions for non-rhythm games of the ninth season of Konami Arcade Championships (KAC), which were to be held from 22 and 24 February at e-sports GINZA Studio, were postponed indefinitely. This did not affect the competitions within Konami's Bemani rhythm games, as they were held earlier that month at the Japan Amusement Expo. On 16 December, Konami announced that the tenth season in 2021 would restrict participation to Japanese players only instead of worldwide as it has been traditionally done since 2012 (which include South Korea, Asia and United States), as a result of the travel restrictions set by the Japanese government; in addition, the finals that were to be held on 6 and 7 March 2021, would be in the GINZA Studio, behind closed doors. On 7 January 2021, Konami extended the qualifying period for the 10th tournament indefinitely while the finals were postponed. On 8 February 2021, Konami announced the 9th tournament would be cancelled. On 22 March 2021, a day after the state of emergency was lifted, the qualifier rounds were announced to end on 20 April.
- 闘神祭2020 (Tōshinsai), a cross-arcade game tournament held in Japan that is co-organised by NTT-esports and Taito, was cancelled. The finals initially scheduled from 16–17 May were postponed to 8–9 August.
- The Overwatch League, in its 2020 season and third overall, planned to implement a home/away approach to regular season play similar to professional sports, with teams travelling across the globe to various homestand events for matches. With the pandemic, numerous changes to the league's plans had to be implemented, which included switching to online matches, reworking the teams' distributions in divisions as some teams were forced to suspend operations, cancelling certain mid-season events, and otherwise reducing the planned schedule of play. During the 2021 season, there were limited homestands by the Chinese teams and Dallas Fuel. To reduce latency during interregional tournaments, teams from the West division (North America and Europe) travelled to the University of Hawaiʻi at Mānoa, as they could connect to a Tokyo-based game server via an undersea communications cable link. The playoffs and finals were originally scheduled to be held as live events in Los Angeles and Arlington respectively, but they were canceled and replaced with the same remote format as earlier due to COVID-19 and Delta variant concerns.
- The League of Legends Rift Rivals and Mid-Season Invitational tournaments were cancelled, with the latter being replaced with the 2020 Mid-Season Streamathon, while 2020 World Championship would be played exclusively in Shanghai using the "isolation bubble" environment. In addition, majority of regional leagues, including League of Legends Championship Series and the League of Legends European Championship were either played in arenas without audience or switched to online formats. Due to national travel restrictions, esports teams of Vietnam Championship Series could not participate in the 2020 World Championship and 2021 Mid-Season Invitational.
- NACE was forced to suspend play until 13 April 2020, on 16 March 2020.
- The 2020 Pokémon World Championships was cancelled by The Pokémon Company including its North American (scheduled for 26–28 June) and global (scheduled for 14–16 August) events.
- The 2020 Nürburgring World Tour, a live event of the 2020 FIA-Certified Gran Turismo Championships season, was cancelled after the 2020 Nürburgring 24 Hours was postponed by the organizers to September. As the online season had begun on 17 March, the decision was made to change the stage that was planned to end on 18 April an "exhibition stage", and to restart the season on 25 April. A teaser trailer for the restarted season indicated that no further live events would be held, having held only one live event in Sydney, Australia. Consequently, the regional and world finals for the series were held as online-based events.
- The live Rocket League World Championship for its 9th season, planned for 24 April 2020 in Dallas, was indefinitely postponed.
- The 2020 Fortnite World Cup was cancelled.
- The International 2020 tournament for Dota 2, set to be held in Stockholm in August 2020, was postponed indefinitely before being pushed back a year and rebranded as The International 2021. That event was to be held with in-person spectators in Bucharest, Romania, in October 2021, but due to new COVID-19 restrictions in the city, it was announced that the event would instead be played behind closed doors at the stadium with only essential personnel present.
- Evo 2020, set to be held in Las Vegas near the end of July, was cancelled. Online events were scheduled before the entire tournament was cancelled due to sexual abuse allegations against its co-founder. Evo Online was held in 2021, with its announcement concurrent with the acquisition of Evo by Sony Interactive Entertainment and Endeavor. It was later announced that the top players at Evo Online would compete at an in-person "Evo Showcase" event at UFC Apex in Las Vegas (owned by Endeavor subsidiary Ultimate Fighting Championship) in November. However on 29 September 2021, Evo announced that Evo Showcase had been cancelled due to COVID-19-related concerns (including Delta variant).
- Mobile Legends: Bang Bang Southeast Asia Cup (MSC) 2020, set to be held in Philippines on 12–14 June 2020, was cancelled.
- Arena of Valor World Cup 2020, set to be held in Vietnam, was cancelled.
- Free Fire Champions Cup 2020, set to be held in Indonesia in April 2020; and Free Fire Worlds Series 2021, set to be held in Mexico, were cancelled.
- The Asia-Pacific Predator League 2020 was postponed to Spring 2021. All of the qualifying teams during the event were to participate in the finale in 2021.
- The Teppen World Championship 2020 was held entirely online. Offline tournaments meant to qualify players to the finals were cancelled due to the pandemic.

While many traditional physical sports games, seasons, and playoffs were cancelled due to the pandemic, the organizing leagues turned to video game equivalents as alternative entertainment, using the professional athletes from their leagues within the games. Some examples of this included:

- NASCAR launched its eNASCAR iRacing Pro Invitational Series on 22 March 2020, featuring NASCAR drivers competing using the iRacing game. The IndyCar Series launched its own IndyCar iRacing Challenge series as well.
- Major League Baseball partnered with Sony to create a short league for 30 professional players playing MLB: The Show.
- The 2021 Pro Bowl for the National Football League, to have taken place in January 2021, was cancelled due to COVID-19, with the NFL opting to use a virtual game in Madden NFL 21 to celebrate the players selected by fans.
- The 11th annual Classic Tetris World Championship (CTWC) which was due to take place in the latter half of 2020 had to switch to an online only tournament. As a result of this, the tournament was expanded. It took place over six weeks, as opposed to 3 days, and introduced a new silver bracket for players who did not qualify for the main 'gold' bracket. The Gold and Silver brackets live on in future CTWC events with the addition of the Bronze bracket .

Television networks which normally would have shown the sporting events that were cancelled have turned to both these replacement sports programs as well as other esport tournaments as replacement programming during the pandemic. On 14 June 2020, the BBC reported that about 22 million sports viewers turned to virtual races when lockdowns were implemented. Questions over the future of esports rose with Formula 1 returning in July 2020.

== Hardware production ==
- Nintendo Switch production in Vietnam had been scaled back due to reduced supply of components out of China because of the quarantines. As a result, supplies for the Switch were significantly reduced in Japan. In its annual report issued in May 2020, Nintendo believed that production would resume normal levels within a few months. Further, Nintendo of America closed its repair center as a preventative measure. The company's headquarters in Redmond, Washington, and the flagship store in New York City were also closed.
- Valve announced that its production on the Valve Index virtual reality headset was reduced due to the impact of the pandemic and would have fewer shipments expected than planned by the release of Half-Life: Alyx.
- Konami delayed release of the TurboGrafx-16 Mini in March due to production chain issues in China due to the pandemic.
- Atari delayed the Atari VCS that was initially supposed to release in March 2020 because of the pandemic.
- Microsoft did not anticipate any delay in the planned release of the Xbox Series X console, according to Phil Spencer as of April 2020. He stated that some games expected near launch may be delayed as a result.
- The Evercade handheld console, originally due to release on 22 May 2020, released sometime between 22 May, and 5 June 2020.
- Nvidia's GeForce 30 series of graphics cards immediately sold out upon their release, due largely to a rise in consumer demand for computer hardware during the pandemic, as well as a lack in proper security against scalpers.

== Sales ==
Generally, sales of video games have increased as a result of stay-at-home and lockdown orders from the pandemic, as people turned to video games as a pastime. The NPD Group reported that video game sales in North America in March 2020 were up 34% from those in March 2019, and video game hardware up by 63% – which included more than twice the number of units of the Nintendo Switch console. Net spending across the first quarter of 2020 in the United States reached US$10.9 billion, up 9% in 2020 compared to 2019 according to NPD. An increase at this point, near the planned end of the eighth generation of video game consoles, was unusual and was attributed to the pandemic. By July 2020, NPD Group reported that the total sales of video game hardware and software within the United States in the first six months of 2020 reached US$6.6 billion, the highest since 2010.

Some specific examples of game software and hardware sales affected by the pandemic include:

- The 2012 game Plague Inc. by Ndemic Creations had a significant increase in sales as a result of the pandemic. The game temporarily became the top-paid app on several regional app stores, beating out the perennial bestseller Minecraft. According to some researchers and game developers, such as cultural historian Carly A. Kocurek, some people worried about the pandemic may have played the game as a means to placate their anxiety. While the game was based on scientific models of the spread of contagious diseases, Ndemic had to remind the players that the game was not meant to be taken as an accurate model for transmission and spread and referred those interested to the Centers for Disease Control and other national and international health organization websites. Ndemic later added a new gameplay mode to Plague Inc, with the goal to try to stop an ongoing pandemic through various possible options by using the work that it developed in coordination with WHO and the Global Outbreak Alert and Response Network. The company also donated US$250,000 to the Coalition of Epidemic Preparedness Innovations and the WHO COVID-19 Solidarity Response Fund to help fight the pandemic and encouraged the players of the game to do the same.
- The 2018 digital adaption of Pandemic by Asmodee experienced an increase in sales.
- Both Doom Eternal and Animal Crossing: New Horizons, major AAA titles released in March 2020, outperformed industry expectations, with Animal Crossing selling more in its opening week in the United Kingdom than all of the previous launches in the franchise combined for the same region.
- Ring Fit Adventure, which involves physical activity, was in high demand in China as a result of the quarantine. Sales led to shortages and price gouging in East Asia and nearby regions. Similar shortages for the game expanded as quarantines and stay-at-home orders came to many Western locations during March 2020.
- Coupled with lowered hardware production, the Nintendo Switch became a high-selling commodity during the pandemic, as it provided entertainment options across all ages, especially with Animal Crossing: New Horizons. Nintendo worked to supply as many units as possible globally to most markets, which led to some resellers using bots to scalp. The Switch's high sales helped to offset low sales of other console hardware within the United States and buoy higher revenues for the sector.
- Among Us rose in popularity through Twitch after streamer Sodapoppin popularised it through the platform in late July 2020.
- Minecraft Dungeons topped Animal Crossing on the Nintendo eShop in North America when they released their new DLC packs: Jungle Awakens and Creeping Winter. They also announced cross-platform features.

== Software releases ==
- An estimated one-third of developers surveyed in 2020 by the GDC stated that COVID-19 caused a delay of the games they were working on, a combination of the pandemic and the remote working conditions. By 2021, this had increased to 44% by 2021 in a subsequent GDC survey. Some games that were delayed included:
  - The Outer Worlds for Nintendo Switch from 6 March – 5 June 2020
  - Someday You'll Return from 14 April – 5 May 2020
  - Hellpoint from 16 April – 30 July 2020
  - Yumeutsutsu Re:Master and Yumeutsutsu Re:After for PlayStation Vita from 23 April – 23 July 2020. The PlayStation 4 versions were never delayed despite confirmation of such.
  - Minecraft Dungeons from April to 26 May 2020
  - Trackmania from 5 May – 1 July 2020
  - Marvel's Iron Man VR from 15 May – 3 July 2020
  - The Wonderful 101: Remastered physical edition from 19 May to 30 June in North America and 22 May – 3 July 2020, in Europe
  - Sword Art Online: Alicization Lycoris from 21 May to 9 July in Japan and 22 May – 10 July 2020, in North America
  - Is It Wrong to Try to Pick Up Girls in a Dungeon? Infinite Combat from early 2020 to 7 August 2020, in Europe and 11 August 2020, in North America
  - Ninjala from 27 May – 24 June 2020
  - Final Fantasy XIV Patch 5.3 from 16 June – 11 August 2020, as well as the game's fourth expansion pack, Endwalker, from Q3 2021 to 7 December 2021
  - Fairy Tail from 25 June – 30 July 2020, in Japan and Europe, and a day later in North America
  - E-School Life for Nintendo Switch and PS4 from 25 June – 30 July 2020, in Japan
  - Fast & Furious Crossroads from May to 7 August 2020
  - Kiss Trilogy for PS4 and Nintendo Switch from 25 June – 27 August 2020, in Japan
  - Kingdom Hearts Dark Road from early 2020 to 22 June 2020
  - No Straight Roads from 30 June – 25 August 2020
  - Ary and the Secret of Seasons from 28 July – 1 September 2020
  - Death Stranding for PC from 2 June – 14 July 2020
  - Wasteland 3 from 19 May – 28 August 2020
  - The Last of Us Part II from 29 May – 19 June 2020
  - Ghost of Tsushima from 26 June – 17 July 2020
  - Monster Hunter World: Iceborne: Title Update 4 from May to 9 July 2020
  - Little Witch Academia: VR Broom Racing from June to late 2020 for Oculus Quest and early 2021 for PlayStation VR, Oculus Rift and SteamVR
  - Rock of Ages 3: Make & Break from 2 June – 21 July 2020
  - Star Wars Episode I: Racer Remaster for Nintendo Switch and PS4 from 12 May – 23 June 2020
  - Phogs! from June to 3 December 2020
  - The Dark Pictures Anthology: Little Hope from mid-2020 to 30 October 2020
  - Mafia: Definitive Edition from 28 August – 25 September 2020
  - Stronghold: Warlords from 29 September 2020, to 9 January 2021, and then finally released at 9 March 2021, after further delays due to problems in the game's multiplayer mode.
  - Blue Fire for PS4, Xbox One and PC from mid-2020 to Q1 2021
  - Kerbal Space Program 2 from early 2020/Q3 2021 and then to 2022 and finally into early 2023.
  - Guilty Gear Strive from late 2020 to 11 June 2021.
  - Warframe Major Update called Duviri Paradox from 2020 to 2021
  - Halo Infinite from 2020 to 8 December 2021
  - Deathloop from 2020 to 14 September 2021
  - The Stanley Parable: Ultra Deluxe from 2020 to 27 April 2022
  - Sky: Children of the Light for Nintendo Switch from 2020 to 29 June 2021
  - No More Heroes III from 2020 to 27 August 2021
  - Kena: Bridge of Spirits from 2020 to 21 September 2021
  - Outriders from late 2020 to 1 April 2021
  - The Medium from 10 December 2020, to 28 January 2021
  - Harvest Moon: One World from 2020 to 2 March 2021, in North America and 5 March 2021, in Europe
  - The Idolmaster Starlit Season from 2020 to 2021
  - Digimon Survive from 2020 to 2021 and finally into 28 July 2022, for Japan and a day later for the rest of the world.
  - Seven Knights: Time Wanderer from June 2020 to 5 November 2020
  - Monstrum physical edition from 22 May 2020 to 23 October 2020
  - Dragon Marked for Death version 3.0 patch for Nintendo Switch from 21 April 2020 to 23 April 2020
  - Everyday: Today's Menu for the Emiya Family from May 2020 to 28 April 2021
  - Crossfire X from 2020 to 10 February 2022
  - Cuphead: The Delicious Last Course DLC from 2020 to 30 June 2022
  - Rainbow Six Extraction from 2020 to 20 January 2022. Additionally, the original title of Rainbow Six Quarantine was renamed to avoid association with the pandemic.
  - Gran Turismo 7 from 2021 to 4 March 2022
  - Tales of Arise from 2020 to 10 September 2021
  - The King of Fighters XV from 2021 to 17 February 2022
  - God of War Ragnarök from 2021 to 9 November 2022
  - Ghostwire: Tokyo from Q3 2021 to 25 March 2022
  - Far Cry 6 from 18 February to 7 October 2021
  - Life Is Strange: Remastered Collection from 10 September 2021, to 1 February 2022
  - Battlefield 2042 from 22 October – 19 November 2021
- Some games also received early releases in certain regions:
  - At GameStop in the United States, Doom Eternal was released a day prior to its release date to separate the crowds from those purchasing Animal Crossing: New Horizons (as both games were officially released on 20 March).
  - AFL Evolution 2 was released on 16 April 2020, a week prior to its original release date. To reduce physical contact, physical copies of the game were initially sold through online retailers only.
  - Final Fantasy VII Remake was shipped early to Europe and Australia so the players living in the "countries that are currently facing the biggest disruption" would be able to play the game on its launch day.
  - The second chapter of Deltarune, which was originally intended to be released as part of the full game, was released for free on 17 September 2021. The game would subsequently adopt an episodic release schedule, with the first four chapters receiving a paid release on 5 June 2025.
- Some games were cancelled:
  - Deliver Us the Moon for Nintendo Switch, having been scheduled for a mid-2020 release.
  - Doom Eternal's invasion mode was cancelled in favor of a single-player horde mode.
  - Minecraft Earth, which released as early access in October 2019, closed on 30 June 2021.
  - Just Cause: Mobile from 2022 to 2023 before being cancelled.

Game publishers and developers have expressed concerns that further extensions of the movement control orders from the pandemic may incur additional delays. One major factor that may cause delays is the ability to capture voice acting without access to studios during physical distancing for society, even though some of members have considered working from residence remotely to avoid troubling situations. An example of this happened with the Western release of Persona 5 Strikers whose voice acting in English was meant to start in April 2020 but was delayed due to the pandemic. The actors later received audio equipment from Atlus so that they could work at home.

== Services ==
As much of the world's population had been quarantined due to the pandemic, video game playing and other Internet use had increased significantly. Steam had over 23 million concurrent players during March 2020, surpassing all previous records while over three billion hours of content were watched on Twitch over the first quarter of 2020, a 20% increase from the previous year's. Microsoft reported a substantial increase in users of its Xbox Game Pass service in the months of March and April 2020, bringing it to over 10 million subscribers. GeForce Now capacity was temporarily exhausted in Europe before additional server capacity was added. While platforms reported record demand and in some cases exceeded server capacity, evidence from self-reported player data synthesized in a 2025 meta-analysis suggests that the average increase in gaming time was modest overall, peaking in the second quarter of 2020.

The additional bandwidth from video games and other Internet services created concerns that critical bandwidth would not be available for medical and other key infrastructure elements necessary to mitigate the spread of SARS-CoV-2. To help reduce demand during peak hours, the Akamai content delivery network for many video games and major digital storefronts such as Xbox Live, PlayStation Network, and Steam capped download speeds and encouraged the users to download at off-peak hours.

During quarantine and lockdown, Ubisoft announced an update for Just Dance 2020 to keep players active: customers who owned the game could access a month of the Just Dance Unlimited service. Ubisoft also announced in its official forum that the second event entitled "Power Gala", which was part of the second season "Feel the Power" in Just Dance 2020, had been postponed. The developer explained that the company wanted to protect its team due to the pandemic, and that "although [their] team still work[ed] hard to make our servers work as smoothly as possible at home", this needed to be resolved by postponing the content. Two tracks from Just Dance Unlimited were made free to make up for the delay.

== Retailers ==
- GameStop and its Canadian subsidiary, EB Games, came under criticism for its overall response to the pandemic. Notably, it received widespread criticism when, after numerous states and provinces issued "stay at home" or "shelter in place" orders requiring non-essential businesses to close up starting in March 2020, it considered its stores an essential business, stating that they provided a "significant need for technology solutions". The chain later revised this decision, closing most locations and leaving only select stores open to provide drive-up delivery of online or by-phone orders to the customers.
- CeX closed all its corporate stores in the United Kingdom on 23 March and asked the franchises to do the same.
- Game X Change, a regional game retailer based in Arkansas, attracted criticism for keeping the retail locations open in areas with stay at home orders.

== Industry trade bodies ==
The Japanese game ratings body Computer Entertainment Rating Organization was forced to close operations from early April through 7 May, and upon reopening, implemented appropriate controls that reduced work hours, which is expected to delay some releases in Japan as they await a rating for retail release.

== Industry support of mitigation and relief efforts ==
- Nintendo of America donated 9,500 N95-rated face masks for first responders in the Washington state region in March after their facility was shuttered during Washington's stay-at-home program.
- Twitch hosted a 12-hour charity stream on 28 March 2020, to raise money for the COVID-19 Solidarity Response Fund. The stream featured games, music and sports celebrities playing games like Fortnite and Uno.
- Several game publishers worked with WHO to support its #PlayApartTogether campaign, encouraging players to continue social engagement in video games via online games instead of through physical means. Eighteen companies initially joined the effort when announced in March 2020, and at least forty more had joined by early April.
- Games Done Quick, a charity-driven speedrunning event, had to move its planned June 2020 event due to the pandemic, but announced it would run a fully online "Corona Relief Done Quick" event from 17 to 19 April 2020, with money raised going to Direct Relief. The event raised over US$400,000. Let's Play group The Runaway Guys added an additional US$200,000 through their third annual 'Colosseum' event, done in remote format (and under the title 'Colosseum Direct') due to the pandemic.
- Humble Bundle offered a "Conquer COVID-19 Bundle" of games and e-books from 31 March to 7 April 2020 with all proceeds going to Direct Relief, International Rescue Committee, Doctors Without Borders, and Partners in Health. Over 200,000 bundles were sold raising over US$6.5 million for the charities.
- The Association for UK Interactive Entertainment worked with the UK's Department for Digital, Culture, Media and Sport to push the government's campaign of "Stay Home, Save Lives" into their members' video games that supported dynamic messaging like within in-game menu screens.
- Former Nintendo of America president Reggie Fils-Aimé and video games journalist Harold Goldberg hosted Talking Games with Reggie and Harold, a seven-part podcast, to raise charitable funds for the New York Video Game Critics Circle to help mentor lower-income and under-served students in New York City impacted by the pandemic.
- Idea Factory International held an online charity auction of an official Hyperdimension Neptunia illustration by series artist Tsunako. After the auction ended, they donated the money from the auction to help UNICEF USA's effort in fighting the virus.
- Some game developers and publishers pledged to donate revenue generated by purchases to COVID-19 relief efforts:
  - Rockstar Games donated five percent of revenue generated by in-game purchases in Grand Theft Auto Online and Red Dead Online in April and May 2020. Its nine worldwide studios donated to local charities, including City Harvest in London and New York, the Centre for Addiction and Mental Health Foundation, Boston Museum of Science, Akshaya Patra Foundation, Connecticut Food Bank, National Black Nurses Association, and Black Girls Code.
  - iNK Stories donated 25 percent of the revenue from sales of the Steam version of Fire Escape.

== Popular games during the pandemic ==
A variety of games became popular over the period. This was largely down to social elements, theming that worked with the cultural zeitgeist of the time, or simply the fortune of launching at the right time.

=== As a social space ===
A number of multiplayer titles grew very popular during the pandemic, as they offered a means of social interaction during a time of isolation. Among the strongest examples of this was Animal Crossing: New Horizons was especially popular, as it could offer the social element as well as a recreation of ordinary daily life activities disrupted by the pandemic. Another very popular game during the pandemic was Grand Theft Auto Online, which reached one of its highest simultaneous player count of 267,000 players at the beginning of 2020. Fall Guys and Among Us were particularly popular also. In the case of Among Us, the title launched several years before but saw a huge wave of popularity during the pandemic.

=== Due to pandemic theming ===
Some non-online games were also thematically compared to the pandemic, such as The Longing and Presentable Liberty. Some older games received a swell of interest due to their theming. This included the Flash game Pandemic 2 (2008), in which players are tasked with developing a deadly virus to wipe out humanity. The game saw a 35-fold increase in player count. The similar title Plague Inc. (2012) became popular but was taken down in China during the pandemic, after the country's cyberspace commission declared it illegal.

=== Due to launch timing ===
The Q1 2020 launch window proved extremely beneficial for several games, as they launched just as social gathering restrictions and the wave of interest in gaming took hold. Major games in this window included Doom Eternal and Animal Crossing: New Horizons. While the games were greatly dissimilar (Doom being a violent first person shooter, and Animal Crossing being a cosy title) the large amount of people playing both led to later comparison to the Barbenheimer phenomenon.

Microsoft Flight Simulator launched in August 2020. While it was not pandemic themed it was seen as an alternative to traveling- at a time when doing so was risky or impossible.

== Notable deaths ==
- John Horton Conway, mathematician and creator of Conway's Game of Life.
- Rick May, voice actor; including the Soldier in Team Fortress 2.

== Aftermath ==
As the COVID-era investment boom waned, the video game industry saw a large number of layoffs. These started in late 2022 and saw tens of thousands of developers lose their jobs, particularly in North America.

== See also ==
- 2023–2025 video game industry layoffs
