= Los Angeles Convention Center =

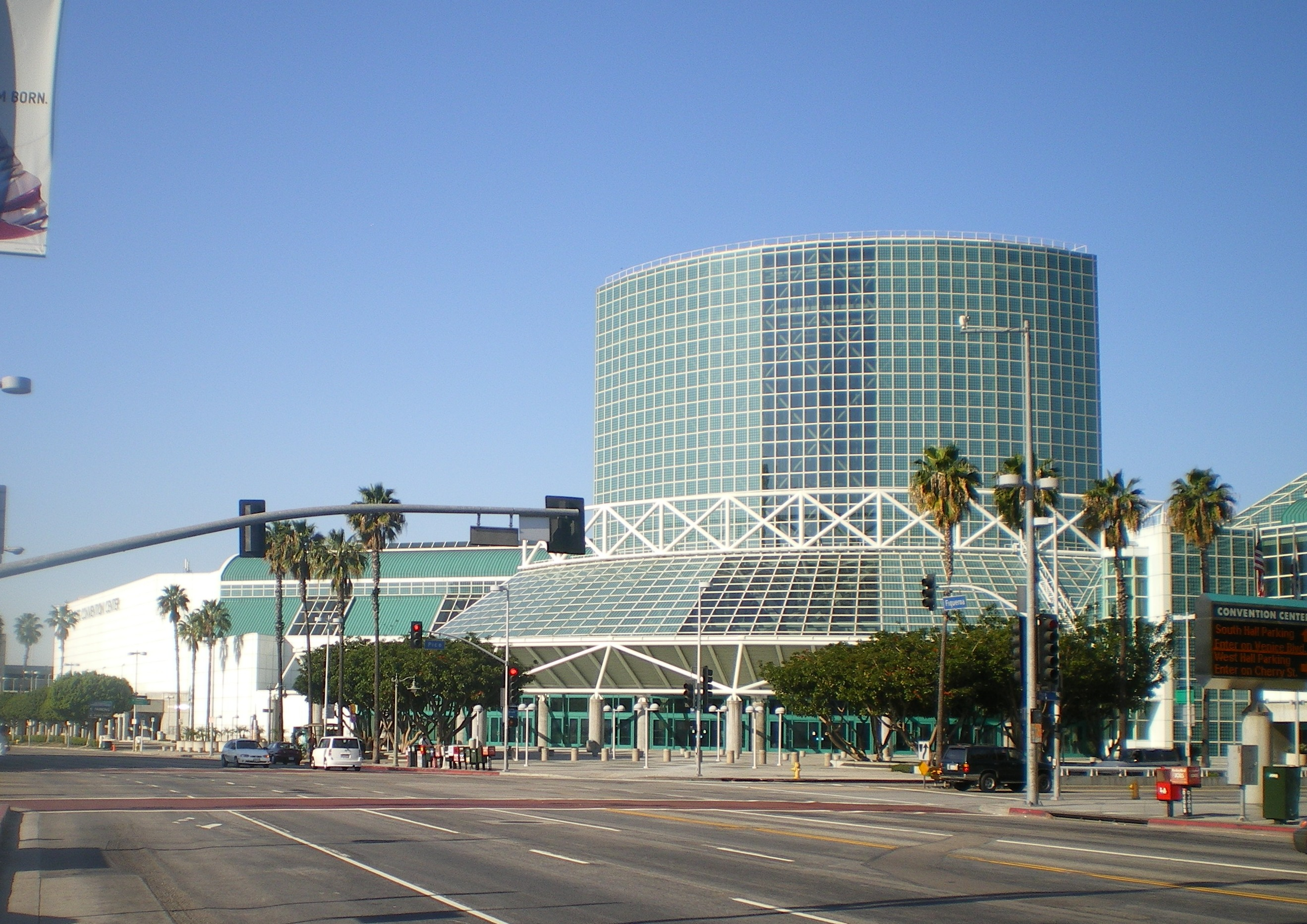
- Los Angeles Convention Center Annex, South Hall entrance at Pico and Figueroa
- Interactive map of Los Angeles Convention Center
- Address: 1201 South Figueroa Street; Los Angeles, California; 90015
- Coordinates: 34.039737°N 118.270293°W
- Operator: Anschutz Entertainment Group; Legends Global
- Public transit: Pico

Construction
- Built: 1971
- Expanded: 1981, 1993, 1997

Website
- www.laconventioncenter.com

The Los Angeles Convention Center is a convention center located in the southwest section of Downtown Los Angeles, California, United States. It hosts multiple annual conventions, major sporting events, and has often been used as a filming location of several TV shows and movies.

== History ==
The convention center, designed by architect Charles Luckman, opened in 1971 and expanded in 1981, 1993 and 1997. It was originally built as a rectangular building, between Pico Boulevard and 11th Street (now Chick Hearn Ct.) on Figueroa Street. The northeast portion of the center was demolished in 1997 to make way for the Staples Center. The Convention Center Annex of green glass and white steel frames, mainly on the south side of Pico, was designed by architect James Ingo Freed.

The area in front of the convention center is known as the Gilbert Lindsay Plaza, named for the late councilman who represented the Downtown area of Los Angeles for several years. A 10-foot (3.0 m)-high monument honoring "The Emperor of the Great 9th District" was unveiled in 1995. The drive between Figueroa Street and the convention center building is also named after Councilman Lindsay.

On March 1, 1983, a tornado caused damages to the roof and upper-level panels. The building was repaired and new convention center lettering signs were installed at a total cost of $3 million.

The convention center served as the main press center (MPC) during the 1984 Summer Olympics.

On September 15, 2008, the convention center became the first in the U.S. and first Los Angeles City building of its age and size in the U.S. to be Leadership in Energy and Environmental Design (LEED) certified for Existing Buildings from the United States Green Building Council.

In 2010, the Anschutz Entertainment Group and businessman Casey Wasserman proposed construction of Farmers Field, a US$1 billion combination football stadium and convention center, meant to attract the return of a National Football League (NFL) team to the Los Angeles area. The development proposal was abandoned in March 2015 as plans for SoFi Stadium and a later rejected NFL stadium proposal in Carson started to get off the ground.

In 2013, the Los Angeles City Council voted to let Anschutz Entertainment Group manage the convention center.

=== Expansion ===
A design competition was held throughout 2015 for the proposed expansion, with final approval coming in September 2025, and construction starting on October 1, 2025.

The expansion will add 190,000 square feet of space by connecting the South Hall and West Hall, in addition to 55,000 square feet of meeting room space, and 95,000 square feet of multipurpose space. It is expected to cost $2.62 billion. Construction is expected to be completed in 2029, with a brief pause for the 2028 Summer Olympics.

== Events ==
The convention center hosts annual events such as the Los Angeles Auto Show, the Abilities Expo, and the Anime Expo.

=== Grammy Week ===
During the week leading up to the annual Grammy Awards, the convention center typically hosts several Grammy week events. Since 2005, the convention center has hosted the MusiCares Person of the Year tribute, which takes place two days prior to the Grammy Awards.

It also hosted the pre-telecast portion of the Grammy Awards (preceding the main telecast at the Crypto.com Arena) until 2013, when the pre-telecast was moved to the Peacock Theater.

The 2021 awards were held in and around the convention center, owing to the COVID-19 pandemic.

=== Emmy Week ===
Following the annual Primetime Emmy Awards ceremony, the convention center hosts the Governors Ball, one of the major Emmy after-parties.

=== 2028 Summer Olympics & Paralympics ===
The convention center will host five sports during the 2028 Summer Olympics. It will host Fencing, Taekwondo, Table Tennis, Judo and wrestling during the Olympics. The following month, it will also host wheelchair fencing, table tennis, taekwondo, judo and boccia during the Paralympics. The convention center will serve as part of the downtown sports park area, including an "Olympic way" live site down Figueroa St.

=== Basketball ===
The Los Angeles Sparks played 11 of their 16 home games during the 2021 WNBA season at the convention center due to scheduling conflicts at their main home venue, the Staples Center, as a result of the COVID-19 pandemic's delays in other league schedules. The convention center was configured with limited seating and drew an average of 1,144 spectators per game.

=== Electronic Entertainment Expo ===
With the exception of 1997, 1998, and 2007 the annual video game trade event Electronic Entertainment Expo (E3) was hosted there between 1995 and 2019. The event was eventually discontinued in 2023 as a result of the COVID-19 pandemic on the video game industry.

== Features ==
The convention center is one of the largest convention centers in the United States with over 720,000 sq ft (67,000 m^{2}) of exhibition space, 147,000 sq ft (13,700 m^{2}) of meeting space, 19.6 million sq ft (1,820,000 m^{2}) of parking, and a 299-seat theater.

The lobby floors in the north half of the building feature two large 140,000 sq ft (13,000 m^{2}) multicolor maps of inlaid terrazzo. The project was installed by artist Alexis Smith in 1993. A map of the world centered on the Pacific Rim covers the entire floor of the main lobby, while a map of the constellations around the north celestial pole covers the floor of the upstairs lobby.

- South Hall (Tom Bradley (Mayor) Exhibit Hall, 347,000 square feet (32,200 m^{2}))
- Kentia Hall (beneath South Exhibit Hall, can be converted into a 415-car parking garage)
- West Hall (Sam Yorty (Mayor) Exhibit Hall, 210,000 square feet (20,000 m^{2}))
- Neil Petree Hall
- Concourse (two-story meeting room bridging over Pico Boulevard)
- 3 food courts
- On-site parking for 5,600 vehicles including electrical charge stations

== See also ==
- William M. Hughes, Los Angeles City Council member, 1927–1929, urged conventions to come to Los Angeles
- List of convention centers in the United States
