= White Chamber (disambiguation) =

White Chamber was part of the medieval Palace of Westminster in London.

White Chamber may also refer to:

- White Chamber (film), a 2018 film starring Shauna Macdonald and Oded Fehr
- The White Chamber, a 2005 video game
