= E3 2023 =

Cancelled 27th annual Electronic Entertainment Expo

Electronic Entertainment Expo 2023
- Status: Cancelled
- Begins: June 13, 2023 (cancelled)
- Ends: June 16, 2023 (cancelled)
- Venue: Los Angeles Convention Center
- Locations: Los Angeles, California
- Country: United States
- Previous event: E3 2022 (cancelled); E3 2021
- Next event: E3 2024 (cancelled)
- Organizer: Entertainment Software Association; ReedPop
- Filing status: Non-profit

The Electronic Entertainment Expo 2023 (E3 2023) would have been the 27th E3, during which hardware manufacturers, software developers, and publishers from the video game industry would have presented new and upcoming products. The event, organized by the Entertainment Software Association (ESA) and produced by ReedPop, was scheduled to take place at the Los Angeles Convention Center from June 13–16, 2023. However, on March 30, the event was officially confirmed to be cancelled due to lack of interest, namely as a result of Xbox Game Studios, Sony Interactive Entertainment, and Nintendo all choosing to forego attending E3 that year, which would have marked the first time since E3 1995 that none of the console manufacturers would have been in attendance. In addition, other gaming-related companies like Sega, Tencent, and Bandai Namco all pulled out of E3 2023 prior to its cancellation. In lieu of that, several publishers made plans to continue with presentations of game announcements during the planned E3 period, while others opted to use more traditional marketing throughout the year.

The ESA initially planned to resume the E3 in 2024, but in September 2023, the ESA stated that the event was cancelled. The ESA announced in December 2023 that the E3 would be discontinued.

== Format and changes ==
The ESA announced in July 2022 that E3 2023 would be the first in person E3 event held since 2019. The 2020 and 2022 events were cancelled outright, while the 2021 event was held in a digital format. ReedPop, which produces PAX festivals, New York Comic Con and Star Wars Celebration, would organize a new format. Three months later, it was announced that the event would include three "Business Days" where the floor would be limited to developers, publishers, retailers, and recognized journalists, while two days at a separate location would be held as "Fan Days" for all members of the public.

Prior to the event, it was announced in January 2023 that none of the first-party publishers would attend the event with Nintendo confirming their absence the following month. Most third-party publishers pulled out two months later.

=== Cancellation ===
On March 30, 2023, E3 2023 was officially cancelled by the ESA. Its president and CEO, Stanley Pierre-Louis, cited a change in the game development timeline since the COVID-19 pandemic, causing companies to have a lack of playable demos. He also made the observation that brands have been more willing to market using digital events rather than in-person ones.

== Alternative events ==
=== Summer Game Fest ===
Summer Game Fest kicked off with a live kickoff show on June 8, 2023, hosted by Geoff Keighley. It continued throughout the month of June. Unlike in previous years where the event was virtually livestreamed, the event was open to the general public.

=== Xbox ===
Xbox hosted an Xbox Games Showcase on June 11, 2023. Another presentation, called "Starfield Direct" that was centered around the Bethesda game Starfield, followed the showcase. Microsoft has confirmed that Xbox would not officially be on the E3 show floor, but would have been co-streaming the digital event.

=== Ubisoft ===
Despite prior reports stating that Ubisoft would attend E3 2023, they announced in late March 2023 that they would do a Ubisoft Forward video presentation on June 12, 2023, instead. Games covered during the event included Star Wars Outlaws, Avatar: Frontiers of Pandora, The Crew Motorfest, and Assassin's Creed Mirage.

=== Nintendo ===
Nintendo, after confirming their absence from the now-cancelled E3 2023, held a Nintendo Direct on June 21, 2023. Many games were announced during the Nintendo Direct such as the new side-scroller platform game Super Mario Bros. Wonder, a remake of the role playing game Super Mario RPG, and Pikmin 4.
