= City Harvest =

City Harvest may refer to:

- City Harvest, a Chicago Family Harvest Church ministry
- City Harvest (United Kingdom), a London-based food charity
- City Harvest (United States), a New York food rescue organization
- City Harvest Church, Singapore
