= E3 =

American video game industry event (1995–2021)

Electronic Entertainment Expo
- Final logo used from 2017 to 2023

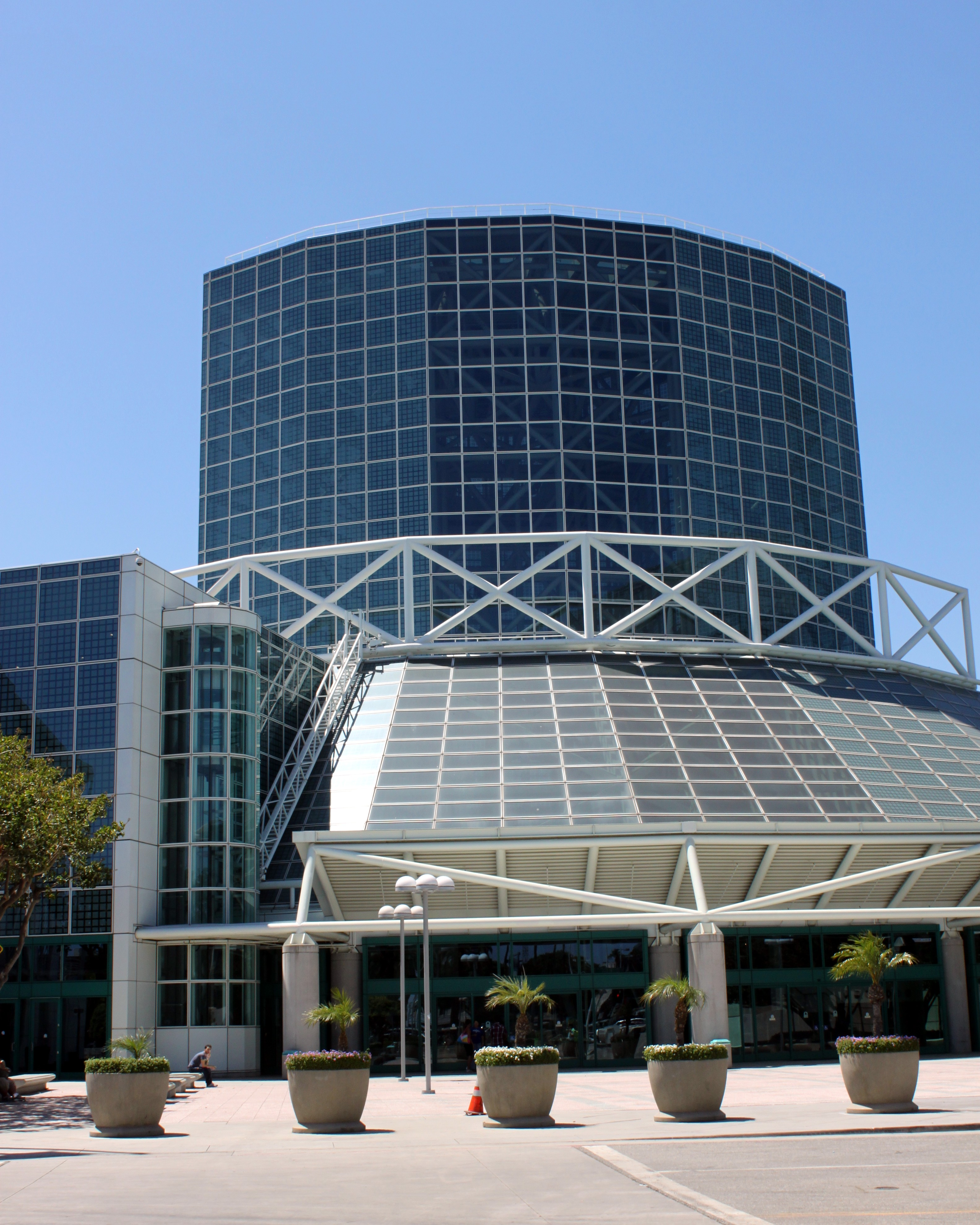
- The Los Angeles Convention Center (west wing view) where the event took place each year
- Status: Defunct
- Genre: Video games; Interactive entertainment
- Frequency: Annually
- Venue: Los Angeles Convention Center
- Locations: Los Angeles, California
- Coordinates: 34°02′23″N 118°16′13″W
- Country: United States
- Years active: 1995–2019, 2021
- Inaugurated: May 11, 1995; 31 years ago
- Most recent: June 12, 2021; 5 years ago
- Attendance: ▼66,100 (2019)
- Organizer: Entertainment Software Association
- Website: e3expo.com

E3 (short for Electronic Entertainment Expo) (Note: Because it was held entirely online, E3 2021 was known as the Electronic Entertainment Experience.) was an premier annual trade event for the video game industry organized and presented by the Entertainment Software Association (ESA). It was held principally in Los Angeles from 1995 to 2019, (Note: E3 1997 and 1998 were held in Atlanta, and E3 2007 was held in Santa Monica.) with its final iteration held virtually in 2021. The event hosted developers, publishers, hardware manufacturers, and other industry professionals who used the occasion to introduce, announce and advertise major upcoming games, hardware, and merchandise to the press. During its existence, E3 was the world's largest and most prestigious annual gaming expo.

E3 included an exhibition floor for developers, publishers, manufacturers, and gaming companies to showcase their titles and products for sale in the upcoming year. Before and during the event, publishers and hardware manufacturers usually held press conferences to announce new games and products. Before 2017, E3 was an industry-only event; the ESA required individuals wishing to attend to verify a professional relationship with the video game industry. With the rise of streaming media, several press conferences were broadcast to the public to increase their visibility. E3 2017 became open to the public for the first time, with 15,000 general-admittance passes for those who wanted to attend.

When being hosted in Los Angeles, E3 was held in the Los Angeles Convention Center. The event was cancelled for the first time in 2020 due to the COVID-19 pandemic, and the event in 2021 was held as a virtual event to mixed reception. The 2022 event was cancelled also due to the pandemic, and with no virtual event held. The ESA had planned to return to a full in-person convention in 2023 with a new format, including a fan convention component at a separate venue in collaboration with ReedPop.

The pandemic further accelerated the use of standalone presentations by individual publishers and media outlets to promote upcoming games directly to consumers, development timelines usually aligned around the convention had been disrupted, and publishers were increasingly concerned over the costs of exhibiting at the convention. E3 2023 was cancelled after all major publishers pulled out of the event. E3 2024 was also cancelled in September 2023 in order to evaluate plans for 2025. On December 12, 2023, the ESA announced that E3 would no longer be held.

The E3 website was updated in August 2025 to say "ESA's conference and trade show is changing directions." ESA launched the inaugural Interactive Innovation Conference (IICON), a spiritual successor to E3, in April 2026. Unlike E3, the event was closed to the public with the aim of connecting video game publishers to other areas of the entertainment industry.

== History ==
=== Origins ===
Before E3, game publishers went to other trade shows like the Consumer Electronics Show and the European Computer Trade Show to display new or upcoming products as well as to pre-sell shipments to retailers for the rest of the year including the late-year holiday season as well as to view for press coverage of upcoming games. As the game industry grew rapidly during the early 1990s, industry professionals felt that it had outgrown the older trade shows. According to Tom Kalinske, CEO of Sega of America, "The CES organizers used to put the video game industry way, way in the back. In 1991, they put us in a tent, and you had to walk past all the porn vendors to find us. That particular year it was pouring rain, and the rain leaked right over our new Genesis system. I was just furious with the way CES treated the video game industry, and I felt we were a more important industry than they were giving us credit for." Sega did not return to CES the following year, and several other companies exited from further CES shows.

Separately, in 1994, the video game industry had formed the Interactive Digital Software Association (IDSA, later becoming the Entertainment Software Association, ESA, in 2003) in response to attention the industry had drawn from the United States Congress over a lack of a ratings system in late 1993. The IDSA was formed to unify the video game industry and establish a commission, the Entertainment Software Ratings Board (ESRB) to create a voluntary standard rating system that was approved by Congress.

E3's longest-used logo (1998–2017)

The industry recognized that it needed some type of trade show for retailers. According to Eliot Minsker, chairman and CEO of Knowledge Industry Publications (which produced and promoted the show with Infotainment World), "Retailers have pointed to the need for an interpretive event that will help them make smarter buying decisions by interacting with a wide range of publishers, vendors, industry influentials, and opinion leaders in a focused show setting." Attempts were made between the video game companies and the Consumer Electronics Association (CEA) which ran CES, to improve how video games were treated at CES, but these negotiations failed to produce a result. Pat Ferrell, creator of GamePro which was owned by International Data Group (IDG), conceived of an idea for starting a dedicated trade show for video games, building off IDG's established experience in running the Macworld convention. Ferrell contacted the IDSA who saw the appeal of using their position in the industry to create a video game-specific tradeshow, and offered to co-found the Electronic Entertainment Expo with IDG.

Though several companies agreed to present at this E3 event, Ferrell discovered that CEA had offered video game companies a dedicated space at the next CES, which would have conflicted with the planned E3 event, requiring the companies to pick one or the other. Most of the IDSA members supported E3, while Nintendo and Microsoft were still supportive of the CES approach. After about three to four months, Ferrell was told by CEA's CEO Gary J. Shapiro that he had "won" and that they had canceled the CES video game event, effectively making E3 the premier trade show for the video game industry.

=== 1995–2006: Growth and success through first decade ===
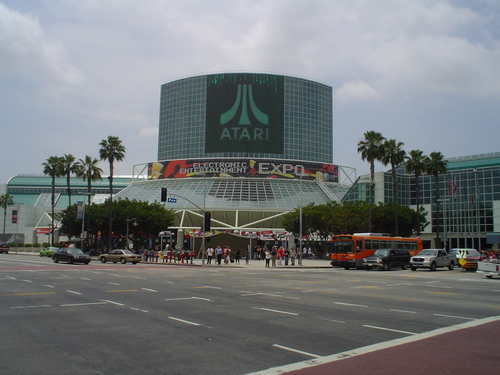
Los Angeles Convention Center during E3 2005, with an Atari banner hanging over the South Hall lobby

The first event was held from May 11–13, 1995 at the Los Angeles Convention Center, which would generally be the convention's location in future years. The organizers were unsure of how successful this would be, but by the end of the convention, they had booked most of the space at the Convention Center, and saw more than 40,000 attendees. In the aftermath of its first year, E3 was already regarded as the biggest event in the video game industry. The IDSA realized the strength of a debut trade show, and subsequently renegotiated with IDG to allow the IDSA to take full ownership of the show and the intellectual property associated with the name, while hiring IDG to help with execution of the event. During this E3, Sega had introduced the Sega Saturn, priced at $399. Sony also introduced the first PlayStation console, with Sony Computer Entertainment North America's president Steve Race coming on stage during their press event to simply say "Two ninety-nine." (as in $299) before leaving the stage to applause. The surprise undercutting price had a significant impact on Sega and the current console war between Sega, Sony, and Nintendo. From then on, E3 was seen to play a major part in other console wars, with journalists reporting on which manufacturer "won" E3 based on their product offerings.

In 1996, IDG and the IDSA tried a Japanese version of E3, in preparation for a worldwide series of events, at the Makuhari Messe in Tokyo (as E3 Tokyo '96) in association with TV Asahi. Although Sony Computer Entertainment was the show's original sponsor, the company withdrew its support in favor of its PlayStation Expo. Sega then pulled out at the last minute, leaving Nintendo the only big-three company to appear. Held November 1–4, 1996, the presence of several other gaming expos and lack of support from Japanese game manufacturers led to reportedly poor turnout and rumored E3 events in Singapore and Canada did not take place.

Due to failed negotiations for the convention space in Los Angeles, the E3 conventions in 1997 and 1998 were held at the Georgia World Congress Center in Atlanta, Georgia. Turnout at these shows was dramatically lower than at the first two E3s, which has been attributed to a declining number of game developers and the fact that many video game companies were based on the West Coast, making the cost of sending staff and equipment to Atlanta prohibitive. The show returned to the Los Angeles Convention Center in 1999, and continued to grow in attendance, ranging from 60,000 to 70,000 attendees.

In addition to the event, E3 started to support (or became associated with) several websites. One was E365, introduced in 2006, an online community which attendees used to network and schedule meetings.

=== 2007–2008: Media and Business Summit ===
Following the 2006 convention, the IDSA—now ESA—found that many exhibitors were worried about the high costs of presenting at the event, spending between $5–$10 million for their booths. They had also found that a larger proportion of attendees were bloggers and attendees who were not perceived to be industry professionals by vendors, managing to secure access to the conference. These additional attendees diluted the vendors' ability to reach out to their target audience, retailers and journalists. Both of these reasons had previously caused the COMDEX trade show to shut down. Several large vendors told the ESA that they were going to pull out of the next E3, which would have had a domino effect on other vendors.

To avoid this, the ESA announced in July 2006 that E3 would be downsized and restructured due to the overwhelming demand from the exhibitors, and would limit attendees to those from the media and retail sectors. For 2007 and 2008, E3 was renamed to the E3 Media and Business Summit, and moved into the July timeframe, about two months later in the year than previous shows. The 2007 show was held at the Barker Hangar at the Santa Monica Airport and other nearby hotels in Santa Monica, California with attendance limited to about 10,000, and was the last time the show was not physically held at the Los Angeles Convention Center. The 2008 event returned to the Los Angeles Convention Center, but also capped attendance at about 5,000.

ESA was harshly criticized for these smaller events. Industry analyst Michael Pachter said that because consumers had been eliminated from attending the events, there was little external media coverage of these E3s, reducing the visibility and commercialization opportunities for publishers, and suggested that without a change, E3 would become extinct. Pachter also found that retailers were less interested in E3 due to the later calendar date. Activision, which had been a member of the ESA since its start, opted to leave the ESA in 2008 and to no longer participate in the E3 event, with their CEO Robert Kotick stating the company was too big for the E3 and ESA at that point, riding on revenue from World of Warcraft.

=== 2009–2015: Return to larger format ===
Responding to the complaints from the previous two years, the ESA announced that E3 2009 would be more open, but capping attendance at about 45,000 and closed to the public, as to achieve a balance between the two extremes. All subsequent E3s took place in June of the calendar year at the Los Angeles Convention Center.

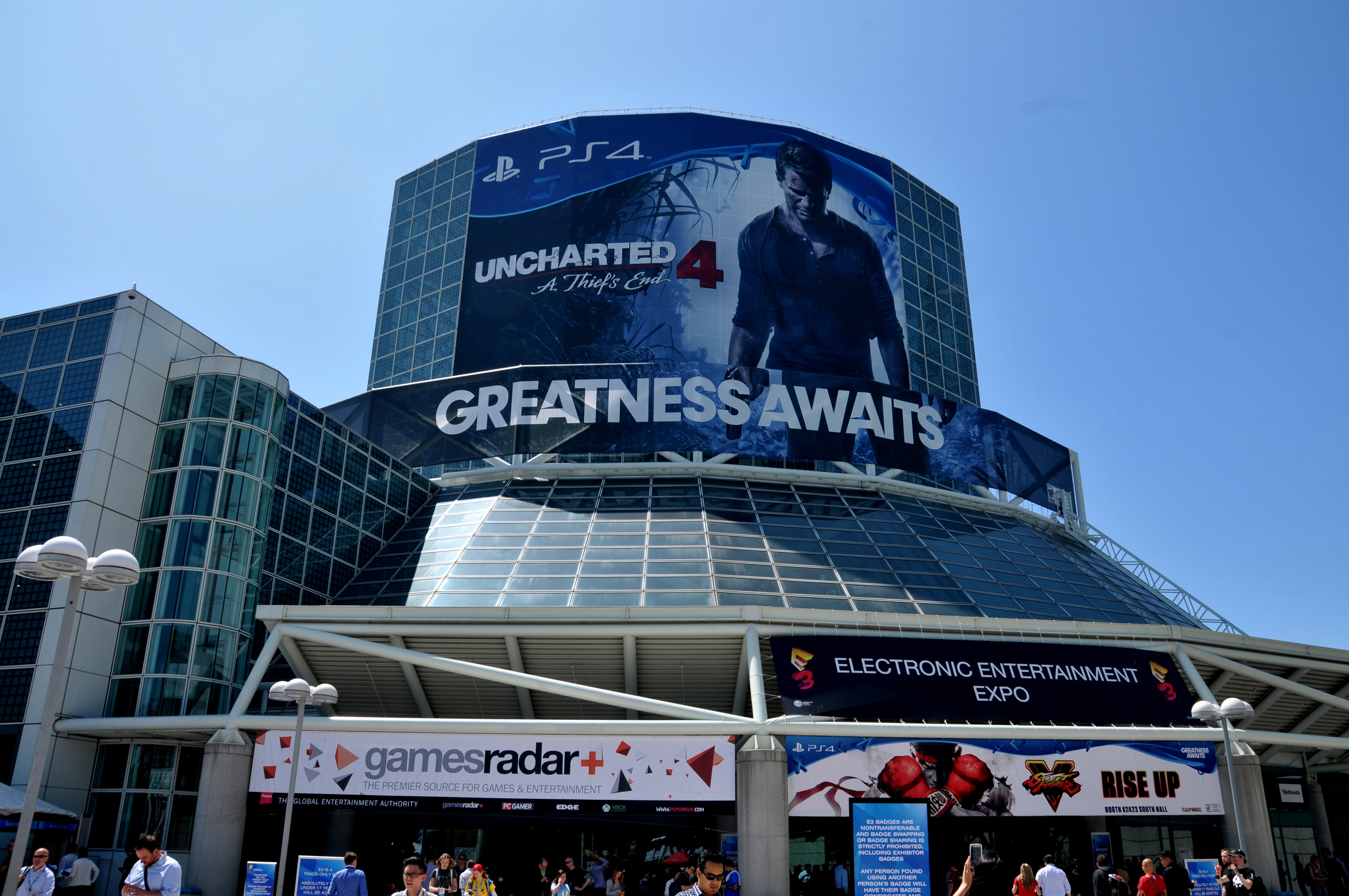
E3 2015 with Uncharted 4: A Thief's End banner

Starting in 2013, some of the major video game companies, particularly Nintendo and Electronic Arts, have opted not to showcase at E3. In Nintendo's case, they have foregone a large keynote presentation and instead have used pre-recorded Nintendo Direct and live video events during the E3 week since 2013 to showcase their new products, though they still run floor booths for hands-on demonstrations. Since 2014, there also have been Nintendo Treehouse Live streams that focused on several different games as well as tournaments for different titles. Electronic Arts, since 2016, have set up a separate EA Play event in a nearby locale to announce and exhibit their titles, citing the move as a result of the lack of public access to the main E3 show. Other vendors, like Microsoft and Sony have used pre-E3 events to showcase hardware reveals, leaving the E3 event to cover new games for these systems.

By 2015, traditional video game marketing had been augmented by the use of publicity through word-of-mouth by average gamers, persons not normally part of the "professional" development community. The ESA began to seek ways to allow these people to attend E3 in limited numbers without overwhelming the normal attendees. For E3 2015, 5,000 tickets were distributed to vendors to be given to fans to be able to attend the event. That same year also marked the introduction of the "PC Gaming Show", featuring games for personal computers across a range of developers and publishers.

=== 2016–2019: Opening to the public ===
E3 2016 featured a separate but free "E3 Live" event at the nearby L.A. Live space that was to help provide a small-scale version of the E3 experience. While it drew about 20,000 people, it was found to be underwhelming. In 2017, the ESA reserved 15,000 tickets to the convention for members of the public to buy; these were all sold, leading to more than 68,000 attendees during E3 2017, which led to noticeable crowding and floor management issues. ESA confirmed that E3 2018 would include public passes, but that for two of the days, the event would be open only to industry attendees for three hours prior to admitting the public.

The ESA unveiled the new logo for E3, replacing its previous one using three-dimensional block letters with a flatter, stylized graphic, in October 2017.

While the ESA has the Convention Center space reserved through 2019, ESA's CEO Mike Gallagher said, following the 2017 event, that they were considering other options due to lack of modernization and upgrades that the center has had to make the space more appropriate for their needs. Gallagher said that the ESA was working with the City and Anschutz Entertainment Group (AEG) which owns the Los Angeles Convention Center and the space around it, with plans to have nearly 500,000 sq ft (46,000 m^{2}) of additional exhibition space added by 2020, but that they would judge this in the 2018 show. During 2018, the event drew 69,200 attendees, the largest since 2005.

With announcements of the dates for E3 2019, the ESA declined to state where they had planned to hold the 2020 event. Sony Interactive Entertainment had announced that it would not be participating in E3 2019, having had participated in every E3 since its launch. Sony stated that they "are exploring new and familiar ways to engage our community in 2019". Sony's CEO Shawn Layden stated in a February 2019 interview that with changes in retailer procurement, their own switch to fewer but more quality titles, and the rapid spread of news via the Internet that having a trade show as late as June is no longer helpful, and that Sony had to create its own Destination PlayStation experience in February as to secure retailer sales. Industry analyst Michael Pachter, speaking to GamingBolt, said, "I think it's a mistake to skip the show, they will probably be there without a big booth. It was a surprise to me".

As of 2016, revenues from running E3 accounted for about 48% of the organization's annual budget, with another 37% coming from membership dues. With Sony's withdrawal from the conference and the controversies surrounding outgoing ESA president Mike Gallagher, some member companies criticized the ESA for splitting its focus between producing E3 and acting as a legislative advocacy group, with neither focus receiving adequate attention. This led to calls advocating for the business of running E3 to be split out into a separate company. Developers and publishers complained of the increasing cost to have a booth presence at E3 compared to simply holding a digital event streamed online, saying the exposure afforded by E3 was not always worth the price. Sony and Electronic Arts' departure and Nintendo's move to a digital-only keynote diminished E3's status as the premier game announcement event, which further eroded its ability to attract exhibitors. E3 lost nearly 1/3 of its exhibitors between 2017 and 2019, going from 293 to 209.

==== Data leak ====
On August 3, 2019, it was found that an unsecured list of personal attendee data was publicly accessible from the ESA's site. The list contained the information of over 2,000 people, most of them being the press and social media influencers that had attended E3 2019. ESA removed the list after it was found, and apologized for allowing the information to become public. However, using similar techniques to access the 2019 data, users found similar data for over 6,000 attendees of past E3 events still available on user-authenticated portions of their website; these too were subsequently pulled by the ESA once notified. A number of journalists on the lists reported that they were subsequently harassed and had received death threats due to their private information being released as part of the leak. Ahead of E3 2020, the ESA stated they were taking stricter security measures to protect the privacy of those registering for E3 as a result of the leak. ESA president Stanley Pierre-Louis stated they plan to collect less data from attendees and take measures such as securing the data on separate servers to avoid this type of leak from occurring again.

=== 2020–2023: Impact of COVID-19 and discontinuation ===
During the last day of the event in 2019, it was confirmed that E3 would be held at the LACC for at least another year, with the 2020 edition. The ESA affirmed they had renegotiated use of the LACC through 2023, but retained the rights to break that contract if desired.

The ESA's membership approved an increase in the number of public passes from 15,000 to 25,000 for the 2020 show. Alongside this, the ESA had presented proposed, but not finalized, plans to make the 2020 event a "fan, media, and influencer festival". To mitigate the longer lines caused by increased public attendance, they aimed to use "queuetainment" to advertise to attendees while they wait, as well as a FastPass-like system of reserving game demos in advance similar to the one employed by Disney Parks. They planned to give priority to "influencers" by providing them appointment-only presentations on new games. Additionally, with these changes, the ESA were considering adding an extra day on the Tuesday of the convention week that would be an industry-only day before the floor of the convention was opened to public passes. Sony affirmed it would not attend the 2020 show, stating that the vision for E3 2020 did not meet their goals, and instead would showcase their games at other events throughout the year. In the wake of Sony's announcement, ESA affirmed that the 2020 show "will be an exciting, high-energy show featuring new experiences, partners, exhibitor spaces, activations, and programming that will entertain new and veteran attendees alike". On February 12, 2020, Geoff Keighley, host of E3 Coliseum and The Game Awards, released a statement announcing that he would also be forgoing his attendance of E3 for the first time in the expo's 25-year history, citing his discomfort with the direction planned for the event in 2020.

However, in the months leading to the 2020 event, the COVID-19 pandemic created concerns related to large gatherings such as E3. As late as March 4, 2020, the ESA had still intended to hold E3 2020, though said they were monitoring the situation around the outbreak. On March 11, 2020, the ESA announced that E3 2020 had been cancelled due to the pandemic. The ESA also claimed that they would both fully refund prospective attendees and exhibitors and devise a virtual event that would enable exhibitors to hold digital presentations during the same week in lieu of a physical meeting. However, by April 7, 2020, the ESA stated that the disruption caused by the pandemic made it impossible to host an online equivalent, fully cancelling the event, though the ESA would help its partners to present individual announcements via E3's website. Keighley would organize Summer Game Fest—an event series encompassing various publisher-led digital presentations and demo offerings from May to August 2020.

Despite cancelling the 2020 event, the ESA stated it still planned to hold the 2021 event, announcing its normal June dates to partners in April 2020. While the ESA had planned for a combined in-person and virtual event, the organization notified its partners in February 2021 that it was dropping the in-person event but maintaining the virtual event plans. According to Video Games Chronicle, the ESA still planned to use the LACC to broadcast some of these virtual events during E3 2021, as well as planning on further use of the space in 2022 and 2023. The virtual event faced a mixed reception among users and the industry, including issues with the event's official mobile app, and assessments that E3 as a virtual event was redundant to streaming presentations that could be held as standalone events by publishers.

While Mayor Eric Garcetti stated that the ESA had planned E3 2022 to be an in-person event, on January 7, 2022, the ESA announced that the in-person version of E3 2022 had been cancelled due to COVID-19, with no immediate confirmation of a virtual event. Although this announcement came amid spread of the Omicron variant, IGN reported that unlike past years, E3 2022 had no dates publicized by either the ESA or the LACC—which had cast doubt (especially amid the internal issues surrounding the 2020 event, and the aforementioned reception to E3 2021) over whether the event was even being planned at all. Furthermore, IGN reported via anonymous sources that the ESA had made a decision to cancel the event as early as late-2021. The ESA formally announced on March 31, 2022, that they had fully cancelled E3 2022.

In June 2022, the ESA stated that they still planned to return with a physical and virtual show in 2023. One month later, the ESA confirmed that E3 2023 would occur at the Los Angeles Convention Center during the second week of June 2023, and that they have partnered with ReedPop, who operate conventions such as PAX events, New York Comic Con, and the Star Wars Celebration, to help manage the event. In September 2022, the ESA announced that the event would also include three "Business Days" where the floor would be limited to developers, publishers, retailers, and recognized journalists, while two days at a separate location would be held as "Fan Days" for all members of the public. In January 2023, IGN reported that none of Microsoft, Nintendo, or Sony would exhibit at E3 2023, with Nintendo confirming their absence the following month, citing that "this year's E3 show didn't fit into our plans." Microsoft confirmed in March 2023 they would not be on the E3 showfloor, but would be holding the digital events. In the same month, Ubisoft also announced that they would not be attending E3 2023, and would be hosting their own presentation event in June instead. On March 29, IGN reported that both Sega and Tencent would be skipping E3 2023.

On March 30, 2023, the 2023 event was cancelled because of a lack of "sustained interest". According to ESA's president, Stanley Pierre-Louis, the choice to cancel the 2023 show was a result of three factors: that the COVID-19 pandemic had impacted the typical development cycle for most companies; that the current economy had publishers and developers re-evaluate the need for attending E3; and that, as a result, there has been more exploration of the mix of in-person and digital marketing events that individual companies have run. While Pierre-Louis stated that ESA was intending to hold E3 in 2024, they were looking themselves to find a balance that works for the industry.

The ESA affirmed in September 2023 that there would be no E3 2024, that they would not be using the LACC in the immediate future, and that ReedPop was no longer working to help organize future events. The ESA stated they were still in discussions with their partners on E3 2025 and future shows, with the former reportedly planned to have a "complete reinvention". On December 12, 2023, the ESA announced that E3 would be permanently discontinued, citing "the new opportunities our industry has to reach fans and partners". Pierre-Louis said that other live events were not responsible for the decision to end E3, while the increasing number of standalone publisher-specific showcases was a reason. He further stated that ReedPop's departure was not solely responsible for their decision to end E3 but helped to inform their choice.

== Events ==
Overview of E3 events
Event name	Dates	Venue(s)	Location	Attendance	Presenters	Notes
E3 1995	May 11–13, 1995	Los Angeles Convention Center	Los Angeles, California	50,000	3DO, Atari, Microsoft, Nintendo, Sega, Sony, SNK	Debut show.
E3 1996	May 16–18, 1996	Los Angeles Convention Center	Los Angeles, California	57,795	Nintendo, Sega, Scavenger, Inc., Sony	
E3 1997	June 19–21, 1997	Georgia World Congress Center, Georgia Dome	Atlanta, Georgia	37,000	Nintendo, Sega, Sony	Moved to Atlanta due to inability to secure LA Convention Center.
E3 1998	May 28–30, 1998	Georgia World Congress Center, Georgia Dome	Atlanta, Georgia	41,300	Nintendo, Sega, Sony	
E3 1999	May 13–15, 1999	Los Angeles Convention Center	Los Angeles, California	55,000	Nintendo, Sega, Sony	
E3 2000	May 11–13, 2000	Los Angeles Convention Center	Los Angeles, California	45,000	Microsoft, Nintendo, Sega, Sony	
E3 2001	May 17–19, 2001	Los Angeles Convention Center	Los Angeles, California	62,000	Microsoft, Nintendo, Sega, Sony	
E3 2002	May 22–24, 2002	Los Angeles Convention Center	Los Angeles, California	—N/a	Microsoft, Nintendo, Sony, Ubisoft	
E3 2003	May 14–16, 2003	Los Angeles Convention Center	Los Angeles, California	60,000	Microsoft, Nintendo, Sony, Ubisoft	
E3 2004	May 11–14, 2004	Los Angeles Convention Center	Los Angeles, California	65,000	Microsoft, Nintendo, Sony, Ubisoft	
E3 2005	May 18–20, 2005	Los Angeles Convention Center	Los Angeles, California	70,000	Microsoft, Nintendo, Sony, Ubisoft	Highest E3 attendance record.
E3 2006	May 10–12, 2006	Los Angeles Convention Center	Los Angeles, California	60,000	Microsoft, Nintendo, Sony, Ubisoft	
E3 2007	July 11–13, 2007	Santa Monica Airport	Santa Monica, California	10,000	Microsoft, Nintendo, Sony, Ubisoft	Branded as the E3 Media and Business Summit. More limited space to reduce public participation focused more on media and retailer attendees. Second-lowest E3 attendance record.
E3 2008	July 15–17, 2008	Los Angeles Convention Center	Los Angeles, California	5,000	Microsoft, Nintendo, Sony, Ubisoft	Lowest E3 attendance record.
E3 2009	June 2–4, 2009	Los Angeles Convention Center	Los Angeles, California	35,000	Microsoft, Nintendo, Sony, Ubisoft	Return to original format and E3 branding, allowing additional game development professions access in addition to media and retailers.
E3 2010	June 14–17, 2010	Los Angeles Convention Center	Los Angeles, California	45,600	Electronic Arts, Konami, Microsoft, Nintendo, Sony, Ubisoft	
E3 2011	June 7–9, 2011	Los Angeles Convention Center	Los Angeles, California	46,000	Electronic Arts, Konami, Microsoft, Nintendo, Sony, Ubisoft	
E3 2012	June 5–7, 2012	Los Angeles Convention Center	Los Angeles, California	45,700	Electronic Arts, Konami, Microsoft, Nintendo, Sony, Ubisoft	
E3 2013	June 11–13, 2013	Los Angeles Convention Center	Los Angeles, California	48,200	Electronic Arts, Konami, Microsoft, Nintendo, Sony, Ubisoft	From this year until its discontinuation, Nintendo used pre-recorded video presentations instead of a press conference, but maintained exhibitor presence on the show floor.
E3 2014	June 10–12, 2014	Los Angeles Convention Center	Los Angeles, California	48,900	Electronic Arts, Microsoft, Nintendo, Sony, Ubisoft	First show open to children 12 and under, along with a guardian. Nintendo had the Nintendo Kids Corner E3 2014 panel, which was mostly open to YouTubers.
E3 2015	June 16–18, 2015	Los Angeles Convention Center	Los Angeles, California	52,200	Bethesda Softworks, Electronic Arts, Microsoft, Nintendo, Oculus VR, Sony, Square Enix, Ubisoft	Introduction of the "PC Gaming Show", featuring games for personal computers across a range of developers and publishers. From this year until 2019, Bethesda Softworks held its own annual conference.
E3 2016	June 14–16, 2016	Los Angeles Convention Center	Los Angeles, California	50,300	Bethesda Softworks, Kadokawa Games, Microsoft, Nintendo, Sony, Square Enix, Ubisoft	From this year until its discontinuation, Electronic Arts did not present at the convention center but at a separate "EA Play" event in Los Angeles prior to the start of E3.
E3 2017	June 13–15, 2017	Los Angeles Convention Center	Los Angeles, California	68,400	Bethesda Softworks, Devolver Digital, Intel, Microsoft, Nintendo, Sony, Ubisoft	First show open to public, with 15,000 public passes sold.
E3 2018	June 12–14, 2018	Los Angeles Convention Center	Los Angeles, California	69,200	Atlus, Bethesda Softworks, Devolver Digital, Electronic Arts, Microsoft, Nintendo, Sega, Sony, Square Enix, Ubisoft	Second-highest E3 attendance record.
E3 2019	June 11–13, 2019	Los Angeles Convention Center	Los Angeles, California	66,100	Bethesda Softworks, Devolver Digital, Microsoft, Nintendo, Square Enix, Ubisoft	From this year until its discontinuation, Sony opted not to participate in E3, the first time since the event's launch; Sony opted to use other video game expos and recorded videos throughout the year to promote their products. Final in-person event held before discontinuation.
E3 2020	Cancelled				Planned: Bandai Namco Entertainment, Bethesda Softworks, Capcom, Devolver Digital, Microsoft, Nintendo, Sega, Square Enix, Take-Two Interactive, Ubisoft, Warner Bros. Interactive Entertainment	Planned to take place from June 9–11, 2020 at the Los Angeles Convention Center. Cancelled due to concerns regarding the COVID-19 pandemic. Public passes were planned to be increased to 25,000.
E3 2021	June 12–15, 2021	Online		—N/a	Bandai Namco Entertainment, Capcom, Gearbox Software, Koch Media, Microsoft, Nintendo, Square Enix, Sega, Take-Two Interactive, Turtle Beach, Ubisoft, Verizon, Warner Bros. Interactive Entertainment, Xseed Games	Online event due to the COVID-19 pandemic. Branded as the "Electronic Entertainment Experience" due to its online nature. Final event held before discontinuation.
E3 2022	Cancelled					Cancelled due to the COVID-19 pandemic, including the online event.
E3 2023	Cancelled					Planned to take place from June 13–16, 2023 at the Los Angeles Convention Center. Cancelled due to lack of interest and attendance of major publishers. ReedPop would have helped organize a new format.

== See also ==
- Brasil Game Show
- Game Developers Conference
- Gamercom
- Gamescom
- List of gaming conventions
- Summer Game Fest
- Tokyo Game Show
- PAX
- ChinaJoy
