= Ghost in the Sheet =

2007 video game

- Developer: CBE Software
- Publisher: Tri Synergy
- Director: Jan Kavan
- Designer: Jan Kavan
- Writers: Jan Kavan, Lukáš Medek
- Engine: Wintermute Engine
- Platform: Windows
- Release: 20 November 2007
- Genre: Adventure game
- Mode: Single-player

Ghost in the Sheet is a 2007 first-person point-and-click adventure game developed by Cardboard Box Entertainment and released in Germany as S.C.A.R.E.

== Development ==
The game was created by two young developers from the Czech Republic - Jan Kavan and Lukas Medek. It was originally planned as a freeware title but feedback from the adventure game community was very positive which led to the decision of releasing it as a commercial game. It was published by Tri Synergy.

== Gameplay ==
The game is a point-and-click adventure game seen from a first-person point of view. To interact with physical objects the player uses the power of telekinesis. During the game the player learns other psychical abilities that help him solve multiple puzzles. There are also arcade-style mini games like smashing rats with bricks.

== Plot ==
The game is a paranormal horror comedy adventure and follows a dead man who becomes a ghost forced to wear a sheet and work for an agency investigating paranormal activity in the mortal world. He is sent to the abandoned Sector Omega factory where he meets ghosts of its former inhabitants and investigates what happened.

As the investigation progresses the protagonist becomes suspicious about his boss, who realizes it and sends his servant Oozy to eliminate him but a hungry monster eats Oozy Saving Ghost in the Sheet's life when Ghost in the Sheet lures Oozy towards the Cellar. The worker then pacifies the local souls, confronts his boss and defeats him.

== Reception ==
The games has received mixed to lightly positive reviews. The game currently holds 60% on Metacritic, 66.29% on GameRankings.

The most positive review was published by GameVortex where Ghost in the Sheet scored 82%. It noted that game "has its issues, but it is still an interesting offering, especially coming from a new company. Most of the issues are mainly polish issues, but the core gameplay is solid enough that it is worth a go if the premise interests you enough."

Another positive review came from GameZebo where it scored 80%. The review praised the voice acting, music and graphics. Another praise was gained for story which was found interesting and lengthy. On the other hand, the game was criticised for its minigames, pixel hunting and system of moving between rooms.

The game was also awarded by Editors' Choice Award on server Computer Times.

Other reviews include GameSpot with 60%. It praised the plot and puzzles but criticised "poor production values, [that] it's easy to get lost in dark areas, [and that] gameplay doesn't really take advantage of [the] supernatural theme".

In the Czech Republic where developers come from the game has received generally negative reviews. The average score was 45.5%.

The most negative review came from server Games.cz. The game scored 30%. The reviewer noted that 20% was gained for originality and 10% for enthusiasm of developers.
