= Tokyo Game Show =

Video game convention

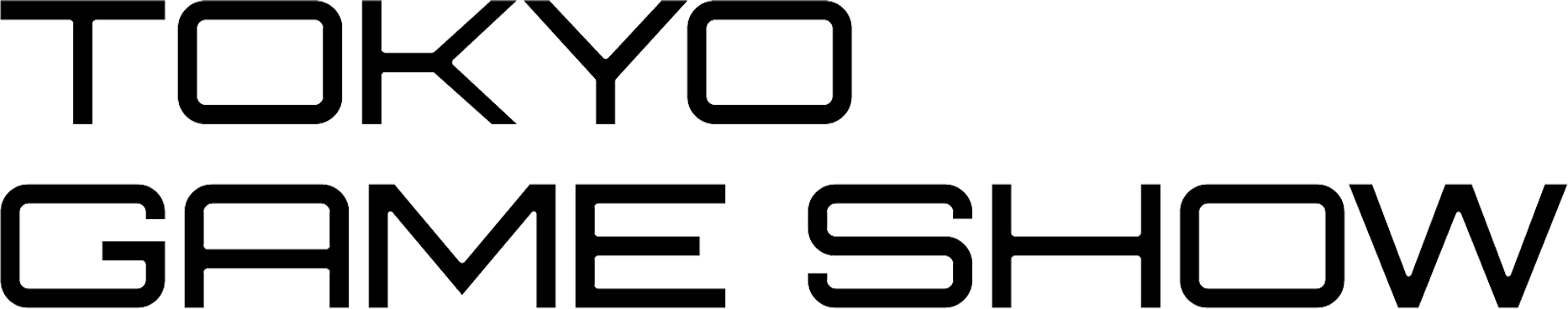
- Logo variations used at Tokyo Game Show from 2021 to 2024
- Status: Active
- Genre: Video games
- Venue: Makuhari Messe
- Location: Chiba
- Country: Japan
- Inaugurated: August 22, 1996; 30 years ago
- Most recent: September 17, 2026; 59 days ago
- Next event: TBA
- Attendance: ▼263,101 (2025)
- Organizer: Computer Entertainment Supplier's Association (CESA); Nikkei Business Publications, Inc.
- Sponsor: Ministry of Economy, Trade and Industry (METI)
- Website: events.nikkeibp.co.jp/tgs/2026

Tokyo Game Show (東京ゲームショウ, Tōkyō Gēmu Shō), commonly known as TGS, is a video game trade fair and convention held annually in September in the Makuhari Messe, in Chiba, Japan. It is presented by the Computer Entertainment Supplier's Association (CESA) and Nikkei Business Publications, Inc. The main focus of the show is on Japanese games, but some international video game developers use it to showcase upcoming releases/related hardware. The duration of the event is four days. The first two days of Tokyo Game Show are open only to industry attendees (business) and the general public can attend during the final two days.

== History ==
The first Tokyo Game Show was held in 1996. From 1996 to 2001, the show was held twice a year: once in the Spring and once in Autumn (in the Tokyo Big Sight). Since 2002, the show has been held once a year. 2011's show hosted over 200,000 attendees and the 2012 show bringing in 223,753. The busiest TGS was in 2016 with 271,224 people in attendance and 614 companies had exhibits. The event has been held annually since 1996 and was never canceled, however the 2020 and 2021 editions were online only as a result of the COVID-19 pandemic. The 2022 edition returned to in-person exhibits. The 20th anniversary of TGS was celebrated in 2016. The 2016 attendance record was topped by 2018's attendance of 298,690 people.

The 2026 edition marked the show's 30^{th} anniversary, with an expanded format including international exhibitors and those from other industries totaling 1,138 unique exhibitors from 53 countries, a record for each.

== Layout ==
The TGS layout varies per year. Such as in 2015, Tokyo Game Show showcased eleven exhibition areas consisting of business, general public, education and other areas to buy merchandise.

=== General Exhibition ===
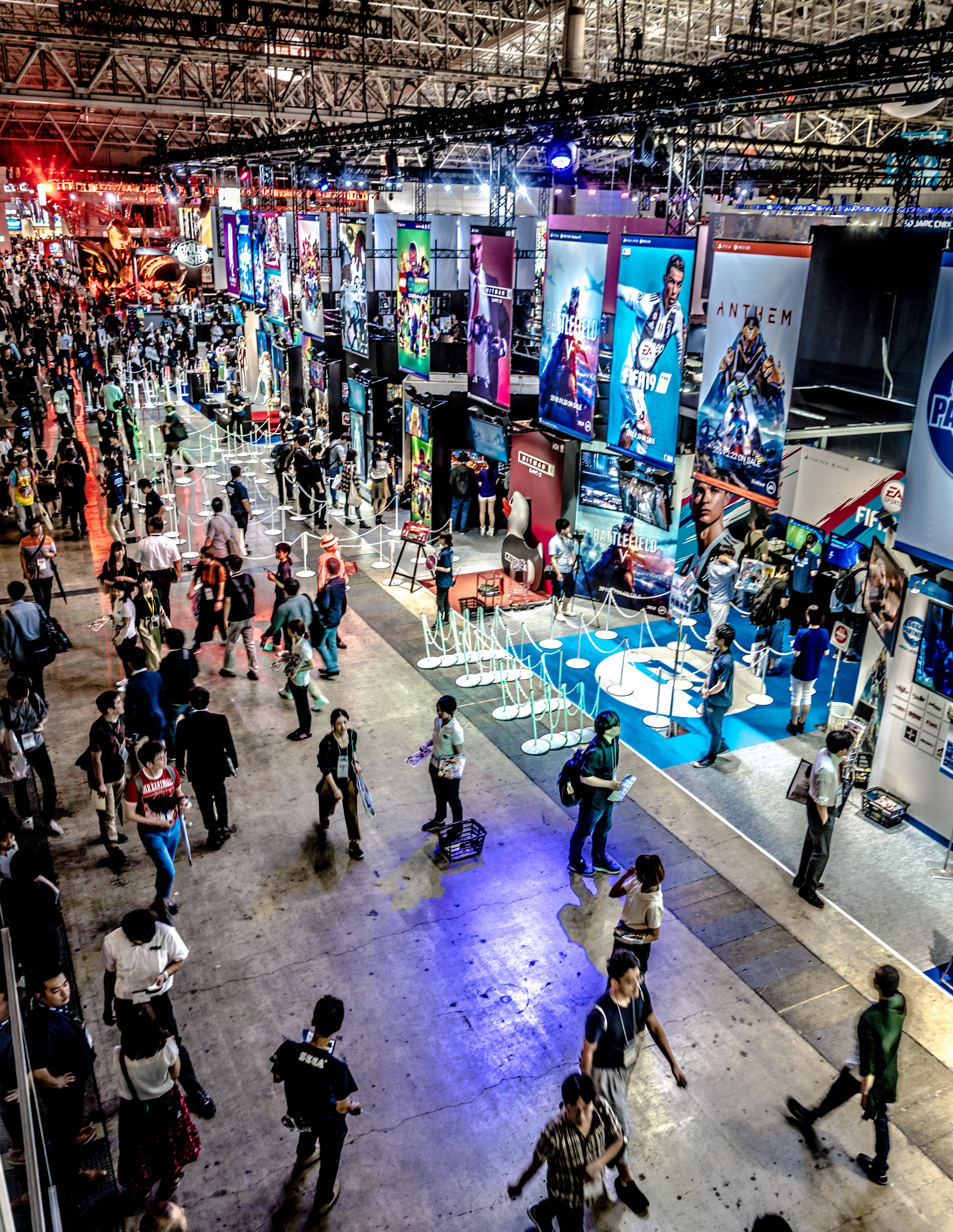
A part of the General Exhibition Area at TGS 2018

The General Exhibition Area is the heart of the show, taking up the largest amount of space, and is held where digital gaming entertainment or any related products or services are showcased. Many well-known companies such as Bandai Namco Entertainment, Capcom, Sony Interactive Entertainment and Square Enix have demo areas here, in addition to emerging companies.

=== Game Device ===
This area covers gaming devices such as headphones, controllers, furniture and other devices associated with home-use gaming consoles and portable gaming devices.

=== Asia New Stars ===
An exhibition introduced at the 2012 Tokyo Game Show is geared towards introducing emerging game developers from Asia.

=== Merchandise Sales ===
This area is designated for merchandising of game-related goods. Vendors include Konami and Square-Enix.

=== Smartphone and social games ===
This area focuses on games for smart devices (smartphones and tablets) and social games. Despite record numbers during TGS 2012, many large companies had a smaller presence. For example, Microsoft, which previously had one of the largest booths, was absent in 2012. Social and mobile gaming surged, filling the gap. Microsoft returned to the show in 2013 with the release of the Xbox One.

=== Personal computing ===
The PC area houses major Japanese computing companies, showcasing products such as Japanese desktop and notebook computers.

=== Children ===
This area showcases new games that are aimed at a younger audience. Companies such as Taito and Sega are housed there.

=== Game school ===
The Game School area showcases information on Japanese universities and colleges offering information about digital art, animation, computer programming, and other programs of study related to the video game industry. These booths also display student work. It houses colleges such as Numazu Professional College of Information Technology and Tokyo Designer Gakuin College.

=== Sales ===
This is the main area in the games convention where most of the sales and business transactions between companies and consumers are carried out. Companies housed there include Nikkei Business Publications.

=== Cosplay ===
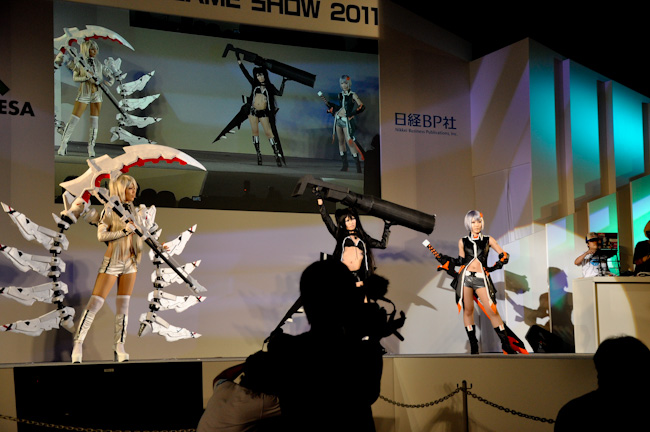
Cosplay Collection Night at TGS 2011

The Tokyo Game Show attracts many cosplayers. Cure, Japan's largest cosplay community website, hosts Cosplay Collection Night, a parade in stage show with more than 100 cosplayers on Saturday's night. The show starts from 6:30pm until 8 pm and it is hosted by Yunmao Ayakawa and Tatsumi Inui from the production team company CURE World Cosplay, with background music by DJ & MC: WAN. The participants are members of Worldcosplay website with a few international cosplayers who won contests in countries like Spain, Philippines, South Korea, Singapore, Indonesia, Turkey, the US, and China and others.

=== Business solutions ===
This is the main business area and is not open to the public.

=== Cloud/data center pavilion ===
The Cloud/Data Center is dedicated to improving infrastructure and environment of social and network games.

=== Street Fighter tournaments ===
The Tokyo Game Show has featured a Mad Catz-sponsored Street Fighter tournament since 2014. The competition is part of Capcom's official Pro Tour, making it a qualifying event for the Capcom Cup. The 2016 event was the first to not be sponsored by Mad Catz, as the company got in severe financial trouble during its 2016 fiscal year.

== Sense of Wonder Night ==
Sense of Wonder Night (SOWN) is a presentation session held yearly at the TGS for showcasing innovative and experimental computer games mainly made by small game studios and independent game developers from all over the world, similar to and inspired by the GDC Experimental Gameplay Workshop. The first edition was held in 2008. Among former and current judges are Keita Takahashi and Simon Carless.

== See also ==
- Asia Game Show
- Brasil Game Show
- Gamescom
- Electronic Entertainment Expo (E3)
- Gamercom
- Game Developers Conference
