= J.U.L.I.A. =

2012 video game

- Developer: CBE Software
- Publisher: Lace International (under the Lace Mamba Global name)
- Engine: Wintermute Engine
- Platforms: Windows; OS X Linux
- Release: 2 March 2012
- Genres: Adventure, puzzle
- Mode: Single-player

J.U.L.I.A. is a 2012 indie video game developed by CBE Software. It is an adventure game with a heavy emphasis on puzzles, mini-games and menu-based interfaces. The game is set in 2430 when a scientific expedition is sent to a distant star system.

== Story ==
The game centers on three characters – Astrobiologist Rachel Manners, the ship's artificially intelligent computer J.U.L.I.A. and a remote-controlled landing craft MOBOT. Rachel is awakened by J.U.L.I.A. from cryogenic sleep and finds out that other members of the expedition are dead. She starts to investigate what happened. It takes her all over the Solar System. She is helped by MOBOT who provides an exploration on planets and by J.U.L.I.A. who helps her with multiple puzzles.

== Reception ==
The game received mixed reviews from critics who praised the story, puzzles, graphics and music, but criticized its gameplay, which many found boring.

The game earned two Aggie Awards nominations in 2012. It was nominated in category for the best character (for character of MOBOT) and the best gameplay.

== Related games ==
A spin-off game, J.U.L.I.A. Untold, was later released. The game starts with discovering a partially destroyed backup database.

Developers later started to work on J.U.L.I.A. Among the Stars. It was originally planned to be the Enhanced Edition of the game but thanks to success on Indiegogo, it became a remake with much different gameplay and story. The release date was 12 October 2014.
