= Alpha Polaris =

2011 video game

- Windows box art
- Developer: Turmoil Games
- Publisher: Just a Game
- Engine: Wintermute Engine
- Platform: Microsoft Windows
- Release: WW: June 24, 2011
- Genres: Point-and-click adventure, horror
- Mode: Single-player

Alpha Polaris is a point-and-click horror adventure game, developed by Finnish company Turmoil Games and published by Just a Game. It was released for Microsoft Windows on June 24, 2011. The game is set in a research station in Greenland.

== Story ==
Screenshot

Rune Knudsen is a Norwegian biologist and the protagonist living at the American exploratory oil facility/research station Alpha Polaris in Greenland. Among the crew is Al Schaumann, the leader of the station, Tully Crean, a coarse and somewhat obnoxious handyman, Alistair Euler, the arrogant son of the company's CEO who arrives for a sudden unscheduled inspection and Nova whom Rune has romantic feelings for.

Al finds a crevasse with a cave on the walls. Inside the cave he finds something that resembles human bones and an aged parchment showing dark images and strange pictographs. During the nights, the ion storm of the century is gathering and the crew starts to experience horrible night terrors, causing them to go increasingly anxious and insane with paranoia. Soon, Rune investigates the bones and the cave discovering that there might have been an ancient renegade tribe who committed cannibalism and worshiped a vicious entity known as the Wendigo.

Soon, things escalate drastically as Tully commits suicide, Alistair becomes insane with paranoia believing that Rune killed Nova and Al is possessed to build a grotesque effigy made out animal bones and human body parts and plans to sacrifice Nova in order to release the Wendigo from beyond the aurora rift. Rune manages to stop the ritual, leaving only him and Nova as the last survivors. They drive off to Thule past a polar bear who looks at them curiously, revealing that the Wendigo's evil has truly been vanquished.

== Gameplay ==
Alpha Polaris is a 2.5D point-and-click adventure. Geometrically modeled 3D characters act in front of pre-rendered backgrounds. The game world is divided into individual game screens through which the player can navigate using the mouse. Also with the mouse the player can interact with the gameworld, examine its elements, pick up objects and apply them to elements of the game world or other objects and interact with NPCs. Conversations with NPCs take place as multiple choice dialogues.

== Development ==
Alpha Polaris was developed using the Wintermute game engine.
