= Carol Reed Mysteries =

- Genre: Detective adventure
- Developer: MDNA Games
- First release: 2004

The Carol Reed Mysteries is a detective adventure video game series developed by MDNA Games. The series consists of 21 games to date. The latest game, The Final Chapter, was released on January 1, 2026.

== Plot ==
The games follow the adventures of female detective Carol Reed.

== Gameplay ==
Carol Reed is a graphical adventure game series that has the player navigating photographs of backgrounds and people. They interact with characters and manipulate items to progress through the stories.

== Games ==
Number	Name	Year	Engine
1	Remedy	2004	Adventure Maker
2	Hope Springs Eternal	2005	Adventure Maker
3	Time Stand Still	2006	Adventure Maker
4	East Side Story	2007	Wintermute Engine
5	The Colour of Murder	2008	Wintermute Engine
6	Black Circle	2009	Wintermute Engine
7	Blue Madonna	2011	Wintermute Engine
8	Amber's Blood	2012	Wintermute Engine
9	Cold Case Summer	2013	Wintermute Engine
10	Bosch's Damnation	2014	Wintermute Engine
11	Shades Of Black	2015	Wintermute Engine
12	Profound Red	2017	Wintermute Engine
13	The Birdwatcher	2018	Wintermute Engine
14	The Fall of April	2019	Wintermute Engine
15	Geospots	2020	Wintermute Engine
16	Quarantine Diary	2021	Wintermute Engine
17	Amos Green's Final Repose	2022	Godot - EgoVenture framework
18	The Game Maker	2023	Godot - EgoVenture framework
19	Dead Drop	2024	Godot - EgoVenture framework
20	Murder Malady	2025	Godot - EgoVenture framework
21	The Final Chapter	2026	Godot - EgoVenture framework
22	Gaslight	2027	Godot - EgoVenture framework

== Development ==
=== Conception ===
Mikael Nyqvist and his wife Eleen founded MDNA Games. The first three games are written by Mikael and Eleen, while the rest are written by Mikael. The company is named after the singer Madonna; Mikael had previously run the largest Madonna-themed fan site and has an affinity for her. The name of the female protagonist, Carol Reed, was chosen by Eleen, despite reservations from Mikael that the name was already associated with a male English director. Aspects of the production for each game would include: scripting, planning, location scouting, photographing, and sound recording, while photo retouching (about 40% of the process) and game programming would become the most time consuming, nonetheless, over the years Mikael has received some outside help to do tasks such as building the game's interface which is used as a template for each title. After the first three games together, Eleen has taken on more of a consulting role due to other commitments. Mikael acknowledges that his series and Her Interactive's Nancy Drew video game series share common themes, and are the two longest adventure game series, but explained that he was not inspired by the series when creating the Carol Reed Mysteries.

=== Casting and characters ===
The couple decided to set the games in Sweden, but to have a main character from England; this meant that the Swedish characters would be forced to speak to Carol Reed in English with a Swedish accent, which allowed them to hire friends and acquaintances for a low cost. Mikael does not like talking about how he visualises Carol's appearance, and expressed dismay at the German versions of the first six games having photos of "Carol" on the cover while the Russian versions had drawings of her. Sara Louise Williams, who voices Carol Reed and plays Stina, is the sister of Eleen. According to Mikael, "she was a natural choice for Carol's voice acting, as her English is excellent", having lived in England for ten years. Bjørn Larsen, who plays Jonas, used to be a colleague of Mikael at the Swedish Social Insurance Agency. Bigge is an old friend of Mikael's. Stina is Carol's oldest friend in Sweden. All of the cast members have other careers.

=== Filming ===
Practically all of the games in the series take place in summer. This is because of the challenges of shooting during Swedish winter: too dark, few hours of sunshine, and packed streets. In addition there could be continuity errors created because of weather inconsistency: snow-filled one week and clear the next. Mikael shoots the field surveys early in the morning - starting at 4:00 am - due to the lighting and empty streets. When people unavoidably end up in his photos, he retouches them out. As the same locations are visited multiple times throughout the stories, he thinks it would be strange to the player to see the same character or moving object there at different times or on different days. Set in Mikael's hometown of Norrköping, Sweden, the games use photography and local history of the city as a backdrop." Carol Reed's in-game apartment is Mikael's real life apartment, which he photographed for the game; meanwhile the dacha seen in the game is Eleen's summer holiday house. Sometimes he travels outside of the city. For instance the location of the in-game "Dead City" was an abandoned leper colony in Tenerife, Arico, Spain.

=== Writing ===
For the first few games in the series, Mikael took photos in summer then spent the next 6 months creating the game from the footage. The 2013-released title Cold Case Summer: The ninth Carol Reed Mystery took a post-production of 13 months to complete, and Mikael foresaw future games taking about the same amount of time. He put this down to three things: the games having a larger scope, him taking longer to take the photos, and him being slower to create the games due to his age. In terms of the tone, Mikael commented "Balancing light and dark, good and evil, etc., is no particular problem. That's simply the way life is".

=== Design ===
In regards to the gameplay mechanics, Mikael wanted to keep the interface as simple as possible and not provide a barrier between the player and the gaming experience. This includes simplifying mechanics like saving/loading, accessing the inventory, and mouse clicking hotspots. While the games were originally created using Adventure Maker, Mikael switched to Wintermute Engine for East Side Story: The fourth Carol Reed Mystery and kept using it until Quarantine Diary: The 16th Carol Reed Mystery. In 2021, Nyqvist switched to EgoVenture, a custom framework for first-person point and click adventures co-developed with Dennis Ploeger based on Godot, with its source code released under the MIT License on GitHub. Mikael has made it a design philosophy to not be too ambitious, and only plan things he knows he will be able to pull off. There isn't any blood in the games and he avoids a shock/gore effect; while adventure gamers deem Carol Reed a 'non-bloody detective [series]", Mikael thinks that if the same games had been shot in night time rather than sunny summer days they would have been classified as horror games.

=== Release ===
The games are exclusively available via the MDNA Games website. The team has had various American publishers, but prefers to work without one.

These days, we sell most of our games independently from our own web site. The download links are sent to the email addresses that are connected to the buyers' PayPal account. It's not unusual that people have old email addresses that don't work anymore. So I have lots of experience of tracking down people in various ways.

— Mikael on the challenges of independent publishing, interview with Questtime

== Reception ==
- Remedy - An Adventure Game: The first Carol Reed Mystery (2004)

Just Adventure gave it a B and B+ in two separate reviews. Adventure Classic Gaming gave it a positive review. Adventure Gamers gave it 3/5 stars.

- Hope Springs Eternal: The second Carol Reed Mystery (2005)

Just Adventure gave it a B+ Adventure Classic Gaming gave it a positive review. Adventure Gamers gave it 3/5 stars.

- Time Stand Still: The third Carol Reed Mystery (October 12, 2006)

Adventure Classic Gaming gave it a positive review. Adventure Gamers gave it 3/5 stars.

- East Side Story: The fourth Carol Reed Mystery (2007)

Quandaryland gave it 3.5. Just Adventure gave it an A-/B-. The game has a rating on Mobygames of 73% based on 4 critics. Adventure Classic Gaming gave it a positive review. Adventure Gamers gave it 3/5 stars.

- The Color of Murder: The fifth Carol Reed Mystery (2008)

Gamezebo gave it 3.5/5 stars. Adventure Classic Gaming gave it a positive review. Adventure Gamers gave it 3.5/5 stars.

- Black Circle: The sixth Carol Reed Mystery (2009)

Just Adventure gave it an A−. Adventure Classic Gaming gave it a positive review. Adventure Gamers gave it 3.5/5 stars.

- Blue Madonna: The seventh Carol Reed Mystery (2010)

Gamezebo gave it 2 out of 5 stars. Adventure Classic Gaming gave it a positive review. Adventure Gamers gave it 3/5 stars.

- Amber's Blood: The eighth Carol Reed Mystery (2012)

Adventure Gamers gave it 3.5/5 stars.

- Cold Case Summer: The ninth Carol Reed Mystery (2013)

Adventure Gamers gave it 3.5/5 stars.

- Bosch's Damnation: The 10th Carol Reed Mystery (2014)

Just Adventure gave it a positive review. Adventure Classic Gaming gave it a positive review. Adventure Gamers gave it 3/5 stars.

- Shades of Black: The 11th Carol Reed Mystery (2015)

Just Adventure gave it a B+. Adventure Gamers gave it 3/5 stars.

- Profound Red: The 12th Carol Reed Mystery (2017)

Adventure Gamers gave it 4/5 stars.

- The Birdwatcher: The 13th Carol Reed Mystery (2018)
- The Fall of April: The 14th Carol Reed Mystery (2019)
- Geospots: The 15th Carol Reed Mystery (2020)
- Quarantine Diary: The 16th Carol Reed Mystery (2021)
- Amos Green's Final Repose: The 17th Carol Reed Mystery (2022)
- The Game Maker: The 18th Carol Reed Mystery (2023)
