= Face Noir =

2013 video game

- Developer: Mad Orange
- Publisher: Phoenix Online Studios
- Engine: Wintermute Engine
- Platform: Windows
- Release: July 18, 2013
- Genres: Point-and-click adventure, puzzle
- Mode: Single-player

Face Noir is a point-and-click adventure puzzle video game developed by Italian studio Mad Orange and published by Phoenix Online Studios. It released in July 2013 for Windows.

== Synopsis ==
The player assumes the role of Jack Del Nero, a detective who is falsely accused of killing a man who left a little girl in Jack's protection. Jack must clear his name, figure out who the little girl is, and who murdered the man.

== Development ==
The game was developed by Mad Orange, an Italian studio consisting of Gabriele Papalini and Marco Sgolmin. It was localized by Phoenix Online Studios. Papalini and Sgolmin cited Italian cinema from the 1950s and works from actor Nino Manfredi. The game was released for Windows on October 17, 2013.

== Reception ==
Reception

Aggregate score
Aggregator	Score
Metacritic	59/100

Review scores
Publication	Score
Adventure Gamers	3.5/5
Destructoid	5/10
Hardcore Gamer	2.5/5
RPG Gamer	85%

Face Noir received a 59/100 from review score aggregate Metacritic.
