= The White Chamber =

2005 video game

- Developer: Studio Trophis
- Designer: Richard Perrin
- Programmer: Richard Perrin
- Artist: Paul Johnson
- Composer: Zakir Rahman
- Engine: Wintermute Engine
- Platform: Microsoft Windows
- Release: March 2005
- Genre: Puzzle adventure
- Mode: Single-player

The White Chamber (stylized as the white chamber) is a science fiction horror game created by Studio Trophis. Originally designed as a university project, it was expanded to a full game and released for Microsoft Windows as free download in 2005.

== Gameplay ==
The game's art is influenced by anime. Dialog is conveyed through text boxes.

The White Chamber is a puzzle adventure game in which the player uses a point-and-click interface to control the protagonist and solve puzzles. The game uses two-dimensional graphics and features an inventory system for managing objects used in puzzle solving.

The story is told through hand-drawn cutscenes, dialog boxes, and voiced dialog. It features a karma system where player actions can influence story outcomes; there are eight possible endings.

== Release history ==
The first release of the game was released for free in 2005. It originally had no voice acting.

The size was one of the contributing factors to the fact that it was originally available exclusively through bittorrent, with the game being over 300 MB. In an article for PC Zone, Richard Perrin stated that using bittorrent allowed them to reduce their bandwidth costs greatly.

The game has been updated multiple times and is now at version 1.7. It features eight endings and the text in nine languages, English, Czech, French, German, Greek, Italian, Polish, Portuguese and Russian and voice acting in either English or German.

The game's source code and assets have been released under the CC BY-NC-SA Creative Commons license. That means anyone is free to share and modify the game as long as Studio Trophis is credited, it is not for commercial gain, and that the result is made available under a similar license ("Freeware"). The game's engine ("Wintermute") source code was later released under the MIT license in 2013 on Bitbucket.

Around 2014 a remastered version was announced for commercial re-release, by Richard Perrin's successor company.

== Related media ==
A prequel audio drama called The Grey Tower was released for free in 2006. It consist of 25 audio files, and takes place months before the events of The White Chamber.

== Reception ==
Reception

Review scores
| Publication | Score |
|---|---|
| JustAdventure | A |
| FreePCGamers | 8/10 |

The game has received very positive critical reactions. The New York Times described it as "Grisly and intriguing, with logical puzzles and surprising plot twists, Chamber is a first-rate garage game." Indie Games Plus included it in their list of top adventure games of 2006.

As of May 2006 the game has been downloaded over 100,000 times and has featured on many magazines across the world (including the UK's best-selling SFX magazine and The New York Times) and appeared often on cover discs.
