= CBE Software =

Czech video game developer

- Company type: Video game developer
- Industry: Video games
- Founded: 2006
- Headquarters: Brno, Czech Republic
- Key people: Jan Kavan; Lukáš Medek
- Website: www.cbe-software.com

CBE Software is an indie video game developer based in the Czech Republic. It was founded in 2006 as Cardboard Box Entertainment (CBE). The first released title was an adventure game titled Ghost in the Sheet. The studio was then inactive for a few years and its members worked on titles such as Dark Fall II: Lights Out, Barrow Hill and Tale of a Hero.

In 2011, the studio was renamed to CBE Software. A year later, it released two games – J.U.L.I.A. and J.U.L.I.A. Untold. These games were exclusively published by Lace Mamba Global who didn't pay them and the publishing agreement was cancelled. The studio came to financial troubles and so released another game titled Vampires!

In March 2013, the Indiegogo for J.U.L.I.A. Among the Stars (originally titled J.U.L.I.A. Enhanced Edition) was launched. The goal was $5,000 but $14,120 was raised. It was released on 12 October 2014. It is a remake of the original J.U.L.I.A. with different gameplay and story.

== Games ==
All games by CBE Software
Title	Year	Platform(s)	Genre	Description
Ghost in the Sheet	2007	Microsoft Windows	Point-and-click adventure	
J.U.L.I.A.	2012	Microsoft Windows, OS X	Puzzle, adventure	
J.U.L.I.A. Untold	2012	iOS, Microsoft Windows, Linux, OS X	Puzzle adventure	A spin-off to J.U.L.I.A. Released in 2012 for IOS. Other versions scheduled for 2014.
Vampires!	2012	Microsoft Windows, OS X, Android	Puzzle	Released for mobile devices as Crazy Vampires and in desktop platforms as Vampires: Lead Them to Safety!
Boredom of Augustín Cordes	2013	Microsoft Windows	Adventure	Described by developers as a freeware boredom simulator.
Serena	2014	Microsoft Windows, OS X, Linux	Adventure	Developed in cooperation with other developer teams.
J.U.L.I.A. Among the Stars	2014	Microsoft Windows, OS X, Linux	Adventure, puzzle	Remake of original J.U.L.I.A.
Someday You'll Return	2020	Microsoft Windows, PlayStation 4, Xbox One	Psychological horror	3D psychological horror game
