= Someday You'll Return =

Someday You'll Return: Director's Cut
- Developer: CBE Software
- Publisher: Bohemia Interactive
- Designers: Jan Kavan; Lukáš Medek
- Programmer: Jan Kavan
- Artist: Lukáš Medek
- Writer: Jan Kavan
- Composer: Jan Kavan
- Engine: Unreal Engine 4
- Platforms: Windows; PlayStation 4 PlayStation 5
- Release: Windows: WW: 5 May 2020; PS4, PS5; 7 March 2023
- Genre: Psychological horror
- Mode: Single-player

Someday You'll Return is a psychological horror video game developed by Czech company CBE Software. The game follows the protagonist Daniel in the search for his daughter in Moravian forests. The game features Czech realities, such as tourist signs, the Czech landscape and natural monuments. It is dubbed in English, with Czech or English subtitles.

On March 7, 2023, the game was released in an enhanced version Someday You'll Return: Director's Cut on the PS4 and PS5 game consoles, the update is free for game owners on PC, subtitles have also been added for Spanish, French, Portuguese, German, Italian, Japanese and Chinese language.

== Gameplay ==
Someday You'll Return is a psychological horror video game played from a first-person perspective. There is no combat in the game, but there are many game mechanics player must use to progress. In some parts of the game there are stealth sequences in which player must sneak around to avoid the danger. Players' decisions and actions have consequences which can influence the ending, it is possible to reach six different endings. Players must also use their wits, a map, and local tourist signs to explore a landscape that is both beautiful and treacherous. The world is full of old memories, abandoned camps, steep hills, gloomy swamps, and collapsed bunkers. It is within these magical forests, inspired by the South Moravian landscape, where stories, riddles, and hidden dangers await.

The game also offers extensive crafting, allowing you to edit, disassemble, and craft new artifacts out of items you collect along your travels in order to advance the story. Included as well are the ancient arts of herbalism and alchemy. This enables players to craft mystical potions that will help them solve difficult puzzles and eventually lead them to uncover the truth about Stela.

== Development ==
The game was developed for five years, uses the Unreal Engine and was released for Windows. The game was first announced in 2015 with by trailer on YouTube. The atmosphere bears a resemblance to the horror Blair Witch Project. According to the developers the game was inspired by Silent Hill 2, Outlast 2, The Vanishing of Ethan Carter and Resident Evil 7: Biohazard. In 2018 the game received Unreal Dev Grant by Epic Games. The game was a commercial failure, which was partly attributed to piracy, as the beta version of the game was leaked prior to its release by one of journalists who received the build for preview. It was estimated by developers that 98% of players played illegal copies. It was released for Windows on 5 May 2020, having been delayed from its original 14 April release date due to the COVID-19 pandemic.

In 2021, Jan Kavan, the founder of CBE Software, approached the co-founder of Bohemia Interactive, Marek Španel, and they agreed that the famous Czech developer of games like Arma 3 or DayZ would help with the project and become the publisher of the improved Someday You'll Return: Director's Cut.

== Plot ==
Someday You'll Return is a story-driven game about the search for Stela, a young girl lost in the surreal forests of South Moravia. Players take on the role of Stela's father Daniel who is forced to return to the forest which he's vowed to stay away from. The game deals with the concepts of fear, lies, and fatherhood, as well as coming to terms with one's past. There are numerous elements of fantasy and horror involved, where it's not always clear what's real and what isn't, or who the actual monster truly is.

The story has been designed to reflect actual locations in the Czech Republic and is steeped in local mythology and traditions. Stela ran to the Chřiby forests. The environment is based on the Cyril and Methodius Trail near Uherské Hradiště, but the area is composed of other samples of places from Moravia, for example, Hradisko of St. Clement, Gorazd's Well, Kozel Rock, Cimburk Castle and Moravian Karst, two places are also from Bohemia: the Cemetery in Hřensko and Pravčická brána.

== Director's Cut ==
Someday You'll Return has received a significant improvement from CBE Software in the form of a Director's Cut. The extended version of the newly improved game is being published by Bohemia Interactive and offers hundreds of improvements and additions to both its content and gameplay.

Director's Cut brought a lot of new features, for example, availability for PlayStation 4 and PlayStation 5 (with haptic control support), significant optimization for smoother gameplay, photo mode, localization into 7 new languages, better scene lighting in many locations, more dynamic gameplay (i.e. fewer "walking" scenes), DLSS support, new interactive tutorial for alchemy and herbalism, new hidden game ending (for New Game+ mode), improved sound system and over 30 minutes of new music, full support for Xbox and PlayStation controllers, and more intense and terrifying scenes.

== Reception ==
Reception

Aggregate score
Aggregator	Score
Metacritic	66/100

Review scores
Publication	Score
Adventure Gamers	4/5
IGN	5/10

According to Metacritic, Someday You'll Return received "mixed or average reviews".

The game was presented at the Croatian Reboot Develop 2018, and the game has won awards in categories the Visual Excellence and Game of the Year. It also received nominations in categories Best Gameplay and Special Selection. At the Moscow White Nights conference, it won award in the Best Art category.
