= Presentable Liberty =

2014 video game

Menagerie II: Presentable Liberty
- Developer: Robert "Wertpol" Brock
- Series: Menagerie
- Engine: GameMaker: Studio
- Platform: Microsoft Windows
- Release: December 26, 2014
- Genre: Psychological horror
- Mode: Single-player

Menagerie II: Presentable Liberty is a 2014 (Note: Some sources erroneously report the game as a 2017 release.) indie psychological horror video game made by Robert "Wertpol" Brock as a part of the Menagerie series. In the game, the player is trapped in a jail cell which (for the majority of the game) they cannot leave. Instead, the player's interaction is mainly limited to reading letters sent to them and playing games to entertain themself.

Presentable Liberty received positive reviews for its story and minimalistic approach to gameplay, and achieved moderate mainstream attention due to let's plays by popular YouTubers Markiplier and Jacksepticeye. The game's plot, involving a deadly virus outbreak, combined with the motif of isolation, was compared by some reviewers to the COVID-19 pandemic, although the game was released many years prior to it.

A remake of Presentable Liberty and the first entry in the Menagerie series, Exoptable Money, was planned, however, three separate Kickstarter campaigns failed to gather sufficient funding, and the remakes ceased development following Brock's death by suicide in 2018.

== Gameplay and plot ==
Presentable Liberty is minimalistic in gameplay and scope, taking place almost entirely in a small jail cell. The player is able to move around their cell and read letters sent through their cell door, which arrive at set times in each in-game day, with no way for the player to make them arrive more quickly, and no way to respond. The letters each come from one of four people: Salvadore, an explorer and friend of the protagonist; Doctor Money, a wealthy organ harvester and the man imprisoning the protagonist; Mr. Smiley, a man hired by Doctor Money to keep the protagonist happy and non-suicidal; and Charlotte, a bakery owner who is presumably the only other person left alive in the city.

Salvadore's letters detail his expedition north, where he watches a river's flow change direction, picks up an interest in wood carving, and eventually returns back to the city. Doctor Money's letters explain that the city is suffering from an epidemic caused by an unnamed virus which has infected 98% of the population, and that the remaining 2% are mainly prison inmates, including the protagonist. Mr. Smiley, the protagonist's assigned "Happy Buddy", tries to keep the protagonist happy with overwhelmingly cheerful dialogue and small gifts, including party poppers, a poster, and video games played on a Game Boy-esque device. Charlotte, fearful of the outside, refuses to leave her shop, her letters lamenting her loneliness and the horrors of the city, having fallen to the virus. Charlotte reveals to the protagonist that although Doctor Money has created an antidote to the virus, it causes organ failure, making functional organs valuable, although the organs being sold are also phony cures themselves.

As the game progresses, each of the letter-writers, aside from Doctor Money, find themselves in increasingly distressing situations. Mr. Smiley, as the player finds out through an erroneously-sent letter, is being blackmailed by Doctor Money by holding his daughters as hostages. When Mr. Smiley's happy façade briefly cracks, Doctor Money sends a letter offering to replace him. Eventually, Mr. Smiley discovers that his daughters are already dead, and he decides to sell all of his organs to be able to buy the protagonist one final video game. When Salvadore eventually returns to the city, he finds it abandoned, and attempts to visit the protagonist and break them out of jail. Charlotte offers to come visit the protagonist, or for the protagonist to visit her, but becomes doubtful that this will ever happen and loses all hope, with her final letter being covered in blood. Doctor Money, meanwhile, reveals that he is the creator of the virus.

The finale of the game is marked with the first meaningful decision that the player can make; as Salvadore enters the protagonist's prison, he finds it lacks stairs nor a functioning elevator, making it impossible for him to reach the protagonist's cell. He decides to try to remotely unlock the player's cell door by sabotaging the building's generator, and succeeds, but is fatally electrocuted in the process. As the door is unlocked, Doctor Money urges the protagonist to stay inside their cell.

If the player disobeys Doctor Money, they will find a discarded panel in a hallway of what appears to be a normal apartment complex surrounding their jail cell. The panel plugs into the wall of the cell, having an up and down arrow, revealing the cell to be the building's elevator. Pressing the down button, the player rapidly descends, eventually reaching ground level. As the player walks outside, they find Charlotte's bakery, where all that remains are bloodstains and a suicide note. After reading it, the game ends.

If the player instead chooses to obey Doctor Money and stay within the cell, the building's generator will restart shortly after, and Doctor Money will be the only person remaining to send the protagonist notes. He explains that the protagonist themselves is the cure to the virus, and he intends to sell their organs at an absurdly high price. After twelve days, the protagonist is greeted by a mysterious figure, presumably Doctor Money himself, and dies, before the game ends.

== Planned remakes ==
Following the positive reception to Presentable Liberty, the game's developer, Robert “Wertpol” Brock, attempted to raise funds for remakes of Presentable Liberty and the first entry in the Menagerie series, Exoptable Money, on Kickstarter. Although successful in getting the remakes accepted on Steam Greenlight, the Kickstarter failed to meet its funding goal. Two subsequent Kickstarters were made, which were both also unsuccessful. Shortly before the third Kickstarter, a spin-off game titled Menagerie: Archive was released. Ultimately, the remakes ceased development, following Brock's suicide in 2018.

A licensed remake of Presentable Liberty is in development, with a portion of proceeds set to be donated to a charity preventing suicide. Originally set to release in 2022, the remake is currently in its Beta stage.
