= J.U.L.I.A. Among the Stars =

2014 video game

- Developer: CBE Software
- Publisher: CBE Software
- Designer: Jan Kavan
- Platforms: Windows, OS X, Linux
- Release: 12 October 2014
- Genres: Adventure game, puzzle video game
- Mode: Single-player

J.U.L.I.A. Among the Stars is a 2014 video game by CBE Software. It is a remake of J.U.L.I.A., featuring improved graphics, a different gameplay and an expanded story.

== Gameplay ==
J.U.L.I.A. is an interfaced based point and click adventure game. Throughout the game the player controls various computer interfaces and a reconnaissance robot for planetary exploration.

== Plot ==
In 2430, an interstellar expedition was sent to a distant star system. Rachel Manners, an astrobiologist, awakes from cryogenic sleep by the ship's artificially intelligent computer J.U.L.I.A. to repair the ship, after it was damaged by asteroids. She finds out, that all other members of the expedition were awakened 60 years ago and died due to unknown circumstances.

Since J.U.L.I.A.s memory is partially wiped, Rachel and J.U.L.I.A. start to investigate what happened to the crew. All explorations of planets in the star system is provided by MOBOT, an exploration robot. During the exploration of the star system, the three reveal, that before the crew was killed, they attacked the sentient inhabitants of the planet Ambrosia and caused a blood bath. The crew had decided to cover up the incident by destroying the remaining Ambrosians with an advanced weapon, but were killed before that.

Rachel and J.U.L.I.A find a temple on a planet where they meet a member of a race of superior stone-like beings, that oversee the balance in the universe. It tells them about the race of Ancients that destroyed the Ambrosians because of their advanced culture and desolated their home world, before exiling the remaining of them to Ambrosia. The Ancients also poisoned the lake on Ambrosia, before disappearing forever.

Rachel, MOBOT and J.U.L.I.A. are tasked, by the stone-like being, to defeat Xir, a monster on a desert planet named Phaidros. They decide to use the weapon originally supposed to cover up the crew's failure. Xir gets eventually destroyed by the weapon and is revealed to be an extremely advanced machine. The remains direct to a new planet, that was concealed to the scanners until then. It was the home world of the Ancients before the stone-like beings apparently destroyed them. On this planet Rachel finds out that the crew was killed by J.U.L.I.A., in order to protect the Ambrosians, since as an advanced A.I., she is capable of compassion. Rachel is shocked, but in the end she reconciles with this fact. They also find a way to help the Ambrosians, but they need to use the resources on the ship necessary to get home.

If the player decides to get back on Earth, J.U.L.I.A. puts Rachel to cryogenic sleep and departs to Earth. If the player decides to help the Ambrosians, the lake is purified and Rachel wants to live with Ambrosians, but MOBOT and J.U.L.I.A. reveal that she would be slain by them. So they depart for new adventures. The game ends with Rachel doing science, while a stone-like creature is shown to have watched her. After the final credits, MOBOT is seen enjoying his time on a Planet Zenobia.

== Development ==
The original game was released in 2012 by Lace Mamba. It gained mixed reviews from players and CBE Software got into trouble as the publisher didn't pay the amount prescribed by the contract. It got CBE Software into financial trouble that the company eventually handled by launching an Indiegogo campaign for the Enhanced Edition of J.U.L.I.A.. The required amount was $5,000 but developers raised $14,200 and the game was also Greenlighted for Steam release. The project eventually transformed into a full-fledged remake and was released in October 2014.

The game was also sold directly by the developers via their own DRM-free webshop, additionally to gog.com. They had to stop direct sale due to a changed EU VAT legislation in 2015. The game was also delisted from gog.com on 22nd July 2026.

== Reception ==
The game has been well received by critics. The average score is 77.65% while median is 80%. It also holds 70% on Metacritic (based on 8 reviews).

The game has received a Silver Aggie Award for the Best Update/Remake.
