= Studio Trophis Production Company =

UK software company

Studio Trophis
- Type: Private
- Industry: Production Company
- Genre: Animations, and Video Games
- Founded: Sheffield, 2002
- Headquarters: HQ in Sheffield, United Kingdom,
- Key people: Richard Perrin, Paul Johnson, Zakir Rahman
- Products: The White Chamber
- Revenue: Unknown
- Number of employees: 3
- Website: StudioTrophis.com

The Studio Trophis Production Company, or Studio Trophis for short, was an independent video game developer, based in Sheffield, UK. Their first game, The White Chamber, a point-and-click sci-fi horror adventure, was released for the PC for free download via their website in 2005. They were working on their second game, entitled For The Game. On 26 December 2009, Studio Trophis had closed its doors, as all the other members were busy with their own projects and lives.

== History ==
Studio Trophis was initially formed by two Sheffield University students - Computer Science student Richard Perrin (later role Producer / Designer) and Japanese Studies student Paul Johnson (as Artist / Animator) - in 2002, to complete a game-creation project set by Richard's university. The project grew beyond the original assignment and pair decided to release it on the internet. Zakir Rahman (another Japanese Studies student, studying with Paul Johnson) joined them to provide music and sound effects. This game eventually became the white chamber, and took almost three years to complete including a one year hiatus, as each member of the team was busy with their studies and other commitments. However, in March 2005, the game was finally finished and released for free download from the Studio Trophis website.

As of May 2006 the game has been downloaded over 100,000 times and has featured on many magazines across the world (including the UK's best-selling SFX magazine and The New York Times) often appearing on cover discs.

== Games ==
Year	Title	Genres	Platforms
2005	The White Chamber	horror	Windows

== Creative Commons ==
All of the output from Studio Trophis available from their website is available for free download and is licensed under a Creative Commons license. The specific license (CC BY-NC-SA) used by Studio Trophis means anyone is free to copy or distribute their work as long as Studio Trophis is credited, that it is not for commercial gain and derivative works are under the same license.

== Influences and in-game references ==
Studio Trophis productions feature many in-jokes, pop culture and gaming references. This can be seen most heavily in the mock magazine article seen in their first game the white chamber. Here is a list of some of those documented so far:

- The magazine article in the white chamber contains anime styled versions of character from the popular webcomic Penny Arcade.
- the white chamber's Commander Artemis Trend and the team's Dare To Be Digital entry The Nipsy Restoration, are both references to a character, Nipsy Trend, from a Skid Row live video.
- A Nintendo Entertainment System and Commodore 64 tape deck can be seen in the storeroom of the white chamber, next to the mock magazine article. If the player attempts to use the NES (called an MES in the game), the character becomes trapped in a lo-res, 8-bit version of the game.
- The musical band advertised in the white chamber, The Helmeted Impostors (seen in the mock magazine article), are a reference to the character Jagi from the Japanese anime Fist of the North Star. The Helmeted Impostors look almost identical to Jagi, and their song "Say my name!" is Jagi's catchphrase ("Ore no na wo itte miro" in Japanese).
- The horror in the white chamber is heavily influenced by the game series, Silent Hill by Konami and the movie Event Horizon. A direct quote from Event Horizon can be seen when the players open a sealed metal box in the game.
- A red traffic light in the TV series Twin Peaks is shown just before particularly sinister moments in the show. It appears in the white chamber during the corridor sequence as a Twin Peaks reference.
- Dr Salt, a soft drink seen in the white chamber, is a reference to Dr Pepper.
- In the short animation, Better than Pizza, the pizza box contains the label Busey's Pizza. This is reference to the Hollywood actor Gary Busey.
- An e-mail described as a spam message promoting a concert of Nicole Ash with songs written by her fiancé, Lance Bishop, is a reference to the Avalon movie.
