= Gamercom =

Video game convention in Brazil

- Status: Active
- Genre: Video games
- Venue: Centro de Convenções de Florianópolis (CentroSul)
- Locations: Florianópolis, Santa Catarina
- Country: Brazil
- Inaugurated: 2015
- Attendance: 6,000 (2015); 8,283 (2016); 10,000 (2017)
- Organizer: Diego Oliveira

Gamercom is a yearly South American video game convention organized by business executives Diego Oliveira and Wallace Thomaz, that is currently held in Florianópolis, Brazil and is the main gaming convention in Southern Brazil.

== History ==
The Gamercom debuted on June 13, 2015, in Florianópolis, and what was expected to be an event for 4000 people, surprised and reached the mark of 6000 visitors and 25 companies. In its first edition, the Gamercom received the main first parties and publishers of the video game industry as Sony, Microsoft, Ubisoft, Warner Bros., Riot and Blizzard. The event exceeded expectations, reaching 6,000 participants mark and becoming the leading video game convention in southern Brazil.

The first edition of Gamercom met four areas: E-Sport, Indie Games, Exhibitors and Entertainment.

The Gamercom was the first convention of southern Brazil to bring major brands of video game industry and also dedicating an area to entertainment, bringing the famous Brazilian guitarist Kiko Loureiro of Megadeth to do a show playing the most famous video game music - the event received the Live Action of the game Mortal Kombat. In addition, the convention brought the Swiss award-winning studio, Apelab, which launched the first series of interactive animation for virtual reality devices, the game Sequenced.

The participation of major brands of the gaming industry turned Gamercom as one of the three major gaming trade shows in Latin America as well as the major gaming event in southern Brazil.

== Dates ==
Year	Dates	Partners	Location	City	Attendance
2015	13–14 June	PlayStation, Xbox, Ubisoft, Warner Bros., Riot, Blizzard and Apelab	CentroSul	Florianópolis	6,000
2016	11–12 June	PlayStation, Xbox, Warner, Ubisoft, Bandai Namco e Riot	CentroSul	Florianópolis	8,283
2017	08–9 July	TBA	CentroSul	Florianópolis	10,000

== Media coverage ==
Gamercom happens away from the states of Rio de Janeiro and São Paulo, which concentrate the main traditional and specialized media. Anyway the Gamercom had the youtubers coverage, streamers, media enthusiasts and media professionals. G1 - Globo News Portal, RIC TV, SBT, Band and specialized sites like Adrenaline covered closely all editions of Gamercom. Various gaming websites reported the Gamercom too.

Year	Dates	Professional Press	Enthusiast Press	YouTubers	Streamers
2015	13–14 June	8	10	20	5
2016	11–12 June	17	12	25	8
2017	08–9 July	-	-	-	-
