= City Harvest (United Kingdom) =

UK charitable organisation

City Harvest London is a charitable organisation focused on alleviating food insecurity and food waste across London. City Harvest feeds over 12,000 Londoners a day with quality, nutritious, surplus food from a myriad of food producers. City Harvest delivers food to over 350 organisations and projects in London that serve almost every vulnerable group in the capital, including (but not limited to) children, refugees, families, women facing domestic violence, and the homeless. Food often acts as a tool that breaks down barriers between organisations and their users and becomes a gateway to services which address other societal issues.

== History ==
City Harvest is London's first last-mile food rescue organisation, founded in 2014 after operating for 4 years as UR4Driving project which was run by Mark Harvey and Bruce Marquart. A group of individuals, including Laura Winningham OBE (CEO), began the organisation to address high levels of unused, but perfectly edible, food surplus that was being wasted by food businesses across London. The model was originally based on other international food rescue organisations, but was quickly adapted to suit the London city-scape. In London, an estimated amount of 13.3 million meals is wasted whilst at the same time 9.2 million meals are missed by people living in food poverty.

Since its founding, City Harvest has delivered over 20,000,000 meals worth of food to Londoners in need from its depot in Acton, West London.

== Goals ==
The goal of City Harvest London is to put surplus food to use in a sustainable way by distributing it to over 350+ organisations around London that feed the hungry. Using a fleet of refrigerated vans, City Harvest collects in-date surplus food from supermarkets, restaurants, manufacturers, caterers (including those running at exhibition centres such as Kensington Olympia), and other food businesses, and distributes it to community programmes in their network.

The charity claims to provide a solution to hunger, malnutrition, food insecurity, food waste, and greenhouse gas emissions and is data-driven to constantly improve and evolve the growing operation. The charity provides fresh fruit, vegetables, meat, fish, poultry, and other products to organisations and projects across London, serving free meals to vulnerable individuals. Some of the organisations they work with include FoodCycle, The American Church Soup Kitchen, St Mary The Boltons and St Andrew Holborn, among 350 others. Generally, many of the partnered charitable organisations will be multifunctional, not only offering free meals or food parcels with City Harvest surplus, but a whole host of services including support and consultation, alcoholism and addiction rehabilitation, pro-bono legal advice, activities and clubs for children, respite for carers, emergency response for domestic violence, refuge for homeless, youth workshops, and probation services.

City Harvest also works to create research on the scope of food poverty and food waste in London, statistics which are not yet tracked on a governmental level. Through their research, City Harvest has calculated that 9 million meals are needed per month to alleviate food insecurity in London.

City Harvest is a founding member of Xcess: The Independent Food Redistribution Network, made up of a group of likeminded organisations who sustainably repurpose surplus food in the UK to alleviate food poverty. This taskforce was established to harness the power of surplus food and to develop an innovative food redistribution model that seeks sustainable solutions to contemporary issues of food waste and insecurity.

== Achievements ==
City Harvest London’s operation to feed vulnerable community members, reduce and repurpose food waste and combat climate change, among other key goals, currently meets 9 of the UN Sustainable Development Goals.

In April 2018, the organisation delivered its two millionth recycled meal. By March 2019, it had served 5 million meals, and prevented 6,200 tonnes of greenhouse gas emissions. May 2021 saw City Harvest's 7th Anniversary and the biggest milestone yet: 20 million meals delivered to date

Laura Winningham OBE (CEO) was awarded an OBE in the Queen's Birthday Honours List 2020 for services to the community in London during the Covid-19. The work of City Harvest London was recognised as an outstanding emergency response to food waste and poverty before, during, and beyond, COVID-19.

== In the Media ==
=== The Macallan, Javi Aznarez & City Harvest ===
In October 2020, Sotheby's auctioned The Macallan Red Collection, an extremely rare set with unique labels designed by graphic artist Javi Aznarez. The Red Collection comprises Macallan's oldest ongoing aged expressions [...] and oldest bottlings the brand has ever released. The labels feature illustrations of Macallan greats: Alexander Reid, Roderick Kemp and Allan Shiach. The lot was sold at Sotheby's on Halloween for £756,400 with all proceeds going to City Harvest. In City Harvest terms, this equates to 2.5 million meals.

=== Distil your World: London Edition, The Macallan, Amazon Prime, Roca Brothers & City Harvest ===
City Harvest prides itself as being part of the fabric of London, as demonstrated in The Macallan series: Distil Your World. Distil your world was part of a 'sensorial journey through one of the world's greatest capital cities'. The Amazon Prime documentary follows the Macallan Whisky Maker, Steven Bremner, and the Roca brothers, as they explore the city from different perspectives including food, culture, innovation, and community spirit. The documentary benefit City Harvest London through its online promotion via Good-Loop, a media vendor that enables brands to support charities through their advertising campaigns.

=== Regeneration: Food with Max La Manna, BBC Earth ===
BBC Earth Regeneration: Food Series 1: Episode 5 entitled 'Waste' features an interview with City Harvest CEO, Laura Winningham, as part of sustainability advocate and author La Manna's mini-series on food sustainability. In this episode, La Manna explores the reality of food waste in the UK, and how it is mitigated through sustainable solutions that City Harvest offers, as well as the likes of SILO and Too Good to Go.
