= List of game engines =

Game engines are tools available to implement video games without building everything from the ground up. Whether they are 2D or 3D based, they offer tools to aid in asset creation and placement.

== Engines ==
The following list is not exhaustive. Also, it mixes game engines with rendering engines as well as API bindings without any distinctions.

Name (Alternate name)	Primary programming language	Release year	Scripting	Cross-platform	2D/3D oriented	Target platform	Notable games	License	Notes and references
4A Engine	C++	2010	None (native C++ development)	Yes	3D	Windows, macOS, Linux, PlayStation 3, PlayStation 4, Xbox 360, Xbox One	Metro 2033, Metro: Last Light, Metro Exodus	Proprietary	Developed by 4A Games; renowned for its advanced rendering techniques.
A-Frame (VR)	JavaScript	2015	JavaScript	Yes	3D	Cross-platform	Primarily experimental VR experiences (e.g., projects like Mozilla Hubs)	MIT	Open source Entity component system WebVR framework
Adventure Game Interpreter	C	1984	C style	Yes	2D	DOS, Apple SOS, ProDOS, Classic Mac OS, Atari TOS	List	Proprietary	The engine behind many early Sierra adventure titles, made specifically for adventure games.
Adventure Game Studio	C++	1997	AGSScript	Yes	2D	Windows, Linux	Chzo Mythos, Blackwell, Endacopia	Artistic 2.0	Mostly used to develop third-person pre-rendered graphic adventure games, one of the most popular for developing amateur adventure games
Aleph One	C++	1999	Lua, Marathon markup language	Yes	2.5D	Windows, Linux, macOS	Aleph One (Marathon remake)	GPL-3.0-or-later	FPS engine
Amazon Lumberyard	C++	2015	Lua	Yes	3D	PlayStation 4, Xbox One, Windows	New World	Proprietary	The software is free to download and use, however, it works closely with Amazon services.
Anvil (Scimitar) (AnvilNext)	C++, C#	2009	Proprietary	Yes	3D	Cross-platform except Linux	List	Proprietary	Developed by Ubisoft, uses a custom scripting framework
AppGameKit	C++, BASIC	2016	C#, C++, AGK BASIC	Yes	2D, 3D	Windows, macOS, iOS, Android, HTML5, Raspberry Pi	N/a	Proprietary	Designed for rapid game development specifically for beginners and indie game developers.
Ardor3D	Java	2008	None (native Java development)	Yes	3D	Cross-platform	Mainly academic projects/simulations; no major commercial titles	zlib	Fork of jMonkeyEngine 2.0
Aurora toolset	C++	2002	NWScript	Yes	3D	Windows, Linux, macOS	Neverwinter Nights	Proprietary	Originally developed by BioWare, it provided a framework for creating rRPGs.
Babylon.js	JavaScript, TypeScript	2013	JavaScript, TypeScript	Yes	3D	Cross-Platform	Various browser-based 3D experiences	Apache License 2.0	A powerful open source 3D engine for the web, Babylon.js simplifies development of interactive 3D so it can run on WebGL.
Blend4Web	JavaScript, Python, C, C++	2018	JavaScript	Yes	3D	WebGL, Windows, Linux, macOS, iOS, Android	Experience Curiosity	GPLv3 or commercial	Game content, including graphics, animation, sound, and physics, is authored in the 3D modeling and animation suite Blender
Blender Game Engine	C, C++	2000	Python	Yes	2D, 3D	Windows, Linux, macOS, Solaris	Yo Frankie!, Sintel The Game, ColorCube	GPL-2.0-or-later	2D/3D game engine packaged in a 3D modelar with integrated Bullet physics library
Build engine	C	1995		Yes	2.5D	Windows, Linux, macOS, DOS	Duke Nukem 3D, Shadow Warrior, Blood, Redneck Rampage	Custom, free non-commercial use	FPS engine; 2.5D, 2D grid base geometry
Buildbox	C++	2014	Optional (JavaScript)	Yes	2D, 3D	Windows, macOS, iOS, Android		Proprietary	2D/3D game builder with drag and drop functionalities, coding optional (not required), FREE license available
C4 Engine	C++	2015	C++, Visual Script	Yes	3D	Windows, PlayStation 5, PlayStation 4, Xbox One	List	Proprietary	
Chrome Engine	C++	2002		Yes	3D	Windows, Linux, PlayStation 4, Xbox One	List	Proprietary	
ClanLib	C	1999		Yes	2.5D	Windows, Linux, macOS		zlib	
Clausewitz	C++	2007		Yes	3D	Windows, macOS, Linux	All Paradox Development Studio games since 2007	Proprietary	
Clickteam Fusion	(Event-based Scripting w/ C++Support)	1994		Yes	2D, 2.5D, 3D	Windows, iOS, Android, HTML5, Adobe Flash	Five Nights at Freddy's, Baba Is You	Proprietary	
Cobra Engine	C++, C#	1988	Lua	Yes	3D	Windows, Xbox One, PlayStation 4, iOS, Android	RollerCoaster Tycoon 3, Planet Coaster, Planet Zoo, Jurassic World Evolution, Elite Dangerous	Proprietary	
Cocos2d, Cocos2d-x, Cocos2d-html5	C++, Python, Objective-C, JavaScript	2010	C++, JavaScript, Java, Lua	Yes	2D, 2.5D, 3D	Windows, Linux, macOS, iOS, Android, BlackBerry, Tizen	Geometry Dash	MIT	Android target binds to Java; iOS target uses Objective-C
Codea	Lua	2011		No	2D, 3D	iOS		Apache 2.0	
CraftStudio	C#	2015	Lua	Yes	2D, 3D	Windows, macOS, Linux		Free use	Used to create voxel-based games.
Construct	C++	2007	JavaScript, Event System	Yes	2D, 2.5D, 3D	Windows, macOS, Wii U, HTML5 capable web browsers	Hypnospace Outlaw	Proprietary, GPL Classic version	
Coretech	C++	2009	Lua	Yes	3D	Cross-platform	Warhammer 40,000: Inquisitor - Martyr, King Arthur: Knight's Tale	Proprietary	Developed in-house by NeocoreGames
Creation Engine	C++	2011	Papyrus	Yes	3D	Windows, PlayStation 3, Xbox 360, Xbox One, PlayStation 4	The Elder Scrolls V: Skyrim, Fallout 4, Fallout 76	Proprietary	
CryEngine	C++	2002	C++, C#	Yes	3D	Windows, macOS, Linux, PlayStation 3, PlayStation 4, Wii U, Xbox 360, Xbox One, iOS, Android	Crysis, Far Cry	Proprietary	
Crystal Tools	C++	2007		Yes	3D	PlayStation 3, Xbox 360, Windows, Wii	List	Proprietary	
Crystal Space	C++	1997	Java, Perl, Python	Yes	3D	Windows, Linux, macOS	Keepsake, Yo Frankie!	LGPL-2.0-or-later	
Cube Engine	C++	2001	CubeScript	Yes	3D	Windows, Linux, macOS	AssaultCube, Cube	zlib	Prior generation (means it has a successor), 2D grid-based system, optimized for outdoor not indoor maps
Cube 2 Engine	C++	2004	CubeScript	Yes	3D	Windows, Linux, macOS	Cube 2: Sauerbraten	zlib	Efficient 6-directional height map based geometry (versus traditional Polygon soup model), hence the name Cube, FPS engine
Dagor Engine	C++	2017		Yes	3D	Windows, PlayStation 4, PlayStation 3, Xbox 360, Linux, macOS	List	BSD	
Dark Engine	C++	1995		No	3D	Windows	Thief: The Dark Project, System Shock 2, Thief II: The Metal Age	Proprietary	Advanced AI and sound features (full control of sound propagation). Edited with DromEd.
Decima	C++	2013		Yes	3D	PlayStation 4, PlayStation 5, Windows	Death Stranding, Horizon Zero Dawn, Killzone: Shadow Fall, Until Dawn, Until Dawn: Rush of Blood, Horizon Forbidden West	Proprietary	
Defold	C++	2016	Lua	Yes	2D, 3D	iOS, Android, HTML5, Windows, macOS, Linux, Nintendo Switch, PlayStation 4		Defold License 1.0	Scene Editor, Particle Fx editor, Tilemap Editor, Code Editor, Debugger. Extend the engine with your own native code (C/C++, Obj-C, Java, JavaScript).
Delta3D	C++	2004	Python	Yes	2.5D	Cross-platform		LGPL-2.1-or-later	
Dim3	C++	2014	JavaScript	Yes	3D	Cross-platform		MIT	
DimensioneX Multiplayer Engine	Java	2001	Java, VBScript	Yes	2.5D	Cross-platform		GPL	Produces browser games with pseudo-3D views; games can be made into Facebook Apps; intended for beginners
Divinity Engine	C++, C#	2014	Proprietary	Yes	3D	Windows, macOS, PlayStation 5, Xbox	Divinity: Original Sin, Divinity: Original Sin II, Baldur's Gate 3	Proprietary	Developed by Larian Studios to support their own games developments
DX Studio	C++	2008	JavaScript	No	3D	Windows		Proprietary, Freeware	
Dunia Engine	C++	2007		Yes	3D	Windows, PlayStation 3 and onwards, Xbox 360 and onwards	List	Proprietary	Software fork of CryEngine
EGO	C++	2008		Yes	3D	PlayStation 3, Windows, Xbox 360, macOS, Wii, Wii U, Xbox One, PlayStation 4	List	Proprietary	Primarily used for racing games
Electron toolset	C#	2013	NWScript	No	3D	Windows	Neverwinter Nights 2	Proprietary	
Enforce	C#	1999		No	3D	Windows	Shade: Wrath of Angels, Alpha Prime, Carrier Command: Gaea Mission, Take On Mars	Proprietary	
Enigma Engine	C++			Yes	3D	Windows, macOS,	Blitzkrieg, Blitzkrieg 2	Proprietary	
Essence Engine	C++			No	3D	Windows	List	Proprietary	
Exult	C++			Yes	2D	Windows, Linux, macOS, BSD	Ultima VII	GPL-2.0-or-later	Free software re-implemented Ultima VII game engine
Flare3D	ActionScript 3			Yes	3D	Web, Windows, iOS, Android, BlackBerry	List	Proprietary	
Flixel	ActionScript			Yes	2D		Various games by Gregory Weir	MIT	Boilerplate code for Flash games
ForgeLight	C++	2009		Yes	3D	Windows, PlayStation 4, Xbox One	Free Realms, PlanetSide 2, Landmark, EverQuest Next, H1Z1: Just Survive, H1Z1: King of the Kill	Proprietary	
Fox Engine	C++	2013		Yes	3D	Windows, PlayStation 3, PlayStation 4, Xbox 360, Xbox One	List	Proprietary	
Freescape	C	1987	Freescape Command Language	Yes	3D	Amstrad CPC, ZX Spectrum, IBM PC, Commodore 64, Amiga, Atari ST	List	Proprietary	
FreeSpace 2 Source Code Project	C++	2002		Yes	3D	Windows, macOS, Linux, FreeBSD	FreeSpace 2; several projects, including games based on the Babylon 5 and 2004 Battlestar Galactica universes.	Freeware for non-commercial use	
Frostbite	C++	2008		Yes	3D	Windows, PlayStation 3, PlayStation 4, Xbox 360, Xbox One	List	Proprietary	Used originally for the Battlefield video games
Future Pinball				No	3D	Windows		Freeware	
Gamebryo	C++	1997		Yes	3D	Windows, PlayStation 3, PlayStation 4, Xbox 360, Xbox One	List	Proprietary	
Game Editor	C++	2003	Custom (C styled)	Yes	2D	iPhone, iPad, macOS, Windows (95-Windows 7), Linux, Windows-based smartphones, GP2X, Pocket PCs, Handheld PCs		GPL, Proprietary	
GameMaker	GameMaker Language	1999	GameMaker Language, JavaScript, C++, GLSL, HLSL	Yes	2D	Windows, UWP, Xbox 360, Xbox One, Xbox Series X/S, PlayStation 3, PlayStation 4, PlayStation 5, PlayStation Vita, macOS, Ubuntu, HTML5, Android, iOS, Windows Phone, Tizen, Amazon Fire TV, Nintendo Switch, Nintendo Switch 2, Raspberry Pi	AM2R, Deltarune, Hotline Miami, Hyper Light Drifter, Minit, Nuclear Throne, Pizza Tower, Undertale, VA-11 Hall-A, Wandersong	Proprietary	Limited 3D abilities
GameSalad	Lang		Script	Yes	2D	iOS, Android		Proprietary	
Gamestudio	C++		CScript, Lite-C	No	3D	Windows	List	Proprietary	Games can be published royalty-free
GDevelop	C++, JavaScript	2008	Events editor, JavaScript (Optional)	Yes	2D, 3D	Windows, Linux, macOS, HTML5, Android, iOS, Facebook Instant Games		MIT	Drag-and-drop game engine for everyone, almost everything can be done from the GUI, no coding experience required to make games
Genie Engine	C++			Yes	2D	Windows, PlayStation 2, Xbox One, Xbox Series X/S	Age of Empires, Age of Empires II, Star Wars: Galactic Battlegrounds, Age of Empires II: HD Edition, Age of Empires: Definitive Edition, Age of Empires II: Definitive Edition	Proprietary	
Godot	GDScript	2014	GDScript (like Python), C#, Visual Script, GDNative	Yes	2D, 2.5D, 3D	Windows, macOS, Linux, UWP, iOS, Android, HTML and Web Assembly	Cruelty Squad, Hardcoded, Kingdoms of the Dump, Cassette Beasts, Brotato, "Buckshot Roulette", "Slay the Spire II"	MIT	3.0+ adds C# scripting plus other languages via modules and GDNative. PBR and Global Illumination.
Gold Box	Assembly, Pascal, C, C++			Yes	2D	Amiga, Apple II, Atari ST, Commodore 64/128, DOS, Macintosh, Nintendo Entertainment System, PC-9801, Sega Genesis	Pool of Radiance, Gateway to the Savage Frontier, Champions of Krynn, Buck Rogers: Countdown to Doomsday, Neverwinter Nights, Spelljammer: Pirates of Realmspace	Proprietary	SSI's engine for Advanced Dungeons & Dragons role-playing games
GoldSrc Half-Life engine	C, C++, Assembly	1998		Yes	3D	Windows, macOS, Linux, PlayStation 2, Xbox, Dreamcast	Half-Life, Opposing Force, Team Fortress Classic, Sven Co-op, Counter-Strike, Ricochet, Day of Defeat	Proprietary	Highly modified Quake engine
HeroEngine	C++, C#		HeroScript Language	No	3D	Windows	Star Wars: The Old Republic	Proprietary	
Horde3D	C++			Yes	3D	Windows, Linux	Offroad Legends, Timelines: Assault on America	EPL	Small 3D rendering engine for large crowds of animated characters
HPL Engine	C++	2007	AngelScript	Yes	3D	Windows, Linux, macOS	Penumbra: Overture, Penumbra: Black Plague, Penumbra: Requiem, Amnesia: The Dark Descent, Amnesia: A Machine for Pigs, Soma	Proprietary, GPL-3.0-or-later (version 1 and 2)	Cross-platform, compatible with OpenGL, OpenAL, and Newton Game Dynamics libraries; defining features include ability for advanced object interaction via use of Newton's physics code
Wolfenstein 3D engine	C	1992		Yes	2.5D	Windows, Linux, macOS	Wolfenstein 3D, Spear of Destiny, Blake Stone: Aliens of Gold, Corridor 7: Alien Invasion, Blake Stone: Planet Strike, Operation Body Count, Super 3D Noah's Ark	GPL-2.0-or-later	
Doom engine	C	1993	ACS	Yes	2.5D	Windows, Linux, macOS	Doom, Doom II, Heretic, Hexen, Strife, Chex Quest	GPL-2.0-or-later	2D-based level geometry, sprites, and particles, but renders a 3D space.
Quake engine	C	1996	QuakeC	Yes	3D	Windows, Linux, macOS	Quake, Hexen II, Wrath: Aeon of Ruin	GPL-2.0-or-later	The first true 3D id Tech engine.
id Tech 2 Quake II engine	C	1997	C	Yes	3D	Windows, Linux, macOS	Quake II, Heretic II, SiN, Daikatana, Gravity Bone	GPL-2.0-or-later	Improvements to the Quake engine.
id Tech 3 Quake III Arena engine	C	1999	C	Yes	3D	Windows, Linux, macOS	Quake III Arena, Heavy Metal: F.A.K.K. 2, American McGee's Alice, Call of Duty, Quake Live	GPL-2.0-or-later	
id Tech 4 Doom 3 engine	C++	2004	C++ via DLLs	Yes	3D	Windows, Linux, macOS	Doom 3, Quake 4, Prey, Enemy Territory: Quake Wars, Wolfenstein, Brink, Quadrilateral Cowboy, Skin Deep	GPL-3.0-or-later	Features advanced lighting, shadows, interactive GUI surfaces.
id Tech 5	C++, AMPL, Clipper, Python	2011	Script	Yes	3D	Windows, macOS, Xbox 360, Xbox One, PlayStation 3, PlayStation 4	Rage, Wolfenstein: The New Order, Wolfenstein: The Old Blood, The Evil Within	Proprietary	First id Tech engine to feature MegaTexture technology, starting with Rage
id Tech 6	C++	2016	None (native C++ only)	Yes	3D	Windows, Xbox One, PlayStation 4, Nintendo Switch	Doom (2016), Wolfenstein II: The New Colossus	Proprietary	
id Tech 7	C++	2020	None	Yes	3D	Windows, PlayStation 4, Xbox One, Nintendo Switch	Doom Eternal, Indiana Jones and the Great Circle	Proprietary	
id Tech 8	C++	2025		Yes	3D	Windows, PlayStation 5, Xbox Series X/S	Doom: The Dark Ages	Proprietary	
iMUSE	C++	1991	N/a	—N/a	—N/a	Integrated with other engines	Monkey Island 2: LeChuck's Revenge, all LucasArts adventure games afterwards	Proprietary	Dynamic music system
Infinity Engine	C++	1992	None (custom scripting not publicly disclosed.)	Yes	2D	Windows, Mac OS, macOS, AmigaOS 4	Baldur's Gate, Planescape: Torment, Icewind Dale, Baldur's Gate II: Shadows of Amn, Icewind Dale II	Proprietary	
Irrlicht	C++	2003	C++	Yes	3D	Windows, Mac OS, Linux, Windows CE	List of Irrlicht games	zlib	Open source, audio with extension
ioquake3	C	2005	None	Yes	3D	Windows, Linux, macOS	Urban Terror, OpenArena	GPL-2.0-or-later	
Iron Engine	C++	2008	None (native C++ integration)	No	3D	Windows	Sins of a Solar Empire, Sins of a Dark Age	Proprietary	
IW engine	C++	2003	Custom (C styled) (derived from QuakeC)	Yes	3D	Windows, macOS, PlayStation 4, PlayStation 3, Xbox One, Xbox 360, Wii U, Wii	Call of Duty series	Proprietary	Originally built from id Tech 3
Jade	C++	2003	Custom proprietary scripting	Yes	3D	Cross-platform	List	Proprietary	
Jake2	Java	2006	None	Yes	3D	Cross-platform		GPL	Java port of Quake II game engine
Java 3D	Java	1998	Java	Yes	3D	Cross-platform		BSD	Community-centric project. Used by many schools as part of course work
Jedi	C			Yes	2.5D	DOS, Windows	Star Wars: Dark Forces, Outlaws	Proprietary	Rumored to have been reverse-engineered from Doom engine
jMonkeyEngine	Java	2004		Yes	3D	Cross-platform	Grappling Hook	BSD	Community-centric project, used by several commercial game studios
Kinetica				No	3D	PlayStation 2	List	Proprietary	
Kivy (framework)	Python	2011	Kv	Yes	2.5D	Windows, Linux, macOS, iOS, Android		MIT	For rapid development, can make multi-touch apps
LayaAir			ActionScript 3, JavaScript, TypeScript	Yes	2D, 3D	WebGL, Windows, Linux, macOS, iOS, Android		GPL or commercial	2D/3D game engine and also VR mode, provide free tools to convert 3d assets content from FBX files or Unity scene.
Leadwerks	C++		Lua	Yes	3D	Windows, Linux		Proprietary	
LibGDX	Java, Kotlin	2014		Yes	2D, 3D	Linux, Windows, macOS, iOS, Android, Java applet, WebGL	Mindustry, Ingress, Slay the Spire	Apache 2.0	Java game development framework, provides a unified API that works across all supported platforms
LithTech				Yes	3D	Cross-platform	List	Proprietary	
Luminous Engine				Yes	3D	PlayStation 4, Xbox One, Windows	Final Fantasy XV	Proprietary	
LyN				Yes	3D	Cross-platform	List	Proprietary	Intended to scale effectively on 7th and 8th generation consoles
LÖVE	C++	2008	Lua	Yes	2D	iOS, Android, Windows, Linux, macOS, NetBSD, FreeBSD, OpenBSD, Solaris, and all platforms supported by pkgsrc	Mari0, Journey to the Center of Hawkthorne, Move or Die, Balatro	zlib	
M.U.G.E.N	C			Yes	2D	Linux, DOS, Windows, macOS		Freeware	Used Allegro initially, now uses on SDL
Marmalade	C++, Lua, Objective-C, HTML5		Lua, 2DKit	Yes	2D, 3D	iOS, Android, BlackBerry, Windows 10, Fire OS, macOS, Windows, Tizen, Roku, Chromecast	Angry Birds POP!, Cut the Rope, Call of Duty: World at War: Zombies, Doodle Jump, Draw Something, Godus, Lara Croft and the Guardian of Light, Metal Gear Solid Mobile	Proprietary	High-performance, cross-platform, with authoring tools and asset store
Messiah	C++	2013	Lua	Yes	3D	PlayStation 5, Windows, iOS, Android	Diablo Immortal, Where Winds Meet	Proprietary	Developed by NetEase.
Moai SDK	C++		Lua	Yes	2D	Windows, macOS, iOS, Android, Linux	Broken Age	CPAL	
MT Framework	C++			Yes	3D	PlayStation 3, Xbox 360, Windows, Wii, Wii U, Nintendo 3DS, PlayStation Vita	List	Proprietary	Intended to be 7th generation console engine, replaced by Panta Rhei
Monkey X			Monkey, C++, C#, Java, JavaScript, ActionScript	Yes	2D	Windows, macOS, Linux	Crypt of the NecroDancer	MIT	
MonoGame / XNA	C#	2009	C#	Yes	2D, 3D	Windows, macOS, Xbox One, PlayStation 4, PlayStation Vita, Windows Phone, iOS, Android, Windows Store, Ouya, BSD	Skulls of the Shogun, Terraria, Bastion, TowerFall, Transistor, Fez, Axiom Verge, Celeste, Stardew Valley	Microsoft Public	C# game development framework, successor to Microsoft XNA.
Northlight	C++, D		D	Yes	3D	Windows, Xbox One, PlayStation 4, PlayStation 5, Xbox Series X and Series S	Control, CrossfireX (Story Mode), Quantum Break, Alan Wake 2	Proprietary	Small amount of code in Quantum Break is written in D programming language.
NScripter	C++	1999		No	2D	Windows	Tsukihime, Higurashi When They Cry, Umineko When They Cry	Proprietary	Used to develop visual novels and first-person adventure games
O3DE	C++, Python	2021	Lua, Script Canvas	Yes	3D	Windows, macOS, iOS, Linux, Android		Apache 2.0; MIT License	3D rendering engine used by New World and several other games
Odyssey Engine				Yes	3D	Windows, macOS	Star Wars: Knights of the Old Republic, Star Wars: Knights of the Old Republic II: The Sith Lords	Proprietary	
OGRE	C++	2005	C++	Yes	3D	Linux, Windows (all major versions), macOS, NaCl, WinRT, Windows Phone 8, iOS and Android	Torchlight, Kenshi, Running with Rifles, Zombie Driver, X-Morph Defense	MIT	3D rendering engine used by several games
OHRRPGCE	FreeBASIC		HamsterSpeak	Yes	2D	Windows, macOS, Linux, Android		GPL-2.0-or-later	Role-playing game creation system; use of scripting is optional
OpenClonk	C++		C4Script	Yes	2.5D	Windows, Linux, macOS	OpenClonk	ISC	Engine for 2D action/strategy platformers with 3D graphics
OpenMW	C++		mwscript, Lua	Yes	3D	Windows, Linux, macOS		GPL-3.0-or-later	Reimplementation of the Morrowind game engine
OpenSimulator	C#		LSL	Yes	3D	Windows, Linux, macOS, FreeBSD		BSD	Server platform to host virtual worlds, compatible with Second Life clients
ORX	C/C++	2009	Custom	Yes	2.5D	Windows, Linux, macOS, iOS, Android		zlib	3D accelerated
Panda3D	C++, Python	2002	Python	Yes	3D	Windows, Linux, macOS, iOS, Android	Toontown Online, Pirates of the Caribbean Online	BSD	
Panta Rhei				Yes	3D	PlayStation 4, Xbox One, Windows	Deep Down	Proprietary	Successor to MT Framework for 8th generation consoles
Phaser	JavaScript		JavaScript	Yes	2D	Cross-platform	Vampire Survivors	MIT	
PhyreEngine	C++			Yes	3D	PC, PlayStation Portable, PlayStation Vita, PlayStation 3, PlayStation 4	List	Proprietary, Freeware	
Pico-8	Lua	2015		Yes	2D	Windows, macOS, Linux, HTML5	Celeste Classic, UFO Swamp Odyssey, Pico Racer, P.Craft	Proprietary	Strict limitations to game design: 32kB cartridge size, 16 colours, 4 channel wavetable sound, 128x128 pixels, 256 sprites of 8x8 pixels.
Pie in the Sky	C			Yes	2.5D	DOS, Windows, macOS	List	Proprietary	
Pixel Game Maker MV	JavaScript		JavaScript, CoffeeScript	Yes	2D	Windows, Nintendo Switch		Proprietary	
PlayCanvas	JavaScript		JavaScript	Yes	3D	Windows, Linux, macOS, iOS, HTML5, Android		MIT	Users can work on game at the same time via online browser and publish to multiple platforms; engine uses WebGL and includes physics
PlayN	Java			Yes	2D	iOS, Android, HTML5, Windows, Linux		Apache 2.0	
Pygame	Python	2000	Python	Yes	2D	Windows, macOS (OS X), BeOS, FreeBSD, IRIX, Linux	List	LGPL	
Pyrogenesis	C++		JavaScript	Yes	3D	Windows, Linux, macOS	0 A.D.	LGPL	Designed for RTS games
Q		2008		Yes	3D	Windows, macOS, Linux, PS2, PS3, Wii		Proprietary	
Qfusion	C/C++		AngelScript	Yes	3D	Windows, Linux, macOS, Android	Warsow	GPL-2.0-or-later	
REDengine	C++			Yes	3D	Windows, macOS, Xbox 360, Xbox One, Xbox Series X/S, PlayStation 4, PlayStation 5	The Witcher 2: Assassins of Kings, The Witcher 3: Wild Hunt, Cyberpunk 2077	Proprietary	
Ren'Py	Python		Pygame	Yes	2D	Windows, macOS, Linux, Android, OpenBSD	Analogue: A Hate Story, Jisei, Katawa Shoujo, Doki Doki Literature Club!	MIT	Used to develop visual novels and first-person adventure games
RenderWare	C++	1993	RWX	Yes	3D	Windows, Mac OS, GameCube, Wii, Xbox, Xbox 360, PlayStation 2, PlayStation 3, PlayStation Portable	Grand Theft Auto III, Grand Theft Auto: Vice City, Grand Theft Auto: San Andreas, Sonic Heroes, SpongeBob SquarePants: Battle for Bikini Bottom, SpongeBob SquarePants: Lights, Camera, Pants!, The Incredibles, The SpongeBob SquarePants Movie	Proprietary	RenderWare script available in version 2 only
Roblox	Lua	2006	Luau	Yes	3D	Windows, macOS, iOS, Android, Xbox One, Meta Quest 2, Meta Quest Pro, PlayStation 4, PlayStation 5	List	Proprietary	
Rockstar Advanced Game Engine (RAGE)	C++	2006		Yes	3D	Windows, PlayStation 3, PlayStation 4, Wii, Xbox 360, Xbox One	List	Proprietary	
RPG Maker		1992 (As RPG Tsukūru Dante 98)	Ruby, JavaScript	Yes	2D	PC-8801, MSX2, PC-9801, Super Famicom, Windows, PlayStation, Game Boy Color, PlayStation 2, Game Boy Advance, Nintendo DS, macOS, Linux, iOS, Android, PlayStation 4, Nintendo Switch	Alpha Kimori, Ao Oni, Aveyond series, Corpse Party, Eternal Eden, Laxius Force, Omori, One Night Trilogy, Super Columbine Massacre RPG!, To the Moon, Yume Nikki	Proprietary	Series of game creation systems, allows users to build their own role-playing games
S&box	C++	2026	C#	Yes	2D, 2.5D, 3D	Windows, Linux		MIT	Based on a heavily modified version of Valve's Source 2 on the Half-Life: Alyx branch
SAGE				Yes	3D	Windows, Macintosh, Xbox 360, PlayStation 3	List	Proprietary	Used for real-time strategy games
SCUMM				Yes	2D	3DO, Amiga, Apple II, Atari ST, CDTV, Commodore 64, FM Towns & Marty, Macintosh, Nintendo Entertainment System, DOS, Windows, Sega Mega-CD, TurboGrafx-16/PC Engine	See Category:SCUMM games	Proprietary	Full name is Script Creation Utility for Maniac Mansion, from the first game it was used with; uses iMUSE and INSANE; ScummVM provides an open source re-creation
Scratch		2007		Yes	2D	Cross-platform		GPL-2.0-or-later	
Serious Engine				Yes	3D		Serious Sam series	Proprietary	
Shark 3D	C++		Python	Yes	3D	Windows, Xbox, Xbox 360	Dreamfall: The Longest Journey	Proprietary	
Silent Storm engine				No	3D	Windows	Silent Storm, Night Watch, Hammer & Sickle, Day Watch	Proprietary	Used for turn-based tactics games
Snowdrop	C++			Yes	3D	Cross-platform except Linux and mobile	Tom Clancy's The Division, South Park: The Fractured but Whole, Mario + Rabbids Kingdom Battle, Avatar: Frontiers of Pandora, Star Wars Outlaws	Proprietary	Developed by Massive Entertainment
Solar2D	Lua			Yes	2D	iOS, Android, Kindle, Windows Phone 8, Apple TV, Android TV, macOS, Windows, Linux		MIT	
Source	C++	2004	Squirrel, Lua, Python	Yes	3D	Windows, macOS, Linux, PlayStation 3, Xbox, Xbox 360, Android	Half-Life 2, Counter-Strike: Source, Left 4 Dead, Portal, Team Fortress 2, others (list)	Proprietary	The SDK is bundled with many Source games
Source 2	C++	2015	Lua	Yes	3D	Windows, macOS, Linux, Android, iOS	Dota 2 (port), The Lab (limited), Artifact, Dota Underlords, Half-Life: Alyx, Counter-Strike 2, Deadlock	Proprietary	The first game using Source 2, Dota 2, was ported over from the original Source engine. One of The Lab's minigame Robot Repair uses Source 2 engine while rest of seven uses Unity's engine.
Starling Framework	ActionScript			Yes	2D	Windows, macOS, Linux, iOS, Android	Angry Birds Friends, Incredipede	BSD Simplified	Recreates the traditional Flash display list architecture on accelerated graphics hardware
Stencyl	Haxe		Haxe, VPL	Yes	2D	Flash, HTML5, iOS, Android, Linux, macOS, Windows	Cat Bird	Proprietary	Free to publish to Flash and HTML5. Subscription required for publishing to desktop or mobile.
Autodesk Stingray (Bitsquid)	Lua			Yes	3D	Windows, macOS, Linux, iOS, Android, PlayStation 4, PlayStation 3, Xbox 360	Escape Dead Island, Hamilton's Great Adventure, Krater, Gauntlet, Helldivers, Helldivers 2, Magicka 2, The Showdown Effect, War of the Vikings, War of the Roses, Warhammer: End Times - Vermintide, Warhammer: Vermintide 2	Proprietary	
StepMania	C++		Lua	Yes	3D	Cross-platform	In the Groove, Pump It Up Pro, Pump It Up Infinity	MIT	A rhythm video game and engine that was originally developed as a simulator of Konami's DDR
Stratagus	C++	1998	Lua	Yes	2D	Linux	Bos Wars	GPL-2.0-only	For real-time strategy games
Stride	C#		C#	Yes	2D, 3D	Windows, Linux, Xbox One, iOS, Android, UWP		MIT	Built in .NET, so it always supports latest C#. Previously known as Paradox and Xenko.
Three.js	JavaScript	2010	JavaScript	Yes	2D, 3D	HTML5, Windows, Linux, macOS, iOS, Android		MIT	
TIC-80	Lua, JavaScript, Ruby, others	2017		Yes	2D	HTML5, Windows, Linux, macOS, Raspberry Pi, Nintendo 3DS		MIT	Intentionally limited specifications, including a 240x136 display; a 16 color palette; 256 8x8 sprites; and 4-channel sound.
TOSHI				Yes	3D	Windows, GameCube, Wii, PlayStation 2, Xbox	Jurassic Park: Operation Genesis, Nicktoons Unite!, Barnyard, El Tigre: The Adventures of Manny Rivera, Marvel Super Hero Squad, de Blob	Proprietary	
Torque3D	C++	2012	TorqueScript	Yes	3D	Windows, Linux, macOS	Marble Blast Gold, Tribes 2, Blockland	MIT	Includes multiplayer network code, seamless indoor-outdoor rendering engines, skeletal animation, drag and drop GUI creation, built in world editor, C-like scripting language
Treyarch NGL		2002		Yes	3D	Windows, PlayStation 2, PlayStation 3, Xbox, Xbox 360, GameCube, Wii	Spider-Man, Spider-Man 2, Call of Duty 2: Big Red One, Call of Duty 3		Used by Treyarch for their Call of Duty games until 2008 when they replaced it for the IW Engine
Turbulenz	TypeScript		JavaScript	Yes	2D, 3D	HTML5, iOS, Android		MIT	
Twine	CSS/JavaScript	2009	JavaScript	Yes	2D	Windows, macOS, Linux, Web application	Depression Quest, The Temple of No	GPL	Exports HTML without server. Used for text games and visual novels.
UbiArt Framework	C++			Yes	2.5D	Cross-platform	Rayman Origins, Rayman Legends, Child of Light, Valiant Hearts: The Great War	Proprietary	
Unigine	C++	2005	C#, UnigineScript, GLSL, HLSL, UUSL	Yes	3D	Windows, Linux, macOS, PlayStation 3, Android, iOS	List	Proprietary	Focused on large open scenes: 64-bit precision of coordinates, support for geo coordinates, round Earth model. Mainly used in enterprise and professional simulators.
Unity	C++	2005	C#, Visual scripting (Bolt)	Yes	2D, 2.5D, 3D	Windows, macOS, Linux, Xbox 360, Xbox One, Wii U, New 3DS, Nintendo Switch, PlayStation 4, PlayStation Vita, Windows Phone, iOS, Android, BlackBerry 10, Tizen, Unity Web Player, Windows Store, WebGL, Oculus Rift, Gear VR, Android TV, Samsung Smart TV	Pokémon Go, Monument Valley, Call of Duty: Mobile, Beat Saber, Cuphead, Genshin Impact, Subnautica, The Forest	Proprietary	Bolt was acquired by Unity Technologies in May 2020, henceforth introducing Visual Scripting in Unity
Unreal Engine	C++	1998	C++, Visual Scripting (Blueprint)	Yes	3D	Cross-platform	Unreal series, Fortnite, Gears of War, Valorant	Proprietary	UnrealScript was removed in version 4
V-Play Game Engine	C++		QML, JavaScript	Yes	2D	iOS, Android, Windows, macOS	List	Proprietary	Built on Qt
Vengeance Engine	C++			No	3D	Windows	Tribes: Vengeance, SWAT 4	Proprietary	Based on Unreal Engine version 2/2.5
Vicarious Visions Alchemy	Lang	2002	Script	Yes	3D	GameCube, Wii, WiiWare, WiiU, Nintendo Switch, Xbox, Xbox 360, Xbox Live Arcade, Xbox One, PlayStation 2, PlayStation Portable, PlayStation Network, PlayStation 3, PlayStation 4, Microsoft Windows, Android, iOS, tvOS	Skylanders, Crash Bandicoot	Proprietary	
Virtools	C++	1999	VSL, Visual Scripting	Yes	3D	Windows, Xbox, PlayStation 2, Xbox 360, PlayStation 3, PSP, Wii, IE6, Google Chrome	Ballance, Syberia, Sang-Froid: Tales of Werewolves, Lazy Raiders, Online Chess Kingdoms, Deer Avenger, Art of Murder, Demolition Champions, Jack the Ripper, Michael Schumacher Racing World Kart	Proprietary	Spearheaded visual scripting and rapid game prototyping
Vision	Lang		Script	Yes	3D	Windows, Xbox 360, PlayStation 3, Wii, Wii U, iOS, Android, PlayStation Vita, IE6 and up, Firefox 2.0 and up, Google Chrome, Opera 9 and up	List	Proprietary	
Visual3D Game Engine	C#/.NET			Yes	3D	Windows, Xbox 360		Proprietary	Commercial successor to open-source RealmForge engine
Visual Pinball	C++		VBScript	No	3D	Windows		MAME-like pre-0.172, then BSD, GPL	
VRAGE	C#			Yes	3D	Windows, Xbox One	Miner Wars 2081, Space Engineers,Medieval Engineers	Proprietary	Source code was released under a commercial license
Wintermute Engine	C++	2010	C-like syntax	No	2.5D	Windows	The White Chamber, Ghost in the Sheet, Dark Fall: Lost Souls, Face Noir	Donationware, MIT, LGPL	Lite version lacks 3D Actor function
World Builder		1986		No	2D	System 3	Lost Crystal	Freeware	
WorldForge	C++	1998	Lua (client), Python (server)	Yes	3D	Cross-platform		GPL	MMORPG framework made of libraries, server, client, media
XnGine				No	3D	DOS	The Terminator: Future Shock, The Terminator: SkyNET, TES 2: Daggerfall, TES Legends: Battlespire, TES Adventures: Redguard	Proprietary	
Telltale Engine and Toolset	Lua	2004	Lua	Some	3D, 2D	Windows, Xbox 360, Playstation 3,Xbox One, Playstation 4, Smartphones	Minecraft Story Mode Season 1, The Walking Dead	Proprietary	Game engine used to create story based games.
Zillions of Games		1998	Zillions Rules	No	2D	Windows		Proprietary	
Zero		1999		Yes	3D	Windows, macOS, PlayStation 3, PlayStation 2, Xbox 360, Xbox, GameCube, Nintendo DS	List	Proprietary	

== See also ==
- Physics engine
- Game engine recreation
- List of open-source video games
- List of open-source game software
- List of visual novel engines
- List of WebGL frameworks
- Role-playing game creation software
