= Gameplay =

Specific way in which players interact with a game

Gameplay is the specific way in which players interact with a game. The term applies to both video games and tabletop games. Gameplay is the connection between the player and the game, the player's overcoming of challenges, and the pattern of player behavior defined through the game's rules.

== History ==
Arising alongside video game development in the 1980s, the term gameplay was initially used solely within the context of video games, though now it is also used for tabletop games.

== Definition of term ==
There is no consensus on the precise definition of gameplay. It has been defined differently by different authors, but all definitions refer to player interaction with a game. For example:

- "The structures of player interaction with the game system and with other players in the game."
- "Gameplay here is seen as the interactive gaming process of the player with the game."

Theorists also agree that video game gameplay is distinct from graphics and audio elements.

Some theorists add more specific elements to the basic definition of gameplay as the interaction between players and games. For example:

- "One or more causally linked series of challenges in a simulated environment."
- "The experience of gameplay is one of interacting with a game design in the performance of cognitive tasks, with a variety of emotions arising from or associated with different elements of motivation, task performance and completion."
- In The Videogame Theory Reader, G. Frasca identifies three components to gameplay: "Manipulation rules" (defining what the player can do in the game), "Goal Rules" (defining the goal of the game), and "Metarules" (defining how a game can be tuned or modified).

== Types ==
A Gameplay Of 0 A.D. (video game)

Gameplay can be divided into several types. For example, cooperative gameplay involves two or more players playing together, often on a team. Below is a non-exhaustive list of various gameplay types:

- Asymmetric video game
- Cooperative video game
- Emergent gameplay
- Nonlinear gameplay

== Playability ==
Playability is a measure of the quality of gameplay. Playability represents the ease, quantity, or duration that a game can be played. Playability evaluative methods target games to improve design, while player experience evaluative methods target players to improve gaming.

Different scholars analyze playability according to different sets of criteria. For example, in Playability: analyzing user experience in video games, the researchers define playability as a set of properties that describe player experience using a specific game system: satisfaction, learning, efficiency, immersion, motivation, emotion, and socialization. However, in A video game's elements ontology, the researchers define the facets of playability as: intrinsic, mechanical, interactive, artistic, personal, and social.

== See also ==
- Game development and Game design
- Game mechanics
- Interaction design
- Play (activity)
- Time-keeping systems in games
- Video game genres

== Further reading on playability ==
- Desurvire, H., Caplan, M., & Toth, J. A. (2004). Using heuristics to evaluate the playability of games. CHI '04 extended abstracts on Human factors in computing systems, Vienna, Austria. doi:10.1145/985921.986102
- Fabricatore, C., Nussbaum, M., & Rosas, R. (2002). Playability in video games: a qualitative design model. Human-Computer Interaction, 17(4), 311–368. doi:10.1207/S15327051HCI1704_1
- Jegers, K. (2008). Investigating the Applicability of Usability and Playability Heuristics for Evaluation of Pervasive Games. Internet and Web Applications and Services, 2008. ICIW '08.
- Korhonen, H., & Koivisto, E. M. I. (2006). Playability heuristics for mobile games. In Proceedings of the 8th Conference on Human-Computer interaction with Mobile Devices and Services (Helsinki, Finland, September 12–15, 2006). MobileHCI '06, vol. 159. ACM, New York, NY, 9-16. doi:10.1145/1152215.1152218
- Korhonen H., Koivisto E.M.I. (2007). Playability Heuristics for Mobile Multi-player Games. In proceedings of the 2nd International Conference on Digital Interactive Media in Entertainment and Arts, DIMEA 2007, ACM Press (2007), pp. 28–35. Perth, Australia. doi:10.1145/1306813.1306828
- Nacke, L. (2009). From Playability to a Hierarchical Game Usability Model. In Proceedings of the 2009 Conference on Future Play on @ GDC Canada (Vancouver, British Columbia, Canada, May 12–13, 2009). FuturePlay '09. ACM, New York, NY, 11–12. doi:10.1145/1639601.1639609
- Nacke, L. E., Drachen, A., Kuikkaniemi, K., Niesenhaus, J., Korhonen, H. J., Hoogen, W. M. v. d., et al. (2009). Playability and Player Experience Research. Proceedings of DiGRA 2009: Breaking New Ground: Innovation in Games, Play, Practice and Theory, London, UK. (online slides)
- Järvinen, A., Heliö, S. and Mäyrä, F. Communication and Community in Digital Entertainment Services. Prestudy Research Report, Hypermedia Laboratory, University of Tampere, Tampere, 2002.
- González Sánchez, J. L., Zea, N. P., & Gutiérrez, F. L. (2009). From Usability to Playability: Introduction to Player-Centred Video Game Development Process. Proceedings of First International Conference, HCD 2009 (Held as Part of HCI International), San Diego, CA, US. doi:10.1007/978-3-642-02806-9_9
- González Sánchez, J. L., Zea, N. P., & Gutiérrez, F. L. (2009). Playability: How to Identify the Player Experience in a Video Game. Proceedings of INTERACT 2009: 12th IFIP TC 13 International Conference, Uppsala, Sweden, August 24–28, 2009. doi:10.1007/978-3-642-03655-2_39
- González Sánchez, J. L., Montero, F., Padilla Zea, N., Gutiérrez, F. L. "Playability as Extension of Quality in Use in Video Games". Proceedings of 2nd International Workshop on the Interplay between Usability Evaluation and Software Development (I-USED), paper number 6.Uppsala, Sweden, 24 August (2009)
- Phillips, Hubert, ed. (1957). Culbertson's Card Games Complete. Watford: Arco.
