= NScripter =

- Original author: Naoki Takahashi
- Developer: Naoki Takahashi
- Release: 1999; 27 years ago
- Written in: C++
- Operating system: Microsoft Windows
- Platform: x86
- Type: Visual novel game engine
- License: Proprietary freeware (royalty-free for dōjin/non-commercial distribution; commercial licensing fee applies)
- Website: www.nscripter.com

NScripter (エヌスクリプター) is a proprietary visual novel game engine and scripting framework for Microsoft Windows. The software was created by Naoki Takahashi and initially published in 1999. It is distributed as freeware for non-commercial and independent dōjin releases, while commercial distribution requires a royalty fee.

In Japanese video game studies and software surveys, NScripter is recognized alongside KiriKiri and HSP as a foundational middleware engine that facilitated the growth of independent PC visual novels in the late 1990s and 2000s. Independent developers used the engine for breakout titles such as Type-Moon's Tsukihime in 2000, as well as 07th Expansion's Higurashi When They Cry in 2002 and Umineko When They Cry in 2007. An independent open-source reimplementation, ONScripter, was created to run NScripter games on non-Windows operating systems.

== History ==
Naoki Takahashi originally created a predecessor tool named Scripter3 during his university studies to develop his own games, as consumer-grade game creation engines were largely nonexistent in Japan at the time. Takahashi developed NScripter primarily to support his own creative game production rather than as an intentional public middleware initiative, releasing the tool publicly as freeware alongside his independent and commercial projects in 1999. The software and its development utilities were distributed on cover-mounted CD-ROMs of Japanese personal computer gaming magazines, including the October 1999 issue of ASCII's Tech Win.

Major feature updates to the original NScripter engine ceased around 2015. In September 2015, the vulnerability advisory portal Japan Vulnerability Note reported a buffer overflow defect in the save data reading mechanism of NScripter versions prior to 3.00, prompting an update to resolve the defect. Takahashi developed a separate successor engine designated NScripter2, which was not affected by the vulnerability. In 2018, Takahashi transitioned to working as an embedded systems GUI programmer in the private sector while continuing private game development.

== Technical overview ==
NScripter was designed with an emphasis on architectural simplicity and ease of use for non-programmer scenario writers. In an industry technology report published by the Digital Content Association of Japan (DCAJ), NScripter was identified alongside KiriKiri and HSP as representative software that established the division of labor between game programmers and scenario writers in the Japanese PC adventure market. Early internal iterations of Takahashi's engine utilized assembly-like command structures, but the syntax was redesigned around the conventions of the BASIC programming language to allow writers to define dialogue, background art, character sprites, and sound playback using plain text commands. Scripts are parsed sequentially by an executable interpreter without requiring a compilation step during scenario writing. Takahashi later characterized the underlying parser as a simple, ad-hoc structure rather than a formally engineered language, which allowed him to rapidly introduce makeshift commands requested by creators (such as implementing the screen-shake command quake in a few lines of code) but lacked structured runtime abstractions. For distribution, script files can be compiled into encrypted bytecode stored as nscript.dat, while visual and audio assets are packaged into archive containers using the .sar or .nsa formats. Media scholar Mikhail Fiadotau described NScripter as a bare-bones "engine in the narrowest sense" that provided an executable interpreter without a graphical user interface, placing complete responsibility for interface design, asset pipelines, and state logic on the developer.

To keep the core codebase minimal and manageable for a solo developer, Takahashi offloaded specialized multimedia features to external plugins. Graphic handling and archive decompression relied on the Susie image viewer plugin architecture (SPI), while additional audio formats such as Ogg Vorbis were supported via dynamic-link libraries such as nsogg.dll. The original engine relied on the Win32 Graphics Device Interface (GDI) for 2D rendering, supporting sprite rendering with transparent alpha layering, background transitions, audio playback across MIDI, Wave, MP3, and CD-DA, and MPEG-1 video.

=== Architectural limitations and NScripter2 rewrite ===
As personal computer hardware capabilities advanced and visual novel production standards grew more sophisticated in the late 2000s, NScripter encountered architectural and performance bottlenecks. Takahashi noted that managing the data structures and state logic required for modern interface features—such as dedicated message backlog screens, configuration menus, and per-character voice volume sliders—proved exceedingly arduous using only NScripter's procedural control flow, which relied primarily on numeric variables and goto jumps. To address these structural limits, Takahashi introduced Lua scripting support via the nslua.dll dynamic library in 2009, offloading complex state management and UI event handling to Lua.

Furthermore, the engine's original Win32 GDI rendering architecture created processing bottlenecks as PC monitor resolutions increased beyond standard VGA/SVGA definitions; CPU-bound software blitting struggled to maintain frame rates during full-screen alpha blending and visual transitions. In response to these graphics and structural limitations, Takahashi rewrote the engine from scratch in 2012 as NScripter2, transitioning the rendering pipeline to hardware-accelerated DirectX and incorporating native Lua scripting throughout the runtime.

NScripter is distributed as freeware for non-commercial distribution and dōjin releases sold at events. Commercial releases require a licensing royalty fee of 400,000 yen per title, subject to individual price negotiations.

== Reception and use ==
=== Cultural impact and community adoption ===
In a 2015 retrospective on Japanese independent gaming for ITmedia, tech journalist Kiichi Totsuka analyzed how the late 1990s visual novel boom sparked by commercial developers Leaf and Key converged with the spread of Windows personal computers and the freeware availability of NScripter and KiriKiri. Totsuka observed that having commercial-grade scripting engines freely available enabled players inspired by commercial releases to transition directly into self-made game creators, citing Higurashi When They Cry as a prominent product of this environment.

NScripter's broad adoption was catalyzed in 2000 when the dōjin circle Type-Moon selected the engine for its breakthrough release Tsukihime. In the retrospective book Tsukihime Dokuhon, Type-Moon co-founders Takashi Takeuchi and Kinoko Nasu recalled that because their circle lacked a software engineer, NScripter's text-based scripting allowed Nasu to direct and script the scenario directly without low-level C++ development. The success of Tsukihime functioned as an influential technical proof-of-concept for the amateur community. In a 2017 interview with Dengeki Online, 07th Expansion founder Ryukishi07 explained that after his brother examined the software running Tsukihime, his brother concluded that NScripter was accessible enough for them to create a visual novel without a programmer, prompting Ryukishi07 to adapt an unproduced stage play script into Higurashi When They Cry (2002). Game scholar Akihito Inoue similarly noted that NScripter was critical in enabling an author without a software development background to successfully complete and ship a massive narrative game despite rudimentary art assets. Following Higurashi, 07th Expansion retained the engine for Umineko When They Cry (2007). Other notable commercial releases powered by the engine include Stage-nana's Narcissu series.

While NScripter provided an accessible entry point for independent circles, its technical architectural limitations prompted developers to transition to other engines as their production requirements scaled. When Type-Moon transitioned from dōjin production to commercial game development with Fate/stay night (2004), the studio migrated away from NScripter to KiriKiri and KAG in order to implement dynamic visual effects—including screen zooming, weapon sparks, camera shake, noise effects, and custom text ruby annotations—that exceeded NScripter's native capabilities.

Despite the emergence of modern 3D game engines, NScripter retained longevity within Japanese amateur development. In an empirical survey presented at the 2018 DiGRA Japan conference, Tokyo Polytechnic University researcher Takashi Imagire analyzed game engines utilized by dōjin circles exhibiting at Comiket (C92 and C93). The study documented that while 3D dōjin development had shifted overwhelmingly to Unity and Unreal Engine 4, NScripter maintained measurable active usage among 2D dōjin creators nearly two decades after its initial release, continuing alongside legacy 2D tools such as KiriKiri, RPG Maker, and DX Library.

Because official documentation provided by Takahashi was sparse, volunteer users established third-party technical websites and tutorials that assisted new creators in learning the engine. The software's licensing model also created a self-sustaining ecosystem: Takahashi made the engine free for dōjin creators to support emerging developers, and when amateur creators transitioned into commercial game studios, their commercial licensing fees funded ongoing engine development.

=== Academic and industry analysis ===
In a 2009 study published in the Journal of Digital Games Research, sociologist Nobushige Hichibe identified NScripter alongside RPG Maker as essential tools that enabled sustainable, small-scale game development in Japan. Hichibe argued that because commercial game studios required large budgets and broad demographic appeal to recoup production costs, commercial releases frequently avoided controversial or unconventional themes. In contrast, low-cost scripting engines like NScripter allowed independent creators to bypass capital barriers, enabling them to produce experimental works addressing complex societal themes such as bullying, discrimination, war, science, and religion. In a companion 2009 report for the IGDA Japan, Hichibe documented Tomo Kataoka (founder of Stage-nana, developer of the NScripter-based Narcissu series) giving a keynote lecture on NScripter's development history and the philosophical boundary separating dōjin and commercial visual novel production. In October 2008, DiGRA Japan convened an academic symposium at the University of Tokyo focusing on the cultural impact of Higurashi and Umineko, featuring Takahashi as an invited panelist alongside Ryukishi07 and academic researchers.

In a 2019 study published in the Journal of Gaming & Virtual Worlds, media scholar Mikhail Fiadotau analyzed NScripter as an instrument of video game "produsage" (user-driven game production using dedicated software). Fiadotau categorized NScripter within a two-axis typology as an example of "assisted, liberal" produsage. Its expressive freedom was classified as "assisted" because the engine automated fundamental visual novel conventions (such as branching narrative choices, sprite rendering, and audio cues) without requiring low-level C++ programming, lowering technical barriers for independent writers. Applying Ian Bogost's platform studies framework—which argues that game engines actively regulate and constrain narrative and artistic expression—Fiadotau noted that NScripter's functional architecture strictly channeled creation into a sequential 2D text-and-sprite paradigm, distinguishing it from modern, flexible general-purpose game engines. Its distribution model was classified as "liberal" because Takahashi distributed the engine as freeware, permitted unrestricted non-commercial distribution, and tolerated third-party clones, cross-platform ports (such as ONScripter), and community extensions. Fiadotau noted that tools like NScripter demonstrated the capacity of amateur communities to build open, community-supported alternatives to commercial game middleware. However, because the original engine lacked translation and was constrained by Japanese double-byte character encodings (Shift JIS), direct international adoption was hindered, prompting Western developers to rely on third-party localization forks or adopt native Python-based engines such as Ren'Py.

== Derivatives ==
Programmer Ogapee developed ONScripter, an open-source software reimplementation of NScripter written in C++ using the Simple DirectMedia Layer library. ONScripter interprets NScripter scripts and data files, allowing games to run on platforms such as Linux, macOS, Android, and iOS. The localization group insani developed ONScripter-EN as a fork of ONScripter to support English-language releases. Web-based implementations, including PNaCL ONScripter and the NscPlayer application, were also created to run NScripter games inside web browsers.
