= CraftStudio =

Collaborative voxel-based game engine

- Original author(s): Élisée Maurer
- Developer(s): Sparklin Labs
- Initial release: 12 June 2011; 14 years ago
- Final release: 1.7.6 / 29 July 2015; 9 years ago
- Operating system: Windows; macOS; Linux
- Successor: Superpowers
- Size: 9 MB
- Type: Voxel-based video games
- Website: play.craftstud.io/games/

CraftStudio is a collaborative cross-platform game engine used to create voxel-based video games, developed by Sparklin Labs.

== History ==
Developer Élisée Maurer began the funding campaign for CraftStudio on IndieGoGo in March 2011, with an early development version being offered to players. The game reached its funding goal of $16,000 in April 2012. The game entered its alpha phase of development in June 2012 and entered beta in April 2013 before being fully released in May 2015, with major updates concluding. The successor to CraftStudio is Superpowers, a collaborative HTML5 game development environment, which was fully released in July 2016. In April 2017, CraftStudios was released for free on itch.io.

== Overview ==
CraftStudio allows users to work collaboratively on projects in real-time to create voxel-based video games in both 2D and 3D, with assets stored in the cloud. The tool encompasses the entire video game development workflow, allowing users to manage models, animations, Lua scripts, and maps obtained from pre-made assets or created from scratch. Games can be published for Windows, macOS, Linux, or the web browser.

== Evolution ==
CraftStudio was used as a modelling toolkit by developer Hypixel Studios to create assets for Hytale during the game's development. Hypixel Studios then hired the developers of CraftStudio, Maurer and Nicolas Gauthier, to work on evolving CraftStudio into a unique toolkit built specifically for Hytale. This toolkit became the Hytale Model Maker, and was used to create all of the items, NPCs, and animations in the game.

== See also ==
- List of game engines
