= Buildbox =

Game development platform

- Developers: AppOnboard, Inc
- Stable release: 4.0
- Operating system: Windows 10, Windows 11, Mac OS X 10.8, Mac OS X 10.9 and OS X 10.10
- Type: Game creation system
- Website: buildbox.com

Buildbox is a no-code development platform focused on game creation without programming, coding or scripting. The core audience for the software is entrepreneurs, designers and other gaming enthusiast without prior game development or coding knowledge.

It was acquired by AppOnboard in June 2019.

Buildbox was founded by Trey Smith in August 2014 with the goal "to democratize game development and create a way for anyone to be able to create video games without having to code". It is a cross-platform development tool that can be run on both Windows Operating System and OSX. Primarily used to create mobile apps, Buildbox exports finalized games to iOS, Android, Amazon Mobile Devices, Amazon TV, Mac, PC and Steam.

The main features of Buildbox are the image drop wheel, asset bar, option bar, collision editor, scene editor, monetization options and sliders that change the physics within the game. While using Buildbox, users also get access to over 20,000 game assets, sound effects and animations.

One of the main advantages of the app is the Creator Menu where person can create the skeleton of the game. Then the user can change or edit the character or multiple characters from the character settings, edit or change environmental settings (gravity, friction) create multiple worlds and levels, create a coin system, power ups, checkpoints, change the user interface and buttons with Node Editor Menu, animate objects, create banner and video ads, export for different platforms with one click, store the source code and edit character and object components.

== Buildbox 3 ==
Buildbox 3 was released in May 2019, introducing several enhancements to the platform. This release expanded the toolkit available to developers, featuring a comprehensive tutorial aimed at novices to facilitate their learning of the platform's functionalities. Additionally, it introduced 14 smart assets and 40 new nodes, augmenting the extensive collection of resources previously available. The update to version 3.5.7 represents the latest refinement to Buildbox 3.

== Buildbox 4 ==
Buildbox 4 is the latest iteration of the Buildbox game development platform, incorporating artificial intelligence (AI) to facilitate the game design process. This version introduces AI-driven functionalities that assist users in generating game assets, scenes, and in the editing of game levels, aiming to streamline the development process.

=== Overview ===
Buildbox 4 integrates artificial intelligence to offer new capabilities in the game development workflow. Features include text-to-game translation, which allows users to describe game elements in text form that the AI then uses to create corresponding game assets. Additionally, the platform provides AI-assisted prototyping and level editing tools designed to simplify the creation of game environments and mechanics.

The update also introduces improvements to the software’s graphics engine and an expanded library of graphical assets. The interface has been updated to be more intuitive, supporting users in efficiently navigating the platform's features. By leveraging AI, Buildbox 4 seeks to reduce the technical challenges often associated with game development, making it more accessible to individuals without extensive programming or design experience.

== See also ==
- Game engine
- List of game engines
- No-code development platform
