= Wildfire Games =

Video game developer

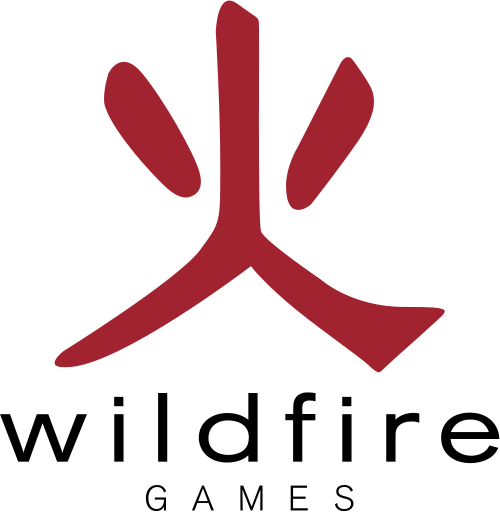
- Industry: Video games
- Predecessor: Wildfire Studios
- Founded: Early 2002
- Key people: Jason Bishop; Ken Wood; Erik Johansson
- Products: 0 A.D.; Rome at War; The Last Alliance
- Members: 18 (2021)

Wildfire Games is an independent free software video game developer, originally founded as a modding team in 2001. The logo is the Chinese character "火" (fire). Wildfire Games is currently developing 0 A.D., a real-time strategy game. In addition to game development, Wildfire Games has developed the Pyrogenesis game engine used in 0 A.D. and separate mods.

== History ==
Wildfire Games began as a game modding studio for Age of Empires II. An idea for a mod, 0 A.D., became an independent game due to the limitations of Age of Empires.

== Awards ==
- Top 100 Best Mods and Indies of 2008
