= Clonk =

- Developer: RedWolf Design / Matthes Bender
- Platforms: Windows, Linux, Mac
- Release: May 5, 2014; Clonk Rage (4.9.10.7)
- Modes: Single-player, multiplayer

Clonk is a single-player and multiplayer video game series. The games feature a mix of the action, real-time strategy, and platform game genres. Developed between 1994 and 2014 by RedWolf Design, the games of the series were originally released as shareware and became freeware and later open source software around 2008 and 2014. The game's community has since developed the series under the name OpenClonk. The series was compared and described as a mixture of Worms, The Settlers, Tetris, Lemmings and Minecraft. The game was noted for the easy game "extension" mechanic with an integrated editor and developer mode, which allows experienced players to create their own modifications directly into the game.

== Gameplay ==
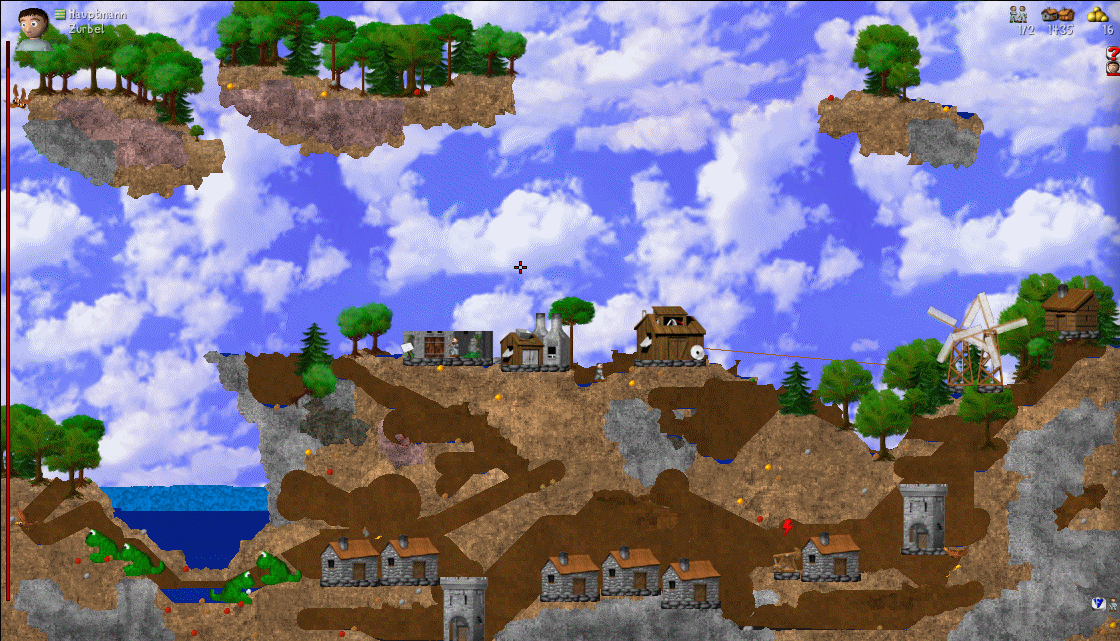
Screenshot of Clonk Endeavour

In Clonk, the player controls small, humanoid beings - the so-called Clonks - within a two-dimensional, dynamically modifiable landscape using keyboard or mouse. Clonks interact with their surrounding landscape, animals, weather, buildings and objects. The game can be played alone or in multiplayer in split-screen or via local network or Internet. Four different keyboard settings, combined with the option of using a mouse or gamepad, result in allowing up to six players on one computer. The game goal depends on the scenario being played, varying between melees, in which players fight each other, strategical team siege scenarios and cooperative missions.

=== Extensions ===
The expandability of the games is a core gameplay aspect and feature of the Clonk series. Several extensions were made over the years. There are medieval (Knights), futuristic (Hazard), fantasy and "Cowboys and Indians" (Western) themed packs available. Far worlds features the deep sea, jungle and Arctic. The Western is also an official extension.

=== Community made extensions ===
The Comprehensive Clonk Archive Network (CCAN) a hub for the Clonk community to share self-made extensions for the game. Extensions for older (freeware) versions of Clonk can be downloaded there.

== Development ==
Release timeline
1994	Clonk 1 (for PC / MS-DOS)
1994	Clonk 2 Debakel
1995	Clonk A.P.E. (Advanced Player Edition)
1996	Clonk 3 Radikal
1997
1998	Clonk 4 / Clonk World (first Windows game)
1999	Clonk Planet
2000
2001	Clonk Extreme (3D, no development, unreleased)
2001	Clonk Planet: Golden Wipf Edition (unofficial)
2002
2003
2004	Clonk Endeavour (based on Golden Wipf Edition)
2005
2006
2007
2008	Clonk Rage (cross platform)
2009
2010	OpenClonk (open-source community continuation)

Between 1994 and 1996 RedWolf Design, with the German lead developer Matthes Bender, created four Clonk games for the MS-DOS/PC platform.

In 1999 RedWolf released their first Windows Clonk game, Clonk 4 (in retail release under the name Clonk World).

=== Revival of the series ===
In 2003, RedWolf Design revived the series' 2D branch by collaborating with the GWE team and derived the next official Clonk title called Clonk Endeavour from the previous GWE 4. Clonk Endeavour received positive attention when it was presented on the Games Convention in Leipzig, and won a newcomer contest held by GIGA TV. The game was sold in the CD version for €25 and as digital download for €15.

The development continued, and several extensions such as a new network architecture for faster internet games and a fullscreen menu system were being developed. The development led to a new sequel, Clonk Rage, which became the officially current version on May 5, 2008. Its predecessor, Clonk Endeavour, was released as freeware a couple of days later.

The other 3D development branch, Clonk Extreme, progressed slowly, and in 2008 only early alpha versions, some screenshots and one preview video of the game were available. Clonk Extreme was announced with a release date in 2050, but this was later found to be an April Fools' Day joke. However, in 2009 RedWolf Design's leader Matthes Bender announced he would be working on other projects, and the Clonk Extreme development was frozen without probable continuing development.

Development of Clonk Rage continued until May 2014. In 2014 the forums of Clonk were closed, and on end-of-support of all available Clonk versions, their engine source and game content have been released under open-source licenses to the community.

Specifically, Clonk 1 to 3 Borland Turbo C++ code, Clonk Planet v4.65 and Clonk Endeavour v4.95.5 (engines only) VC6 code and Clonk Rage's current development prototype were released under the Clonk Source Code License (ISC License).

The content of all the games in the series was released under the CC BY-NC Creative Commons license, making them freely shareable and downloadable freeware.

=== OpenClonk Community continuation ===
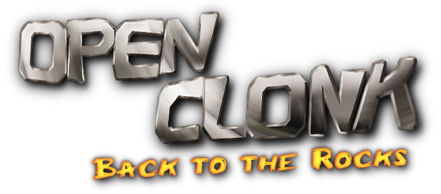
Logo of OpenClonk

OpenClonk is an open source continuation based on Clonk Rage by a community of Clonk enthusiasts and former Clonk developers. It is not officially developed by RedWolf Design.

OpenClonk is licensed under the ISC license with the content under CC BY-SA (or more permissive).

Development happens on a git repository.

== Reception ==
In 2004 Clonk Endeavour attracted some attention when it was presented on the Games Convention in Leipzig and won a newcomer contest held by GIGA TV.

In 2007 German computer magazine Computer Bild lists Clonk Planet with 4/5 stars. German gaming website gbase.de reviewed Clonk Rage in 2009 and gave it 7.5/10 points.

A Russian game magazine's review called Clonk Planet "a plotless masterpiece" comparable with Tetris and Lemmings.

The game was reviewed by several other German game magazines.

== See also ==
- OpenClonk
