= Sins of a Dark Age =

- Sins of a Dark Age logo
- Developer(s): Ironclad Games
- Publisher(s): Ironclad Games
- Engine: Iron Engine
- Platform(s): Microsoft Windows
- Genre(s): Multiplayer online battle arena, real-time strategy
- Mode(s): Multiplayer

Sins of a Dark Age was a dark fantasy multiplayer online battle arena (MOBA) video game developed by Ironclad Games, and published by Ironclad Games and Steam for Microsoft Windows operating systems. The game launched as a free to play title on Steam on May 8, 2015. The game features a comprehensive storyline set in a dark fantasy world. Sins of a Dark Age ceased further development on June 30, 2015 due to not being sustainable with its current player base, and the servers were shut down on March 30, 2016.

== See also ==
- Sins of a Solar Empire
