= OpenClonk =

Free and open-source 2D action game

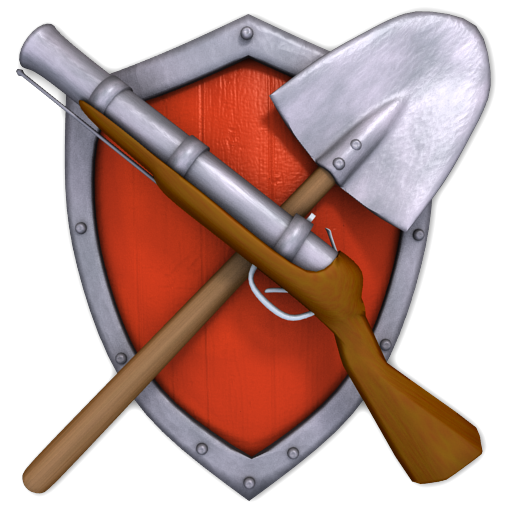
- Developer: OpenClonk Developers
- Release: 1.0 / 3 December 2010; 15 years ago
- Stable release: 8.1 / 17 March 2018; 8 years ago
- Written in: C++
- Platform: Microsoft Windows, Linux, OS X
- Type: Single-player, Multiplayer Action
- License: ISC (source code); CC BY-SA, CC BY, CC0 (game assets)
- Website: https://www.openclonk.org/
- Repository: https://git.openclonk.org/openclonk.git

OpenClonk is a free and open-source 2D multiplayer action game, in which the player controls small humanoids called "clonks". The main mechanics of the game include mining, settling, player vs player combat, and tactical gameplay. The game features a single-player and multiplayer mode, and supports cross-platform play across Microsoft Windows, Linux, and MacOS.

The OpenClonk project is a continuation of the Clonk game series and game engine, which are now discontinued. The source code is available under the ISC license and game content is licensed under CC BY-SA, CC BY and CC0.

== Gameplay ==
The player controls clonks, which can perform various tasks ranging from shoveling through dirt and throwing dynamite to mining gold, constructing buildings, and wielding swords. The game world consists of a dynamic and destructible landscape. The landscape is constructed out of different materials like earth, tunnels, sky, coal, ore, gold, and water. Players can destroy solid materials or liquids by using a variety of tools, which allows for dynamic gameplay.

Gameplay is focused on two gamemodes:

=== Settlement ===
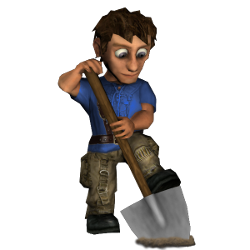
Artwork of settlement in OpenClonk

The gamemode "Settlement" can be played cooperatively, where two or more players work towards a mutual goal. In Settlement, players build settlements using in-game resources such as: wood, metal, fire, and stones. Players face challenges such as inhospitable landscapes, transporting large objects, and natural disasters. The development of Settlements allow players to construct advanced items and vehicles, which allows them to fulfil more complex tasks and achieve various goals.

Goals for settlement rounds include:

- Wealth: gain a certain amount of gold (called clunkers).
- Expansion: expand your settlement to a certain area of the landscape.
- Mining: mine a certain amount of valuables like gold or gems.
- Statue Construction: gather statue parts and construct a statue.

=== Melee ===
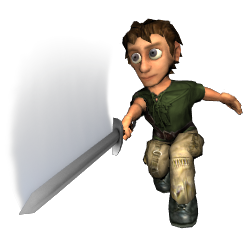
Artwork of melee in OpenClonk

The Melee gamemode is focused on the elimination of other players, which can last between 5 and 30 minutes. The player uses a single clonk to attack enemies with various weapons such as swords, bows, dynamite, grenade launchers, muskets, and catapults. Melee round goals include:

- Last Man Standing: players have a limited number of respawns and must survive as long as possible.
- Deathmatch: players must achieve a certain number of kills.
- Capture the Flag: capture enemy flags and bring them to your base to gain points.
- King of the Hill: try to defend a region as long as possible.

== Development ==
OpenClonk development began with the release of the source code of Clonk Rage in February 2009 and a later release under the ISC license in May 2009. The website www.openclonk.org was founded at the same time, acting as a portal for both development and players. The source code and game content were first hosted using a Mercurial repository, but now uses a Git repository.

The game engine is programmed in C++ and is cross-platform. The game is available on Windows, Linux and Mac OS X, and can be compiled on FreeBSD. Game content is created using the game's own scripting language C4Script, and is developed simultaneously with the game engine. Since the game content and engine are completely separate, original game content can be created by anyone using the OpenClonk engine.

Development of OpenClonk is completely open and contributions from the community are often accepted as patches.

== Releases ==
OpenClonk is being released on a regular basis with roughly a major release every year. Major releases are published when the engine or the game content has received large modifications or important features have been added. Minor releases are done for bug fixes and small updates to the game content. The current stable version is OpenClonk 8.1, released on 17 March 2018.

- OpenClonk 1.0 (3 December 2010)
  - OpenClonk 1.1 (28 December 2010)
  - OpenClonk 1.2 (12 February 2011)
- OpenClonk 2.0 (1 October 2011)
  - OpenClonk 2.1 (10 October 2011)
  - OpenClonk 2.2 (10 February 2012)
- OpenClonk 3.0 (14 October 2012)
  - OpenClonk 3.1 (15 October 2012)
  - OpenClonk 3.2 (18 November 2012)
  - OpenClonk 3.3 (10 March 2013)
- OpenClonk 4.0 (26 January 2014)
  - OpenClonk 4.1 (16 February 2014)
- OpenClonk 5.0 (5 October 2014)
- OpenClonk 6.0 (15 March 2015)
  - OpenClonk 6.1 (12 June 2015)
- OpenClonk 7.0 (16 January 2016)
- OpenClonk 8.0 (4 February 2018)
  - OpenClonk 8.1 (17 March 2018)

== Reception ==
In a popularity competition organized by the Linux Game Awards, OpenClonk received third place in the Project of the Month: March 2014. Linux Format named OpenClonk in September 2015 a "HotPick". Furthermore, on Desura in June 2015 OpenClonk achieved a 8.8/10 user rating. German computer magazine c't added OpenClonk to a DVD shipped with their magazine in April 2011.

== See also ==
- Clonk
- List of open source games
