= Timelines: Assault on America =

2013 video game

- Developer: 4Flash Interactive
- Publisher: Strategy First
- Engine: Horde3D (graphics), GLFW (OpenGL toolkit)
- Platforms: Microsoft Windows, OS X, Linux, iOS, Android
- Release: Windows, OS X, Linux; September 24, 2013 iOS, Android; February 17, 2015
- Genre: Real-time strategy
- Modes: Single-player, multiplayer

Timelines: Assault on America is a real-time strategy game set in an alternate history World War II, developed by Hungarian studio 4Flash Interactive. The game was released for Microsoft Windows, OS X, and Linux, and for iOS and Android on February 17, 2015.

== Plot ==
On July 20, 1942, the United States’ Office of Strategic Services (OSS) takes advantage of information provided to them by the underground German Resistance against the Third Reich. The OSS launch Operation ‘Wolf’s Head’, where top marksmen hide among a rally given in honor of Adolf Hitler in Berlin, Germany, assassinating him there. The OSS also sabotages multiple planes carrying high ranking Nazi officials. Afterwards, control of the Third Reich is turned over to various Nazi generals. After multiple interrogations of German Resistance members, the Nazis find out about Operation Wolf's Head. In response, they put aside their secret plans to invade the Soviet Union, and instead extend the non-aggression pact with them. Germany then conspires with the Empire of Japan to mount an amphibious two front invasion of the United States. After a successful German invasion of Cuba, as well heavy naval build-up in the Pacific by Japan, the Axis powers begin their invasion of the U.S.

== Gameplay ==
The game featured conventional campaign style missions and multiplayer functionality. The game also featured learning Artificial Intelligence, internationalization and localization, and cross-platform compatibility.

== Development ==
The game was built on the Horde3D graphics engine and GLFW on desktop platforms.

== Reception ==
The game generally received mixed industry, media, and consumer attention, Softpedia rated the game 6/10 citing controller issues and RTS mechanics flaws. ActionRadius gave the game a low rating citing a lack of intuitive user interface and a lack of strategic depth. WW2 Games HQ rated the game 7/10. Strategy First ran several promotions for the game including free additional content.
