= Horde3D =

Open-source graphics engine

- Original author(s): Nicolas Schulz
- Developer(s): The Horde3D Team
- Repository: github.com/horde3d/Horde3D
- Written in: C++
- Operating system: Microsoft Windows, Mac OS X, Linux (experimental)
- Available in: English
- Type: Graphics rendering engine
- License: EPL
- Website: www.horde3d.org

Horde3D is an open-source cross-platform graphics engine. Its purpose and design is similar to that of OGRE with the primary goal being lightweight for next-generation video games. The engine is also particularly suited for large crowd simulations. The engine is also compatible with GLFW. The major part of the graphics engine was originally written for the indie group pyropix and development is now continued at the University of Augsburg.

== Design ==
The engine is primarily designed for an object-oriented approach to scene rendering. It also features a Scene Editor that can design shaders with support for plugins including physics. The engine was originally built on top of OpenGL 2.0 A plugin to use the engine with the Bullet Physics API also exists.

== Languages ==
The engine contains a number of bindings to various languages including C#, Java, Python, Lua, Squirrel, GML (GMHorde3D)

== Games using the engine ==
The following commercial games use the Horde3D engine:

Title	Year	Developer
Offroad Legends	2012	DogByte Games
Redline Rush	2013	DogByte Games
Timelines: Assault on America	2013	4Flash Interactive
Offroad Legends 2	2014	DogByte Games
Off The Road	2018	DogByte Games
