= Felgo =

Development tool

- Initial release: December 12, 2012; 12 years ago
- Stable release: 3.5.0 / April 22, 2020
- Operating system: Microsoft Windows, macOS, Linux
- Platform: Cross-platform
- Type: Game engine
- License: Proprietary commercial software
- Website: felgo.com

Felgo (previously V-Play Engine until February 2019) is a cross-platform development tool, based on the Qt framework. It can be used to create mobile apps or games. Felgo apps and games are supported on iOS, Android, Windows Phone, embedded devices and desktop devices. Felgo developers use QML, JavaScript and C++ to create mobile apps and games.

Apps and games built with Felgo use a single code base and work across multiple platforms and screen resolutions. Felgo was founded in 2012 and is based in Vienna, Austria.

== Architecture ==
Felgo is based on the Qt (software) cross-platform development framework that provides abstraction layers for timers, threads, storage, networking and UI rendering on different platforms. Felgo uses Qt as its core and offers components and plugins on top of it, which further simplify the development of apps and games.

== Engine Features ==
=== Qt Creator IDE ===
The Qt Creator IDE supports editing QML and JavaScript code with context-sensitive help, code completion of Felgo components, navigation between components and more.

It includes a QML debugger and profiler for debugging custom components and JavaScript functions. It can inspect and change property values and QML code at runtime and is able to measure the time of element creation and binding evaluations.

=== Declarative Language Features ===
Felgo apps and games are written in JavaScript and QML, a declarative language that features property bindings, state machines or fluid animations of any property.

=== Resolution & Aspect Ratio Independence ===
Felgo is built to handle all possible aspect ratios and resolutions of modern mobile devices. Developers create their game for a logical scene using a content scaling approach.

=== Native Dialogs and Functionality ===
Felgo apps and games provide a native look and feel on all platforms. Felgo has abstracted components for displaying native input dialogs and alert boxes without the need of a single native code line.

== Felgo Game Network ==
The Felgo Game Network is a mobile-backend-as-a-service or MBaas. It allows players to compare high scores and achievements, as well as syncing their data across devices. This is a free service for players and doesn't require registration of any kind. The Felgo Game Network can be implemented in less than 50 lines of code.

== Third Party Plugins ==
Felgo apps and games support a number of 3rd party plugins. These plugins can be used by developers to monetize their applications, to gather analytics on user behavior or to engage users. The following plugins are currently supported by Felgo:

- AdMob
- Chartboost
- Facebook
- Firebase
- Google Analytics
- Flurry
- GameCenter
- Google Cloud Messaging
- HockeyApp
- Wikitude
- Soomla
- OneSignal

== Supported platforms ==
Felgo supports the following platforms.

- iOS: Version 10, iOS 11 (armv8)
- Android: Version 4.1 ("Jelly Bean") and above / armeabi-based devices (armv7, x86 architectures)
- Microsoft Windows: 32- or 64-bit Windows 7 or later
- Mac OS X: 64-bit 10.10 or later
- Linux: 32- or 64-bit
- Raspberry Pi
- i.MX: i.MX 6 series
