= Offroad Legends =

- Developer: DogByte Games
- Publisher: DogByte Games
- Engine: Horde3D
- Platforms: iOS, Android, Xperia Play
- Release: June 2012
- Genre: Racing
- Mode: Single player

Offroad Legends is a series of racing video games which utilize pseudo-3D graphics. They were released initially in 2012 for mobile platforms.

== Gameplay ==
The mechanics of the game involve off-road racing in various all-terrain vehicles. The game also features high-definition 3D graphics as a result of being built with the Horde3D engine. The underlying engine allows for vehicle and terrain deformation and also has retina display for iOS.

== Sequels ==
- Offroad Legends: Sahara: is a free-to-play sequel to the original due to its positive reception.
- Offroad Legends: Warmup: a short demo of the full game.
- Offroad Legends 2: is the latest in the series released in December 2013.

== Reception ==
The game has received fairly positive reviews since its release. Slide to Play gives the game a 3 out of 4 stating it builds off of solid mobile racing mechanics. modojo has also given the game a positive review because of its solid gameplay and well performing mechanics. PocketGamer gave a less than average review of the game stating poor level design giving the game a rating of 7/10. The game has a Metascore of 76 based on 4 critics. The game currently holds a 76.25% on GameRankings.
