= Ironclad Games =

Canadian PC game developer

- Type: Private
- Industry: Video games
- Founded: 2003
- Headquarters: Burnaby, British Columbia, Canada
- Products: Sins of a Solar Empire, Sins of a Dark Age

Ironclad Games is a Canadian PC game developer. The company was founded in 2003 by former employees of Rockstar Vancouver. Ironclad is located in Burnaby, British Columbia.

== Titles ==
Ironclad released their first game, Sins of a Solar Empire on February 4, 2008, a game that features a mix of components from real-time strategy and 4X strategy games. They released the Entrenchment expansion on February 11, 2009. The second expansion pack, Diplomacy, was released on February 9, 2010: the Sins of a Solar Empire: Trinity combination package, which included the Entrenchment and Diplomacy expansions, was also released on the same day. On February 21, 2012, they announced Sins of a Dark Age, a multiplayer online battle arena game set in a pre-war fantasy environment. A standalone expansion pack called Rebellion, was also released for Sins of a Solar Empire on June 12, 2012. In 2022 Ironclad announced Sins of a Solar Empire 2, Beta Starting October 27, 2022
