= Sins of a Solar Empire =

2008 video game

- Developer: Ironclad Games
- Publisher: Stardock
- Composer: Paul Schuegraf
- Engine: Iron Engine
- Platform: Microsoft Windows
- Release: NA: February 4, 2008; AU: March 6, 2008; EU: June 13, 2008
- Genre: Real-time strategy
- Modes: Single-player, multiplayer

Sins of a Solar Empire (Note: Often abbreviated as SoSE) is a 2008 science fiction real-time strategy 4X video game developed by Ironclad Games and published by Stardock Entertainment for Microsoft Windows operating systems. It is a real-time strategy (RTS) game that incorporates some elements from 4X games; its makers describe it as "RT4X". Players are given control of a spacefaring empire in the distant future, and are tasked with conquering star systems using military, economic and diplomatic means.

The game was released on February 4, 2008, receiving positive reviews and multiple awards from the gaming press. Its first content expansion, titled Entrenchment, was released as a download on February 25, 2009, and its second content expansion, titled Diplomacy, was released as a download on February 9, 2010. A package combining the original game with the first two expansions was released at that time, with the title Sins of a Solar Empire: Trinity. A third expansion, the stand-alone Rebellion, was released in June 2012.

A sequel to the game, Sins of a Solar Empire II, was released on Steam on August 15, 2024.

== Gameplay ==
Sins of a Solar Empire is a space-bound real-time strategy game in which players control one of three different races: the industrial TEC (Trader Emergency Coalition), the psychic Advent, or the alien Vasari. The playing field is a 3D web of planets and other celestial objects in the orbital plane of one or more stars. The game features a sandbox mode, allowing the player to choose different types of solar systems to unlock achievements. Players can conquer neighboring planets and explore distant star systems in a "massively scaled, fully 3D environment featuring entire galaxies, orbiting planets, clusters of asteroids, space dust and radiant stars." Notably, there is no single-player campaign mode, but games can be played against AI opponents offline and other players online. Ironclad Director Blair Fraser asserted that the game's Iron Engine is specially designed with technologies that allow it to handle very large differences in size, scale, and distance.

=== Resources and structures ===
Sins of a Solar Empire has three main resources to gather: Credits, Metal, and Crystal. Credits are the general currency used by the three races in the game, and are gained by completing missions, collecting bounties, creating a trade network, and taxing planets. Metal is the most common resource in the game, and is gathered by building extractors on metallic asteroids; it is used to construct basic ships and structures. Crystal is the rarest resource, which can be mined from asteroids like Metal; it is used for developing new technologies and building certain advanced ships. A Black Market feature allows players to convert unneeded Metal and Crystal into Credits or vice versa. Selling or buying too much of either resource can cause market prices to rise and fall dramatically.

Certain more intangible resources include Supply Points and Capital Ship Crews. Supply Points are used up when ships are purchased, and cannot be accumulated, acting as a population cap for the player's fleet. Capital Ship Crews and Supply Points are both required for the construction of powerful capital ships; regular capital ships require one crew, while the giant titans in the Rebellion expansion require two. A player's maximum Supply Points and Capital Ship Crews can be upgraded, but increased Supply Points require more logistical support, imposing a permanent reduction on the player's income.

Players can construct planet-based infrastructure upgrades and orbital structures on and around habitable planets that they control. Planetary upgrades grant bonuses such as higher tax incomes, better planetary bombardment resistance and access to more orbital structures. Orbital structures are divided into civilian logistical and military tactical structures. Logistical structures include asteroid mines, ship factories, trade ports, research laboratories and cultural broadcast stations. Tactical structures include orbital weapons platforms, repair centers, strike craft hangars, and superweapons unique to each playable race; for example, the TEC can build the Novalith Cannon, a giant railgun capable of bombarding distant planets.

==== Entrenchment and starbases ====
The Entrenchment micro-expansion adds new defensive options. Defensive weapon platforms and strike craft hangars gain researchable special abilities, and all factions gain the ability to deploy proximity-detonated space mines. The expansion's most notable aspect is the addition of starbases – immense defensive structures with significant firepower and various special abilities.

=== Celestial objects and anomalies ===
There are multiple types of colony-supporting planets and asteroids, with the expansions and later downloadable content increasing the available planet types over the years. Habitable worlds range from Earth-like Terran planets to frozen Ice planets and water-covered Oceanic planets, with some planets possessing random bonuses such as enhanced factories or better defenses. The player can interact directly with planets in several ways, such as creating trade routes, raining destruction from orbit or spreading "culture" via propaganda platforms, which may cause enemy planets to revolt in the player's favor. In addition, there are pirate bases, which are abnormally durable and well-defended asteroids that have no resources but provide a boost to tax income.

Furthermore, there are several different spatial anomalies (more commonly known as uncolonizable objects) found in the game which serve as obstacles and hazards to all players. These include ice and asteroid fields, which reduce weapon accuracy; gas giants, which can cause dangerous explosions if a ship is destroyed nearby; stars, which allow for interstellar jumps but have large gravity wells that are slow to traverse; and various forms of space junk, which do not affect ships directly. Wormholes link some systems, and once the necessary technology has been researched, they can be utilized for instant travel. In addition, DLCs have added traveling hazards such as plasma storms, random rebellions, economic downturns and coronal mass ejections.

Neutral forces, known as militias, guard and may own colonizable planets not occupied at the start by any of the players. Their forces are an assortment of TEC frigates, cruisers and defensive structures. They do not venture outside the gravity well, but will attack anything owned by non-militia forces that enter their gravity well. Pairs of pirate ships sometimes similarly "guard" uncolonizable gravity wells.

=== Diplomacy and bounty ===
The diplomacy options of the original game allow players to forge and break alliances and place bounties on their enemies or allies (depending on the game setting) without anybody knowing who placed it. Players can trade resources, establish trade routes between empires, manipulate the commodities market to hinder enemies by utilizing supply and demand, and issue optional "missions" to allies.

Most planets are "guarded" by neutral TEC fleets, who will attack anyone that ventures near; this is especially true for the Pirate Base planets, which are settled by pirates and are heavily fortified. In the game's start-up screen, players can also choose to enable "Pirate Raids". This mechanic allows players to anonymously place "bounty" on other players, with the goal of inducing the pirates to attack that player. The more bounty is placed on another player, then the larger the attacking fleet will be if the pirates choose to attack that player; pirate raids also gain strength over time, and to deal with them, the player has to find all the pirate bases, which are the spawn points for raids in their respective star system, and wipe them out. Pirate forces are, with one exception, TEC frigates, cruisers, orbital defense platforms, and mines (and the only exception still bears a similarity to Trader ships), but they are all unshielded, have heavier armor, often have their armament switched to autocannons, and are heavily customised with spikes and stylized holographic "Jolly Rogers". Rebellion also has voiced responses for pirate units (which can often found in the service of TEC Rebels).

Sins of a Solar Empire: Diplomacy expands upon the Diplomacy mechanic. The relations system is more visible, and players can give missions to each other, as opposed to the original's NPC-only mission issuing. Diplomatic envoy cruisers can be used to further improve relations, and the researchable pacts can significantly strengthen both sides of the alliance. The expansion also sees a noticeable increase in pirates' strength, and their bases are now outfitted with mines and TEC-issue repair platforms and strike craft hangars.

=== Tech tree and artifacts ===
In the base game, each faction has two technology trees, divided between military and civic improvements. These two trees in turn branch off into three race-specific categories. The Military tree contains upgrades to armor, shields, and weapons and unlocks units and defensive structures. The Civic tree contains upgrades to resource gathering and unlocks civic buildings, PSIDAR (Phase Signature IDentification And Ranging, which allows incoming enemy ships to be detected), planetary upgrades, diplomacy upgrades, and terraforming. In Entrenchment, several elements of both trees, as well as new elements such as starbase-related technology, are merged into the Defense tree. In Diplomacy, the diplomatic elements from the civic tree, as well as new technology that focuses on upgrading the race's diplomatic Envoy cruiser and various other bonuses, are merged into the Diplomacy tree. The Rebellion expansion grants additional unique technologies to each sub-faction of the three races.

There are many different hidden artifacts that can be found by exploring colonized planets. There are a total of nine (twelve in Entrenchment) artifacts, each giving the owner a unique and powerful bonus. For example, an alien artificial intelligence can increase economic efficiency across the player's empire, while an ion field technology can fortify planets against attack. When an artifact is discovered, all other players are notified of its location but not its type.

=== Units ===
There are five main categories of ships in the base game: capital ships, strike craft, cruisers, frigates and civilian ships.

Capital ships are large, powerful vessels and the cornerstones of any fleet; they can gain experience in combat and "level up" (to a maximum level of 10), thus unlocking new abilities. Each race has five different classes of capital ship (six in the Rebellion expansion), including battleships, support battlecruisers, colony ships, strike craft carriers and heavily armed dreadnoughts. A player's first capital ship is free, but subsequent capital ships cost large amounts of resources. In addition, each capital ship requires a large amount of Supply, and one Capital Ship Crew.

Strike craft are small, agile ships that launch in squadrons from capital ships, carrier cruisers and hangar-defense structures; they are divided into fighter and bomber classes. Fighters are strong against bombers, other fighters and frigates, while bombers are strong against cruisers, orbital structures, and capital ships. Strike craft do not require any resources to construct, and cannot travel through phase space unless carried by their mother ship.

Frigates are small, cheap and, individually, weak vessels that fill basic combat and reconnaissance roles, including long-range support, planet-bombing, and the colonization of new worlds.

Cruisers are the main muscle of an interstellar empire. Heavy cruisers provide close-range firepower, carrier cruisers provide long-range fighter support and race-specific support cruisers provide various other situational advantages. Cruisers are individually more expensive than frigates, but are smaller, faster and cheaper than capital ships. In the base game, cruisers are the only category of ship that is unavailable from the start.

Civilian ships are unarmed and, except when a certain TEC technology is researched, unarmored, making them vulnerable to enemy attack. However, they still fulfill a very important role in a players empire: construction frigates produce orbital installations like shipyards and laboratories, while trade vessels increase the player's income.

==== In expansions ====
The Entrenchment expansion adds dedicated anti-structure cruisers and starbase constructor cruisers (both helpless at anything but their task) for the TEC and Advent, and a minelayer cruiser for the Vasari. Diplomacy adds an unarmed Envoy Cruiser for each race, which can boost relations and provide benefits for other empires.

Rebellion introduces fast-attack corvettes and super-heavy titans, in addition to the aforementioned new capital ship class. Each of the six factions of Rebellion has its own unique class of corvette and titan. Corvettes are smaller, faster and weaker than regular frigates, and have different special abilities depending on the faction. Titans, by contrast, are extremely powerful and expensive, much larger than any other vessels, and capable of being leveled-up like capital ships. Only one titan can be maintained by a player at any one time. Each titan possesses unique, upgradeable abilities that can reinforce friendly fleets or weaken enemies. In addition, titan levels are persistent—if a level 10 titan is destroyed in battle, it can be rebuilt (at a significant cost) at level 10, without requiring it to repeat the leveling process.

=== Multiplayer ===
Players can engage in online multiplayer against either a single opponent or as part of a team through the game's Ironclad Online system or by setting up a LAN game. Players can set up 5-versus-5 matches where two captains draft the other eight players. Although the game does not automatically download custom maps made with the Galaxy Forge mode, players can manually choose to download maps as needed.

== Development ==
Sins of a Solar Empire was released without any form of copy protection, but a product key registered to an Impulse account was required for updates and multiplayer in the original game. The game had a development budget below one million dollars. On November 16, 2011, Sins of a Solar Empire: Trinity was made available for purchase on Steam.

=== Game engine ===
Sins of a Solar Empire's Iron Engine offers size and scale technologies that deliver large stars and planets next to comparably small orbital structures, starships and strike craft. The engine features bump mapping on planets and ships, specular lighting, dynamic fractal generation for stars and clouds, and bloom.

=== Customization ===
Sins of a Solar Empire includes various customization features, among them a level editor that allows players to generate maps for both single and multiplayer use by setting their general properties. Matches can also be recorded and watched, and the game supports custom modifications. Ironclad Games maintains a collection of user-created works of all three kinds. The developer has also released the editor used to create the game's scenarios and a set of the development tools. Through the use of this editor, the player can dictate the number of star systems in their game, the number of planets orbiting each star system, and various other options. Lastly, the game keeps track of a variety of achievements, some of which are triggered by ordinary gameplay actions (such as winning as a specific race or collecting enough resources), or by winning with voluntary restrictions (such as without building capital ships, frigates, cruisers, or strike craft).

== Expansions ==
Ironclad has released three main expansions, which are available on Ironclad's website and Stardock's digital distribution service, Impulse. In addition, the base game and the first two expansions are available in a combination package entitled Sins of a Solar Empire: Trinity. To prevent fracturing in the multiplayer community, the features of the expansion packs are only available if both competing players have the expansions installed. If not, the features are disabled for the multiplayer game.

=== Entrenchment ===
On August 29, 2008, Ironclad and Stardock announced Entrenchment. The expansion includes new weapon upgrades and defense platforms, including modular starbases. Originally scheduled for November 18, 2008, it was released on February 25, 2009.

=== Diplomacy ===
On August 26, 2009, the second expansion was announced. Diplomacy expands the diplomatic element of the game, allowing players more control over alliances and making diplomatic victory possible, as well as offering incentives for peace and cooperation including pacts which provide economic, research, and military bonuses between factions. The opponent AI, pacing and number of game scenarios are also improved. Diplomacy was released on February 9, 2010; the Sins of a Solar Empire: Trinity combination package was also released on the same day.

=== Rebellion ===
On March 1, 2011, Rebellion – the game's third expansion, and first full stand-alone expansion – was announced. Rebellion adds new Loyalist and Rebel factions to each playable race, a new capital ship for each race, new "titan" super-capital ships, and light combat corvettes, as well as unique research topics for each Rebel/Loyalist faction. Rebellion also includes an updated graphical engine. Exactly one year from the announcement, the beta was made available for pre-order customers without prior warning. Rebellion was officially released on June 12, 2012, and includes all previously released content. The expansion uses Valve's Steam to download and install updates. The British video game developer Rebellion Developments has been opposing the use of "Rebellion" in the name of the game since 2012 due to trademark law.

==== DLCs ====
Four downloadable content packs have been released for Rebellion. Forbidden Worlds was released on June 5, 2013, and adds four new planet types and new colonization options. Stellar Phenomena was released on November 6, 2013, and adds interstellar hazards such as black holes, pulsars, coronal mass ejections and neutron stars, which have various impacts on combat and exploration. Outlaw Sectors was released on June 22, 2016, and focuses on Pirates, Black Markets, and Planetary Militias - NPC factions that can assist the player in conquering their enemies. Minor Factions was released on December 17, 2018, and included 15 AI-controlled minor factions, each offering assistance and unique services to players, if diplomatic relations are established.

== Sequel ==
A sequel to the game, Sins of a Solar Empire II, was teased by Ironclad Games on September 16, 2022. The game entered early access on the Epic Games Store on October 27. The developers called the initial phase a "technical preview", promoting Ironclad's new Iron Engine. Ironclad Games added multiplayer to its early access preview in February 2023, with promises to add further factions throughout the year.

== Reception ==
Reception

Aggregate scores
Aggregator	Score
GameRankings	88%
Metacritic	87/100

Review scores
Publication	Score
Edge	8/10
Game Informer	9/10
GameSpot	9/10
GameSpy	4.5/5
GamesRadar+	9/10
IGN	8.9/10
PC Gamer (UK)	84%

Sins of a Solar Empire was awarded "Best Strategy Game of the Year 2008" by GameTrailers, and best PC Game of the Year by IGN. The game was met with positive reviews, holding an aggregate score of 88% based on 46 reviews at GameRankings, and an aggregate score of 87/100 based on 52 reviews at Metacritic.

Much praise for the game has been directed towards the game's clever blend of RTS and 4X gameplay, the seamless zoom function, and the user-friendly Empire Tree and UI. That the game was designed to play efficiently on older as well as newer PCs has garnered considerable praise. Criticism has been focused on the lack of a single-player campaign, sporadic game crashes when played online, and the potentially lengthy game-play times. Following the 1.03 patch, with increased game speeds, this problem has been slightly improved, although games with six or more players can sometimes still take four hours or more.

During the 12th Annual Interactive Achievement Awards, the Academy of Interactive Arts & Sciences nominated Sins of a Solar Empire for "Strategy/Simulation Game of the Year".

=== Sales ===
In September 2008, Stardock's CEO, Brad Wardell, stated that Sins of a Solar Empire had sold over 500,000 units, with 100,000 of those being download sales, on a development budget of less than $1,000,000. The game sold 200,000 copies in its first month of release alone. The 2012 Rebellion expansion sold over 100,000 digital copies in its first month of release, setting a Stardock sales record for digital retail.
