= 0 A.D. (video game) =

Free and open-source real-time strategy video game

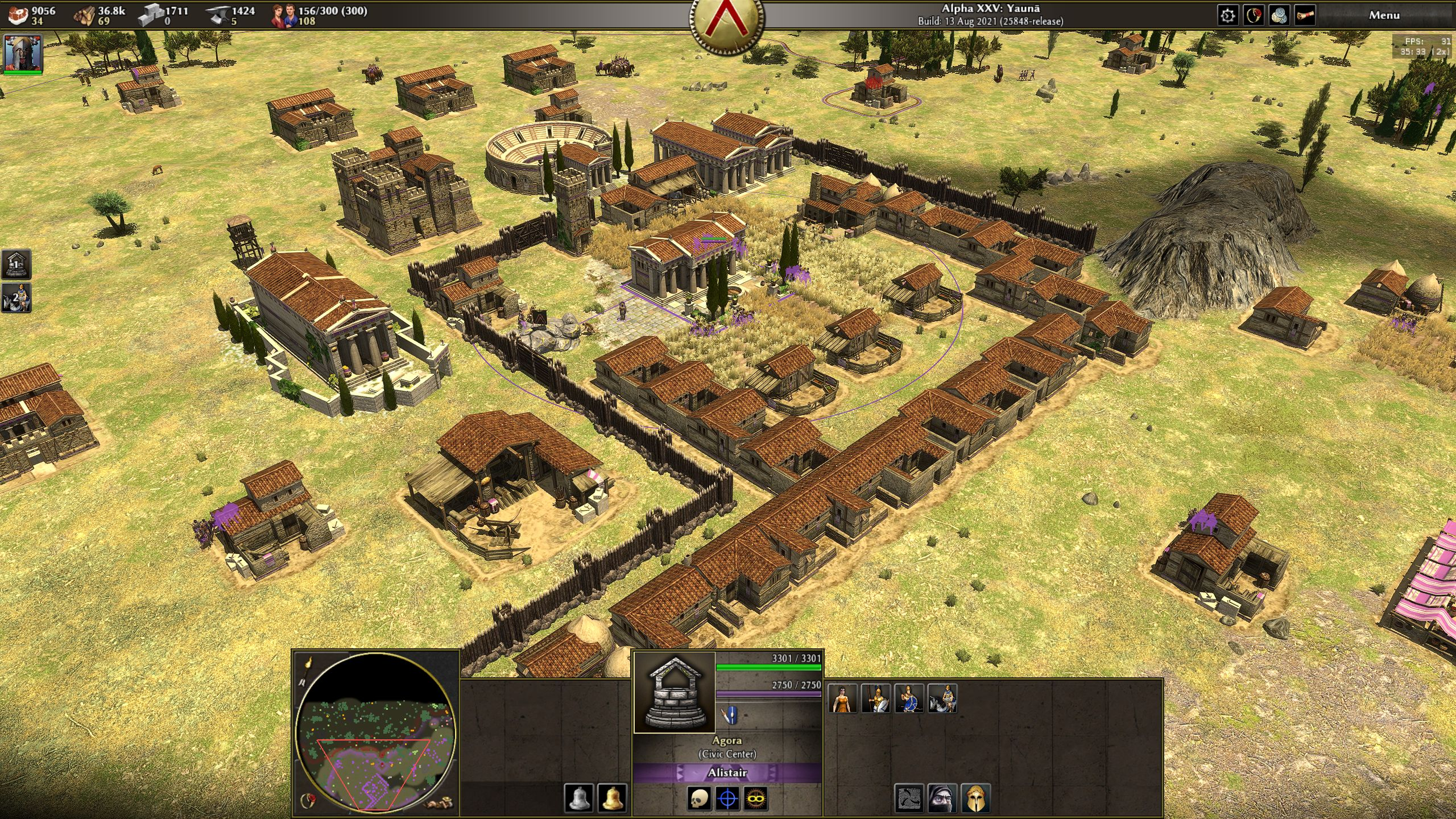
- A Spartan town (Alpha 25)
- Developer: Wildfire Games
- Release: 1 April 2010; 16 years ago
- Stable release: 0.28.0 / 18 February 2026; 8 months ago
- Written in: C++, JavaScript
- Engine: Pyrogenesis
- Operating system: FreeBSD, Linux, macOS, Microsoft Windows, OpenBSD
- Size: 1.25 GB (Download), 3.31 GB (Installed)
- Type: Real-time strategy
- License: Binaries under GPL-3.0-only; Engine and code under GPL-2.0-or-later; Resources under CC BY-SA 3.0
- Website: play0ad.com
- Repository: gitea.wildfiregames.com/0ad/0ad

0 A.D. (Note: Stylized with the 0 replaced with a sun cross) is a real-time strategy video game under development by Wildfire Games. It is a historical war and economy game focusing on the years between 500 BC and 1 BC, with the years between 1 AD and 500 AD planned to be developed in the future. The game is cross-platform, playable on Windows, macOS, Linux, FreeBSD, and OpenBSD. It is free and open-source, composed entirely of free software and free media, using the GNU GPLv2 (or later) license for the game engine source code, and the CC BY-SA license for the game art and music.

== Gameplay ==
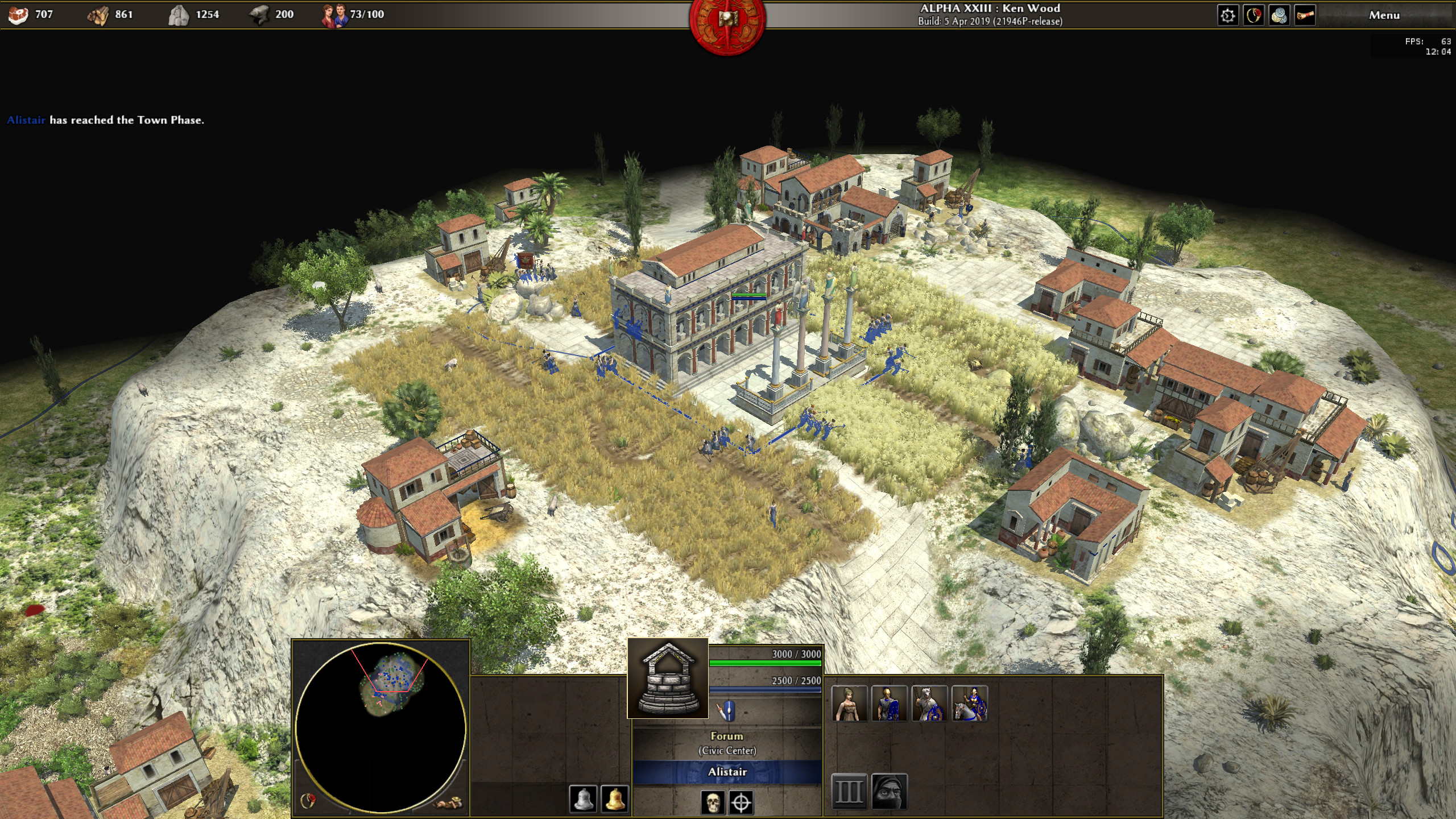
A Roman town (Alpha 23)

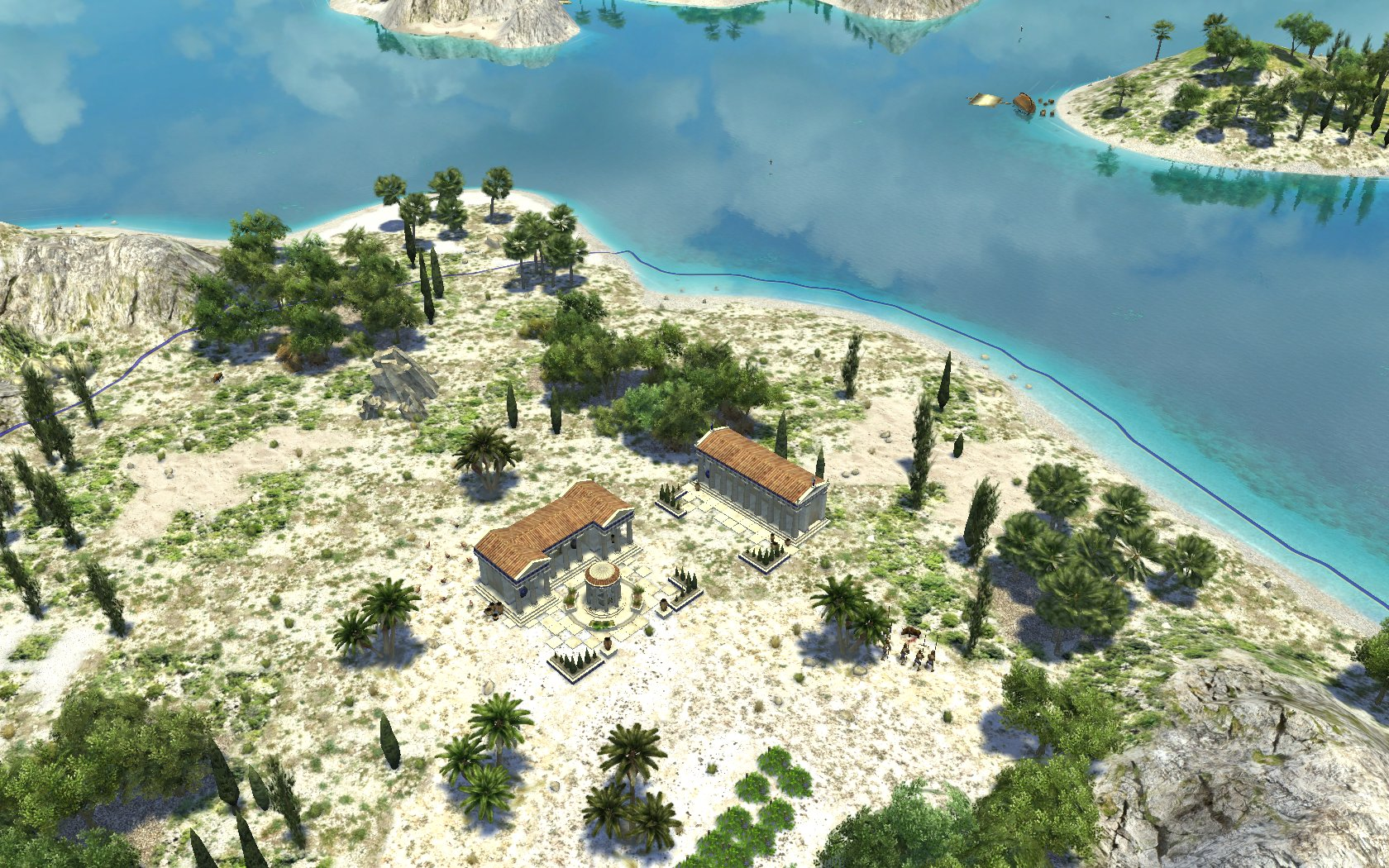
The Cycladic Archipelago island map (2012)

0 A.D. features the traditional real-time strategy gameplay components of building a base, developing an economy, training an army, engaging in combat, and researching new technologies. The game includes multiple units and buildings specific to each civilization as well as both land and naval units.

During the game, the player advances from "village phase", to "town phase", to "city phase". The phases represent the sizes of settlements in history, and every phase unlocks new units, buildings, and technologies.

Multiplayer functionality is implemented using peer-to-peer networking, without a central server.

== Development ==
0 A.D. originated in 2001 as a comprehensive total conversion mod concept for Age of Empires II: The Age of Kings. The development team later decided that making the project as a mod was too limiting to their creative freedom, and elected to move their art and ideas to an in-house engine, making it a standalone game. Matei Zaharia was a noted member of the team.

The historical accuracy of game elements has been the highest development priority. Unit and building names are shown in the original language of the civilization they belong to, and they are also translated into the language in which the user is playing the game. There is also a strong focus on attempting to provide high visual accuracy of unit armor, weapons, and buildings.

On 10 July 2009, Wildfire Games released the source code for 0 A.D. under the GNU GPLv2 (or later) license, and made the artwork available under the CC BY-SA license.

There were around ten to fifteen people working on 0 A.D. around 23 March 2010; since development started, over 100 people have contributed to the project. On 5 September 2013, a crowdfunding campaign was started on Indiegogo with a US$160,000 goal. They raised a total of US$33,251 to be used to hire a programmer. The majority of the project's finances are managed by the Software in the Public Interest organization. There is no official release date set for the finished version of the game.

Let's Play video of the game (2016)

The composers of the music in the game are Omri Lahav, Jeff Willet, Mike Skalandunas, and Shlomi Nogay. A 26-track soundtrack was released on 8 June 2018.

On 18 February 2026, Wildfire Games released version 28 "Boiorix", the first version released without an "alpha" label.

== Reception ==
In 2012, 0 A.D. received second place in the IndieDB Player's Choice Upcoming Indie Game of the Year competition. 0 A.D. has been generally well received. It was voted as LinuxQuestions.org "Open Source Game of the Year for 2013". It was also listed as one of the best open source video games by The Gamer.

== See also ==
- Free and open source software
- Linux gaming
- List of free and open-source software packages
- List of open source games
- Year zero
