= Pallett =

Pallett may refer to:

- Alyssa Nicole Pallett (born 1985), the former owner of New York vintage store, "The Sweet Ones"
- David Pallett (born 1990), English professional darts player
- George Pallett (1907–1996), English athlete
- Henry Pallett (1863–1917), English cricketer
- John Pallett (1921–1985), Canadian lawyer and politician
- Owen Pallett (born 1979), Canadian composer, violinist, keyboardist, and vocalist
- Roxanne Pallett (born 1982), British actress, played Jo Sugden in ITV soap opera Emmerdale
- Sarah Pallett, New Zealand politician

== See also ==
- Paillet
- Palette (disambiguation)
- Pallet
- Pallot (disambiguation)
- Pellet (disambiguation)
- Pollet
