= Pallet (disambiguation) =

A pallet is a portable platform used in the transportation of goods.

Pallet may also refer to:

== Transportation ==
- Pallet inverter, a machine that is used to turn over pallets
- Pallet jack, a tool used to lift and move pallets
- Pallet racking, material handling storage aid system
- Pallet Rack Mover, a device that makes it possible to move pallet racks
- Palletizer, a machine for placing materials onto pallets

== Technology ==
- Pallet fork, an integral component of the lever escapement of a typical mechanical watch
- Pin-pallet escapement, an inexpensive, less accurate version of the lever escapement
- Pallet, a GUI for the software MacPorts
- Pallets, an organization maintaining several projects in the Python programming language, including Flask and Jinja

== Other uses ==
- Pallet, a diminutive of Pale (heraldry)
- Pallet, a case of bottled water (colloquial)
- Pallet (shelter), tiny home system by a social benefit company
- Pallet (furniture), a bed that is made of straw or is of a makeshift nature
- Pallet crafts, art projects using discarded wooden pallets

== See also ==
- Palette (disambiguation)
- Palate, roof of mouth
- Pellet, small particle typically created by compressing material
