= Genma =

Genma (Japanese: げんま) may refer to:

== Literature ==
- Genma Taisen (幻魔大戦), a science fiction manga series that began in 1967

== Characters ==
- Genma (Onimusha), recurring enemies and race of monsters in the Onimusha video game series
- Genma (Ranma ½) (早乙女 玄馬), a character in the anime and manga series Ranma ½
- Genma, a character in the Battle Arena Toshinden fighting game series
- Himuro Genma, the main villain from the Ninja Scroll movie
- Genma Shiranui, a character in the anime and manga series Naruto
- Genma Kannagi, a character in the light novel and anime series Kaze no Stigma
