= Standard RPG System =

Role-playing game system

The Standard RPG System (SRS for short) is a Japanese role-playing game system developed by FarEast Amusement Research and used in Alshard, Tenra War, Kaze no Stigma RPG, Shinkyoku Sōkai Polyphonica RPG and so on. The newest, the 14th game that use SRS are the Full Metal Panic! RPG based upon the anime and light novels of the same title. SRS games are published by several companies such as Game Field, Softbank Creative, JIVE and Kadokawa(Former Enterbrain and Fujimi Shobo).

Standard RPG System is available under an open content license for non-commercial uses.

== Core mechanic ==
Standard RPG System uses only 6-sided dice. To determine whether the action is successful or not the player rolls only 2d6, if the total of the dice rolled by the player and ability/class adjustments is more than or equal to difficulty score the action succeeds. To determine damage the player rolls a number of 6-sided dice. The number of dice that are rolled increases with various class abilities.

Players choose up to three character classes during character creation - for example, fighter/fighter/fighter (a 3rd-level fighter), valkyrie/valkyrie/scout (a 2nd-level valkyrie/1st-level scout), or black magician/white mage/wizard (a 1st-level black magician/1st-level white mage/1st-level wizard).

There are 6 attributes: Tairyoku "Strength", Hansha "Reflexes", Chikaku "Perception", Richi "Reason", Ishi "Will" and Kouun "Luck". In Tenra War, Tenka, representing social ability, is present instead of Kouun. Characters' attributes are decided by the selection of classes almost automatically. Attribute scores also determine the eight combat ability scores.

== Scene system ==
The game session is proceeded under the "Scene system" and divided into 4 phases: opening phase, middle phase, climax phase and ending phase. In the opening phase, player characters (PCs) get into the incident with each one having a motivation such as business, adventure, curiosity and romantic feeling for the heroine. PCs do not need to make up a party in this phase. In the middle phase, the PCs get together. And they fight against creatures and research the incident. In the climax phase, the boss enemy appears as the arch-foe against PCs. The ending phase is the phase for the epilogue. Each phase is also divided into several scenes. The Game Master(GM) chooses a scene player as the scene's protagonist. If the GM allows and the player succeed in an Appear roll, other PCs can appear on the scene as well.

== Breakthrough systems ==
Each SRS game have a different "Breakthrough system" work much like hero points.

In Alshard and Alshard Gaia, characters possess supreme divine powers according to their classes. For example, fighters possess the power of 'Thor', which adds extra damage to damage rolls, while white mages possess the power of 'Idun', which can raise the dead. Supreme divine powers are named Kago (加護, lit. divine protection). Each character can use Kago three times every a session, according to the three classes chosen during character creation.

In Tenra War, its Breakthrough system is called Gou system (業システム, lit. karma system). Player characters earn Aiki (合気, lit. harmonious spirit) points by good roleplaying in the sessions. Aiki points can be transferred into Kiai (気合, lit. fighting spirit or willpower) points work much like costs for more powerful abilities.

Player characters in Kaze no Stigma RPG and Shinkyoku Sōkai Polyphonica RPG can use Kizuna Kouka (絆効果, lit. bonds effect) depends on their human relationships.

Trinity x Venus SRS is based upon the superhero manga of the same title. Player Characters are the users of supernatural abilities called V.I.P. abilities. Trinity x Venus SRS's breakthrough system is named Advanced V.I.P. system, PCs (player characters) can use customizable supernatural abilities.

== Games that use SRS ==
- Alshard ff
- Alshard Gaia
- Tenra War
- Kaze no Stigma RPG
- Shinkyoku Sōkai Polyphonica RPG
- Trinity x Venus SRS
- Magician's Academy RPG
- Tenka Ryoran RPG
- Sekaiju no Meikyu SRS
- Monotone Museum
- Alshard Savior RPG
- Metallic Guardian RPG
- Twilight Gunsmoke
- Full Metal Panic! RPG
- The Age of the Galaxy
