= Alshard =

Tabletop role-playing game

- Alshard fortissimo cover
- Designers: Jun'ichi Inoue, F.E.A.R.
- Publishers: Enterbrain, Game Field
- Publication: 2002 (1st edition); 2005 fortissimo (v.1.5)
- Genres: techno-fantasy
- Systems: Standard RPG System
- Website: http://www.fear.co.jp/

Alshard (アルシャード) is a Japanese role-playing game designed by Jun'ichi Inoue and Fareast Amusement Research. It was released in July 2002. The current, version 1.5, known as Alshard fortissimo or Alshard ff (アルシャードフォルティッシモ,アルシャードff) was published in July 2005. It is a fantasy role-playing game with mechanical items like Final Fantasy. The game system is named Standard RPG System (SRS for short) and is used in other games such as Tenera War and Kaze no Stigma RPG and so on. SRS including this series is one of the largest role-playing game systems published in Japan.

== Setting ==
Alshard's world is named Midgard, and the setting includes many deities from Norse mythology (for example 'Odin' and 'Thor'), but most of the deities died in Ragnarök, the ancient war of the gods. Midgard is a fantasy world, but guns, motorcycles, robots, androids, airships, tanks, and other mechanical items are present in the setting. Player characters are called "Questers" and possess a crystal (called a "Shard") of ancient gods, and can use supreme divine powers by using it. Questers seek an ideal world, Asgard, and stand against the world's enemy, the abyss, and the evil empire Wahres Reich (German for the True Empire). The game title, Alshard is a coined term that means "a Shard with complete power." Every Shard has ego and tries to guide the owner to Asgard.

=== Midgard and Wahres Reich ===
Midgard is about as large as Eurasian Continent in the actual world. More than 70 percent of it is occupied by Wahres Reich. Wahres Reich is a theocratic empire which worships the god of machinery, Deus Ex Machina. Imperial science technology called Kabbalah are well-developed. However, in contrast to other technology systems such as ancient race Alf's "Relics" and desert tribe Jarhead's "Gears", Kabbalah wastes mana of world and increases the abyss which is the enemy of world. Wise men and Questers in Midgard hate the abyss and blame Wahres Reich for using dangerous Kabbalah technology. Also the empire looks on Questers as imperial enemies and is hunting Questers for their Shards possess enormous power according to imperial proclamation.

By Kabbalah technology, Reich's army possesses many modern weapons including tanks and airships, and is the strongest military force in Midgard. The same person holds posts as the Kaiser and the Pope in this theocratic state. The present Kaiser, Gustav Joseph II, is a very taciturn and incredibly old man at the age of 412 years. It would be a large incident if he said just one word. The line of Kaisers born in the monogenesis from the women who were called Blessed Virgin. To prevent the accident, several clones of Blessed Virgin are made, but subjects of Reich are not told the truth. Some propagandas tell that these clones are twins. These tragic Blessed Virgins appear in early scenarios as beautiful and innocent heroines whom questers should help.

The empire has more than 10 big arcology cities as representative by imperial capital Gladsheim in the empery. Arcology cities are structured of complex skyscraper and they are in the frontier of Reich's science power. Future scientific equipment, including air cars can exist only in the cities where the power of Shard was applied. The urbiculture of the cities are developed and is very different from the outside fantasy world, PCs can play cyberpunk adventures in there.

The imperial overstretch of Wahres Reich cause frictions and strained relations with other nations as follows.

- Westri - A kingdom that was ruined by the invasion of Wahres Reich and the riot of hundreds of mad robots. The crown princess is missing.
- Silvestri - A republic that was built after a revolution, like the French First Republic.
- Kirsche - A former principality under the Westri. It is an armed neutral country.
- Yashima - An eastern empire of samurai and ninja. Yashima is one of the names used to describe ancient Japan. (See also Names of Japan)
- Zoanesheim - The kingdom of the catlike Lynx people in the Golden Forest.
- Vanaheim - The maritime kingdom of the merrow, a legal entity of Wahres Reich. The king is treated as a president of the company under Reich's law.
- Among - The lizard-folk's subterranean empire.

=== Organizations in Midgard ===
- Excalibur - The knights of the round table whose foe is the abyss. The airship named Avalon is their movable military base.
- Primrose - The resistance against Wahres Reich. The leaders are Hans Wilmar and his sister Sophie. They are named after Hans Scholl and Sophie Scholl, the leaders of the actual White Rose resistance.
- Norn - A guild of monster hunters. There are three sections named Urd, Verdandi and Skuld.
- Academy - A magic academy built by ancient race known as the Alf on floating islands. The alumni are called Wizards and respected as elite magicians.
- General Material (G=M) - The transport company which helps the resistance movement and prevents Reich's invasion. Jormungand is G=M's rival company.
- Aegis - The defenders of the world. The members wear metal armor, and are called Runeknights. Aegis and Excalibur are rivals.
- Silber Kreuz (SK) - One of the special forces of Wahres Reich. SK is the Imperial Guard. Schwarz Kreuz (Agents of the Cardinal), Virtues (Militia of the religious order), Kaiser Schwert (Kaiser's military police) and others are also imperial special forces.
- Wincaster Fortune Service (WFS) - The information company that sells "the future". WFS helps adventurers and stands against the abyss. WFS is in fact a sect of Excalibur.

=== Races in Midgard ===
- Alf - An ancient race that had great technology and created deities and Valkyries. The crystals named receptor are buried on their foreheads. They can control ancient scientific devices called relics including orbital weaponry, laser sword and deflector shield by using receptors.
  - Fomor - A race of dark Alf polluted by the abyss.
- Valkyrie - Armored gynoids made by Alfs are also considered one of the intelligent races. Every Valkyrie has weapon system called the Weapons Administration Retractability System (W.A.R.S. for short) including railgun, Gatling gun and particle projection cannon.
- Lynx - A race of bipedal catpeople have cat-like ears, eyes and a tail. Despite their capriciousness, they are good hunters. They have skills of arcane archery, tribal magic or martial arts.
- Dvergr - Dwarves live as air raiders and good blacksmiths. They love alcohol and Rock'n Roll music very much.
- Sirius - A race of shapeshifter change into wolves. They live as nomad. Their culture is similar to Tibetan's one. All of them are both strong martial artists and judicious philosophers.
- Jarhead - In a precise sense, it's not a non-human race but a unique tribe living in a desert. Jarhead's people regardless of gender always wear masks and protective suits from head to foot according to their religious law. They have firearms technologies called Gears. Jarhead's setting bears some resemblance to Desert Punk's.

=== Cosmology ===
Cosmology of Alshard is called Yggdrasil universe and described as the world tree Yggdrasil. Many worlds are connected by Yggdrasil like as branches and leaves of the tree. Several major worlds (including Midgard and Blue Sphere) are called "root worlds". Minor worlds and parallel universes of root worlds are called "leaf worlds". The abyss that try to change everything into void is similar to the disease of the tree that blights leaves and roots.

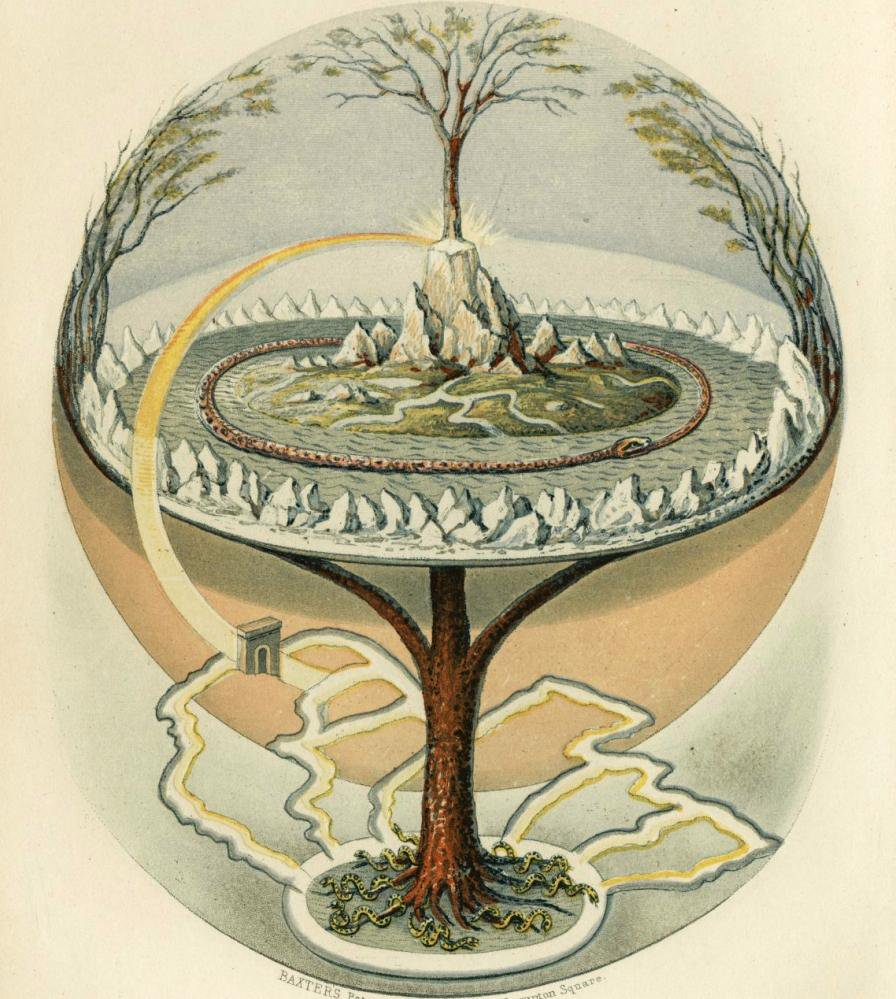
Alshard's cosmology is modeled on Yggdrasil.

Yggdrasil universe includes many worlds as follow.

- Midgard - The standard stage of Alshard. The central world of Yggdrasil universe.
- Blue Sphere - The standard stage of Alshard Gaia. An alternate Earth. Although the existence of magic is concealed from public knowledge in this world, the magic-integrated technology called Alchemy is well-developed in secret.
  - Another Sphere - One of the parallel worlds (leaf worlds) of the Blue Sphere. The existence of magic is well known in this world. Magic and magicians are administrated under laws by all the U.N. member countries.
  - Hero's Sphere - One of the parallel worlds (leaf worlds) of the Blue Sphere. The existence of magic is disbelieved and negated in this world. All Questers are considered as superheroes.
  - Sanc Crimson - One of the parallel worlds (leaf worlds) of the Blue Sphere. In this world, Jupiter became a fixed star and the homeland of mankind is Mars instead of Earth. Sanc Crimson is a garrison kingdom dominated by a cruel Queen polluted by the abyss. It invaded and annihilated five worlds already.
- Utgard - It is also treated as one of the root worlds although in fact, it is Alf's flying battleship as huge as a continent that is traveling across dimensions to avoid the abyss. Most Alfs entered into artificial hibernation in the ship.
- Hades and Helheim - Two netherworlds, Hades's inhabitants are deaths and Helheim's are demons.
- No Future - A cyberpunk world which was devastated by worldwide disasters.
- Twilight world - A fantasy world whose inhabitants have faith in the God of monotheism. The setting bears a remarkable resemblance to Blade of Arcana's.
- 10th TERRA - The world of Tenra War, Tenra bansho and Terra the Gunslinger.
- Energy planes - Several energy planes (equivalent to non-material planes) are known such as Seireikai (精霊界, lit. elemental plane), Mugenkyou (夢幻郷, lit. dreamland) and several Youseikyou (妖精郷, lit. fairylands).
- Asgard - The ultimate ideal world that Questers are seeking.

== Alshard GAIA ==
Alshard GAIA
- Alshard GAIA cover
- Designers: Jun'ichi Inoue, Takeshi Kikuchi, F.E.A.R.
- Publishers: Enterbrain, Game Field
- Publication: 2006
- Genres: contemporary fantasy
- Systems: Standard RPG System

Alshard GAIA (アルシャードガイア) is a contemporary fantasy role-playing game using the Standard RPG System which was released in August 2006. Alshard GAIA has high degree of compatibility with Alshard, it is possible to use classes of two games together.

GAIA's world is named Blue Sphere. It is an alternate Earth. There is magic, but it is concealed from public knowledge; it is united magic with science in Alchemy, a highly developed process; for instance, the magic device named Chamber staff strengthens magic with magical bullets.

Blue Sphere is invaded by the abyss that it is the enemy of Questers.

The game presents a starting character with the choice of various classes: returner (time traveler), homunculus (artificial humanoid), psychic, overlander (plane-shifter), dhampir, machinehead (animate machine like as Transformers) and intelligent weapon (including Chamber staff) etc. The setting is inspired by recent Japanese games, novels and animations, including Fate/stay night, Lyrical Nanoha and Haruhi Suzumiya series.

== System ==
Standard RPG System uses only 6 sided dice. To determine whether the action is successful or not the player rolls only 2d6, if the total of the dice rolled by the player and ability/class adjustments is more than or equal to difficulty score the action succeeds. To determine damage the player rolls a number of 6 sided dice. The number of dice that are rolled increases with various class abilities.

=== Character classes ===
Players choose up to three classes during character creation—for example, fighter/fighter/fighter (a 3rd-level fighter), valkyrie/valkyrie/scout (a 2nd-level valkyrie/1st-level scout), or black magician/white mage/wizard (a 1st-level black magician/1st-level white mage/1st-level wizard).

4 base classes (fighter, scout, black magician and white mage) have important core abilities. Therefore, player characters are encouraged to choose at least one basic class.

Sub-classes are the classes that have not only abilities but also various cultural backgrounds. Sub-classes represent ethnos, memberships of organizations, schools of magic and lifestyles.

Non-human race characters are represented by racial classes. These classes provide the unique racial abilities, magics, items and martial arts.

Overlander and overlander-alternative classes represent plane-shifters who came from various worlds in Yggdrasil universe.

Advanced classes and Einheriere classes are the special classes for high-level characters. Einheriere characters gain immortality.

At this time there are more over 70 character classes and about 2,800 class abilities. In Standard RPG System, all spells and skills are comprised in class abilities.

Unique classes in Alshard

- Valkyrie - Racial class. A female-type battle android (robot) (gynoid) similar to KOS-MOS (of Xenosaga).
- Panzer ritter - Sub-class. Knight that rides a motorcycle (called Panzer in Midgard) instead of a horse.
- Soldat - Sub-class. Cyborg soldier of Reich's army.
- Sorcerer aka Zauberer - Sub-class. The User of techno-sorcery by operating Kabbalistic computer named Sephirot.
- Alias - Sub-class. Human clone made by divine powers of Deus Ex Machina. He/She serves the aristocrat and acts as an espionage agent with military uniform of the butler/housemaid style.

=== Kago, divine protections ===
The characters' ability scores are decided by the selection of classes almost automatically. Moreover, characters possess supreme divine powers according to their classes. For example, fighters possess the power of 'Thor', which adds extra damage to damage rolls, while white mages possess the power of 'Idun', which can raise the dead. Supreme divine powers are named Kago (加護; lit. divine protection), and work much like hero points. Each character can use Kago three times every a session, according to three classes was chosen during character creation.

== See also ==
- Standard RPG System
- Tenra War
- Kaze no Stigma RPG
