= Louis Legrand =

French artist

Louis Auguste Mathieu Legrand
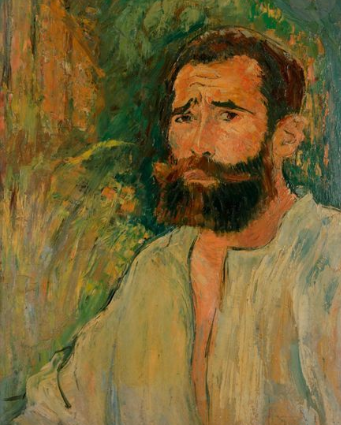
- Louis Legrand auto portrait
- Born: 29 September 1863; Dijon, France
- Died: 1951 (aged 87–88)
- Known for: aquatint engraving, painting
- Notable work: "Prostitution", "Naturalism"
- Movement: Erotic art, post-Impressionism
- Awards: Légion d'honneur
- Patrons: Gustave Pellet

Louis Auguste Mathieu Legrand (29 September 1863 – 1951) was a French artist, known especially for his aquatint engravings, which were sometimes erotic. He was awarded the Légion d'honneur for his work in 1906.

== Life ==
Legrand was born in the city of Dijon in the east of France. He worked as a bank clerk before deciding to study art part-time at Dijon's Ecole des Beaux-Arts. He won the Devosge prize at the school in 1883. In 1884 Legrand studied engraving under the Belgian printmaker Félicien Rops.

Legrand's artworks include etchings, graphic art and paintings. His paintings featured Parisian social life. Many were of prostitutes, dancers and bar scenes, which featured a sense of eroticism. According to the Hope Gallery, "Louis Legrand is simply one of France's finest early twentieth century masters of etching." His black and white etchings especially provide a sense of decadence; they have been compared to those of Henri de Toulouse-Lautrec, though his drawings of the Moulin Rouge, the can-can dance and the young women of Montmartre preceded Toulouse-Lautrec's paintings of similar scenes. He made over three hundred prints of the night life of Paris. They demonstrate "his remarkable powers of observation and are executed with great skill, delicacy, and an ironic sense of humor that pervades them all."

Two of his satirical artworks caused him to be tried for obscenity. The first, "Prostitution" was a symbolic drawing which depicted a naked girl being grasped by a dark monster which had the face of an old woman and claws on its hands; the second, "Naturalism", showed the French novelist Émile Zola minutely studying the thighs of a woman with a magnifying glass. Defended by his friend the lawyer Eugène Rodrigues-Henriques (1853–1928), he was found not guilty in the lower court, but was convicted in the appeal court and then given a short prison sentence for refusing to pay his fine.

Legrand was made famous by his colour illustrations for Gil Blas magazine's coverage of the can-can, with text by Rodrigues (who wrote under the pseudonym Erastene Ramiro). It was a tremendous success, with an exceptional quantity of 60,000 copies of the magazine being printed and instantly sold out in 1891.

In 1892, at the instigation of the publishing house Dentu, Legrand made a set of etchings of his Gil Blas illustrations. The etchings were published in a book, Le Cours de Danse Fin de Siecle (The End of the Century Dance Classes).

Legrand took a holiday in Brittany, which inspired him to engrave a set of fourteen lithographs of simple country life called Au Cap de la Chevre (On Goat Promontory). It was published by Gustave Pellet who became a close friend of Legrand's. Pellet eventually published a total of 300 etchings by Legrand, who was his first artist; he also published Toulouse-Lautrec and Félicien Rops among others.

He did not only work in graphics; he exhibited paintings at the Paris salon of the Société Nationale des Beaux-Arts starting in 1902. In 1906 he was made a chevalier of the Légion d'honneur.

Legrand died in obscurity in 1951. A retrospective exhibition was held at the Félicien Rops museum in Namur, Belgium in 2006 to celebrate his graphic art. The art collector Victor Arwas published a catalogue raisonné for the occasion.

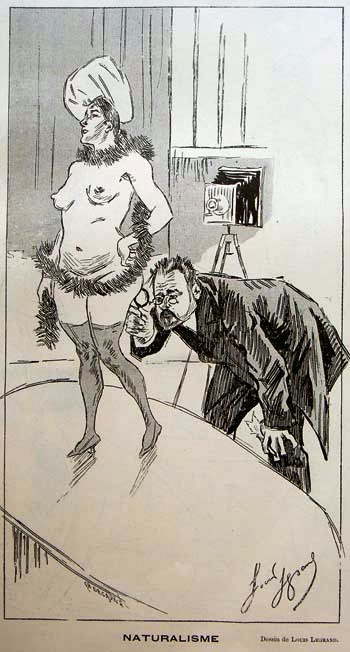
"Naturalism", 1890

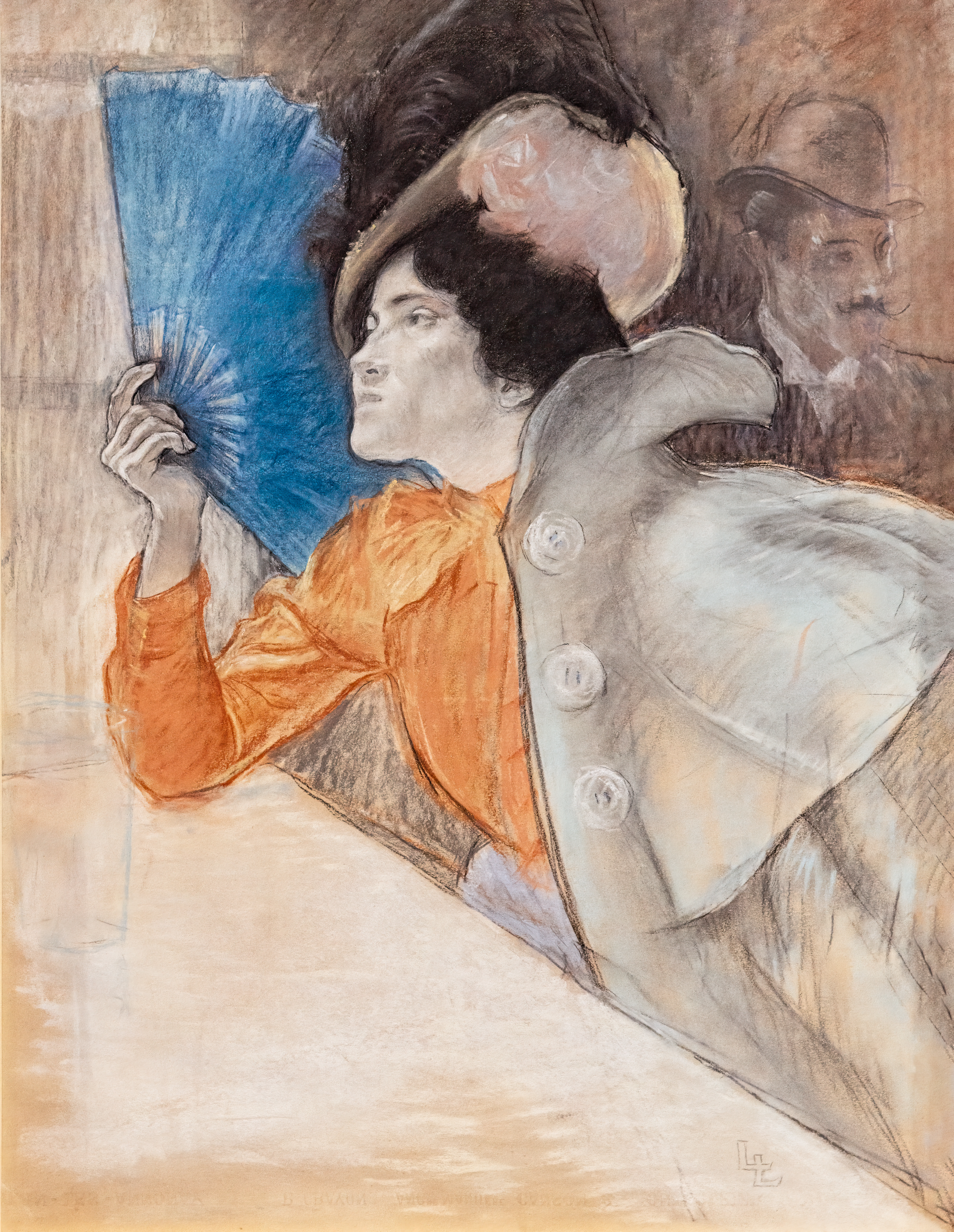
Elégante à l'éventail, c. 1900

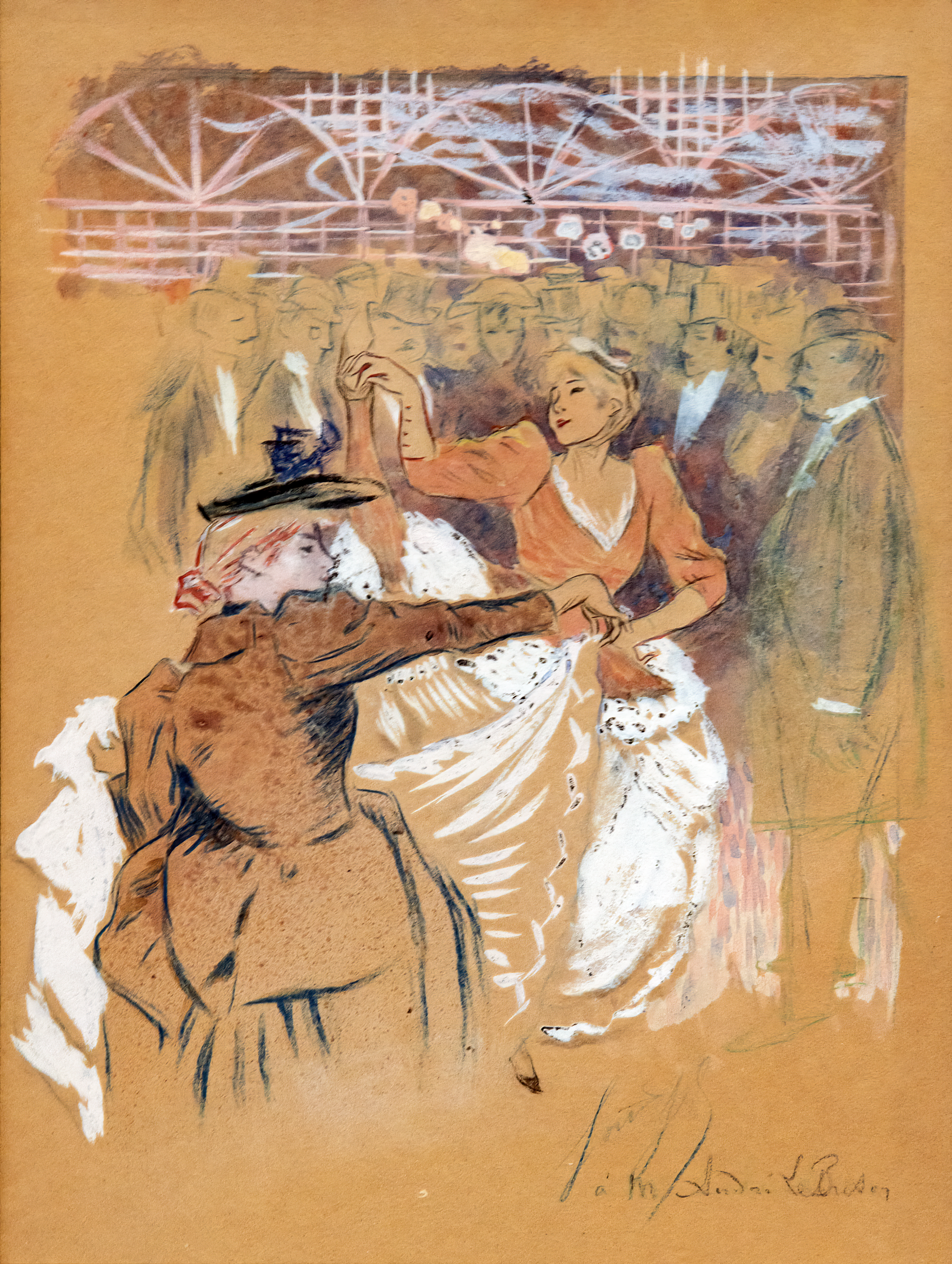
Le Cancan au bal Bullier, c. 1895

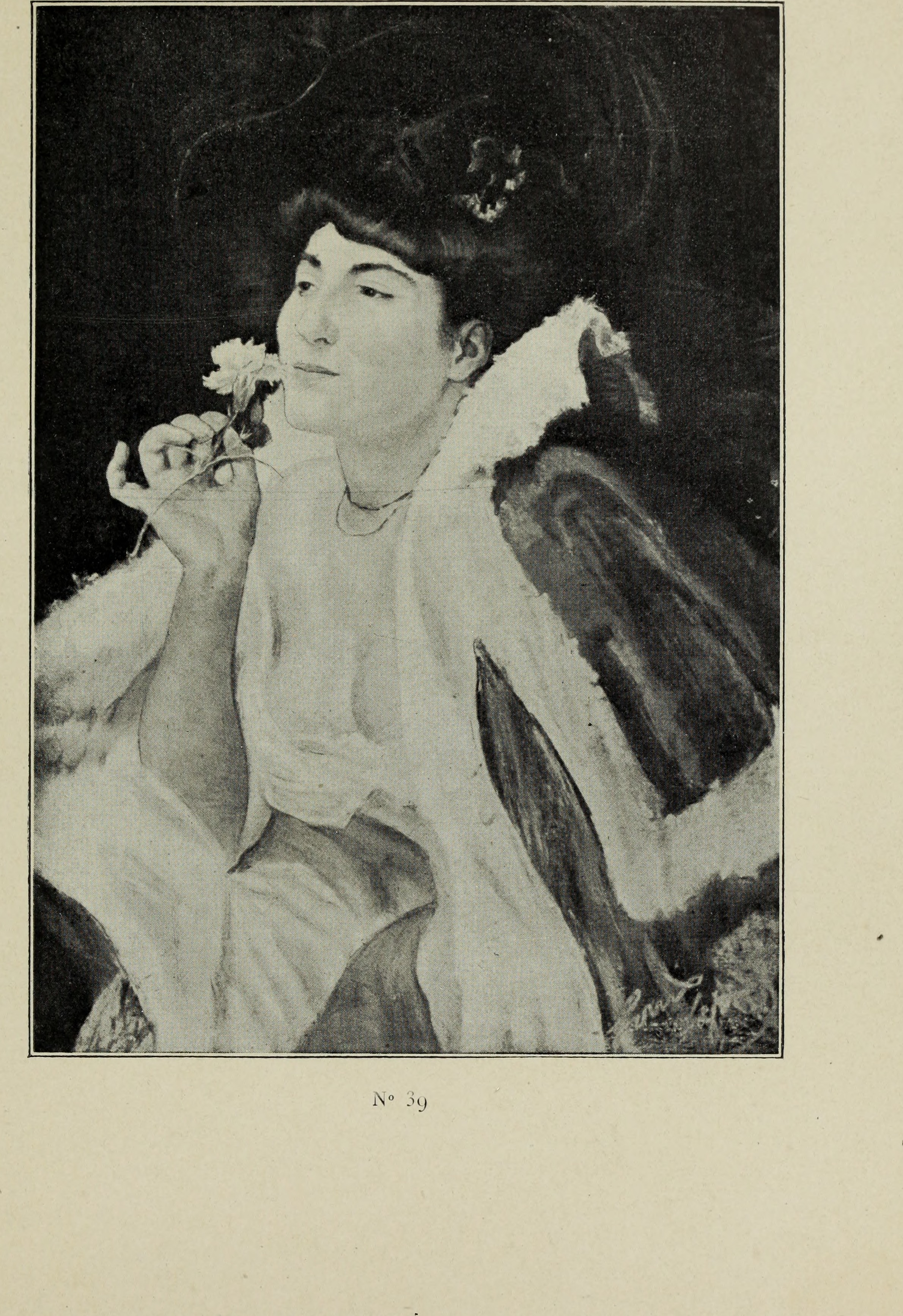
Mme. G..., 1904

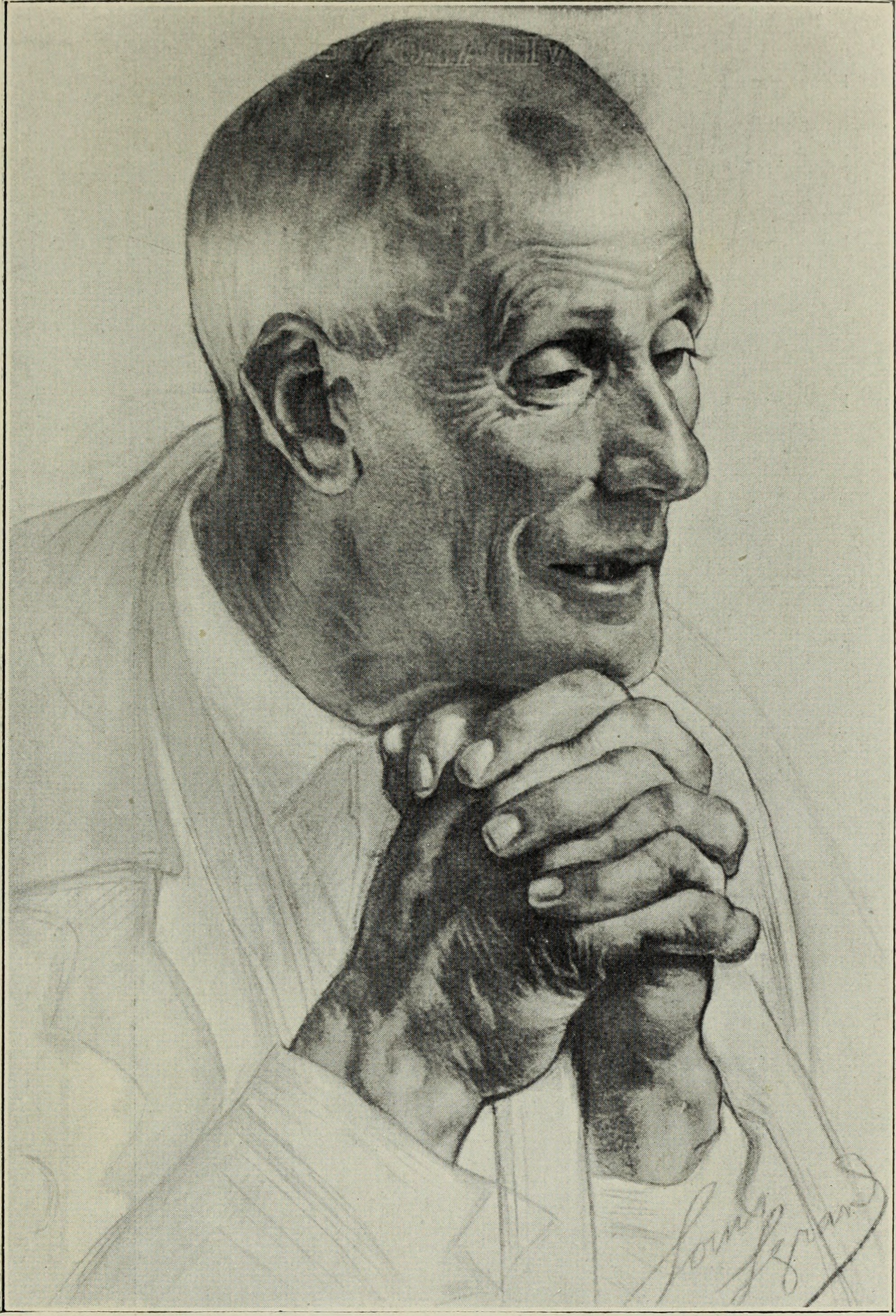
"Praying man", 1904

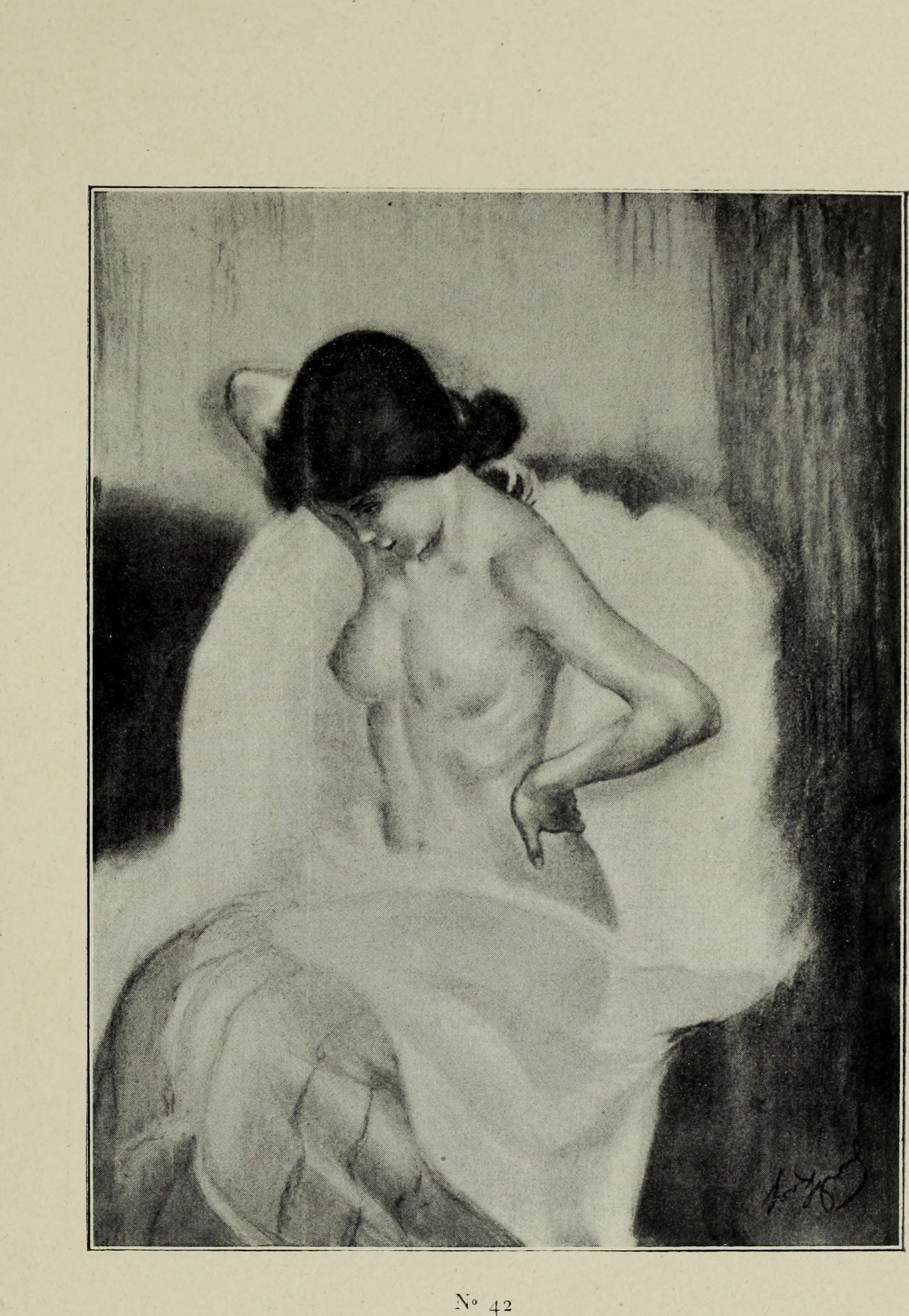
Etude de nu, 1904

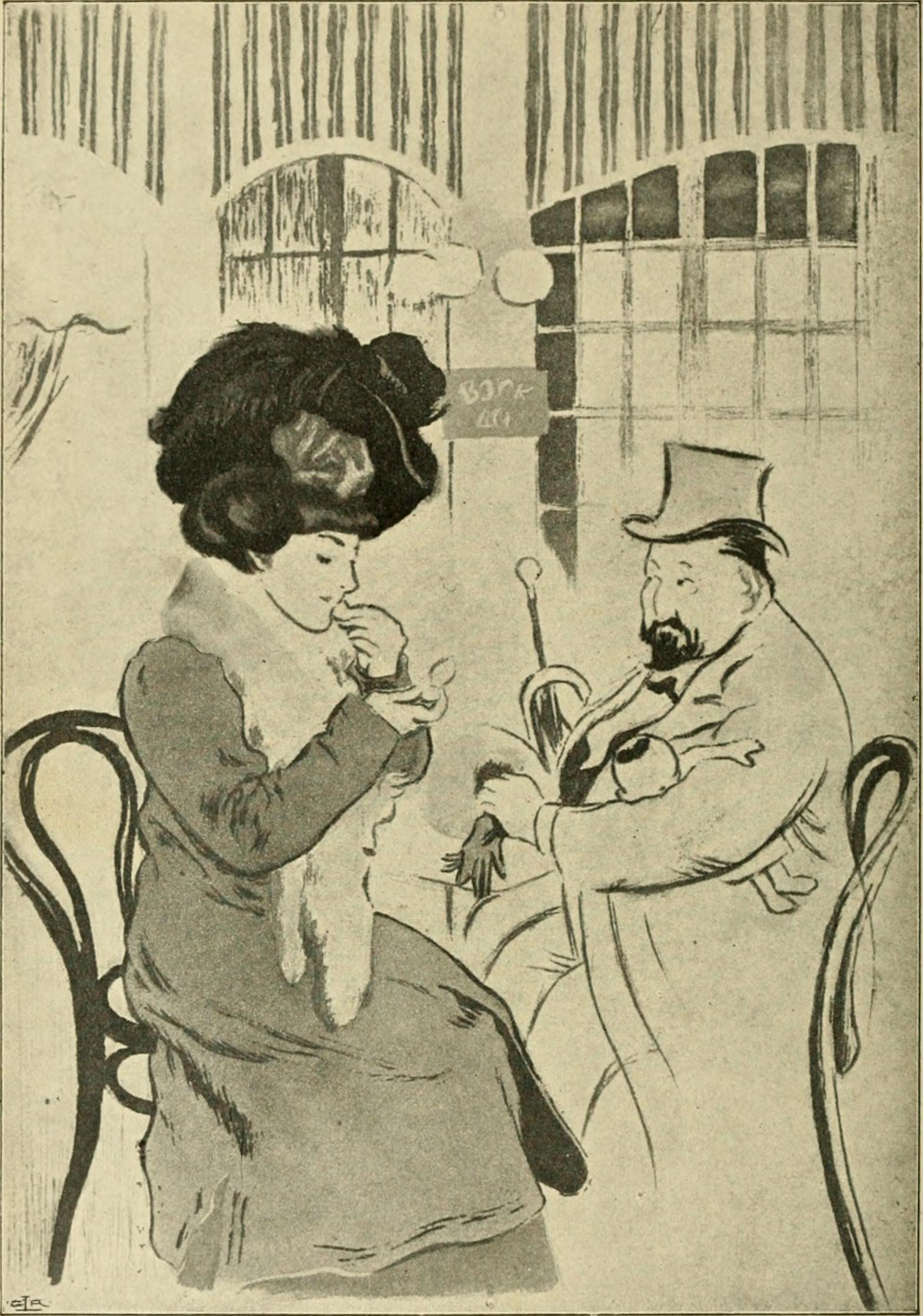
"Temporary acquaintance", 1910

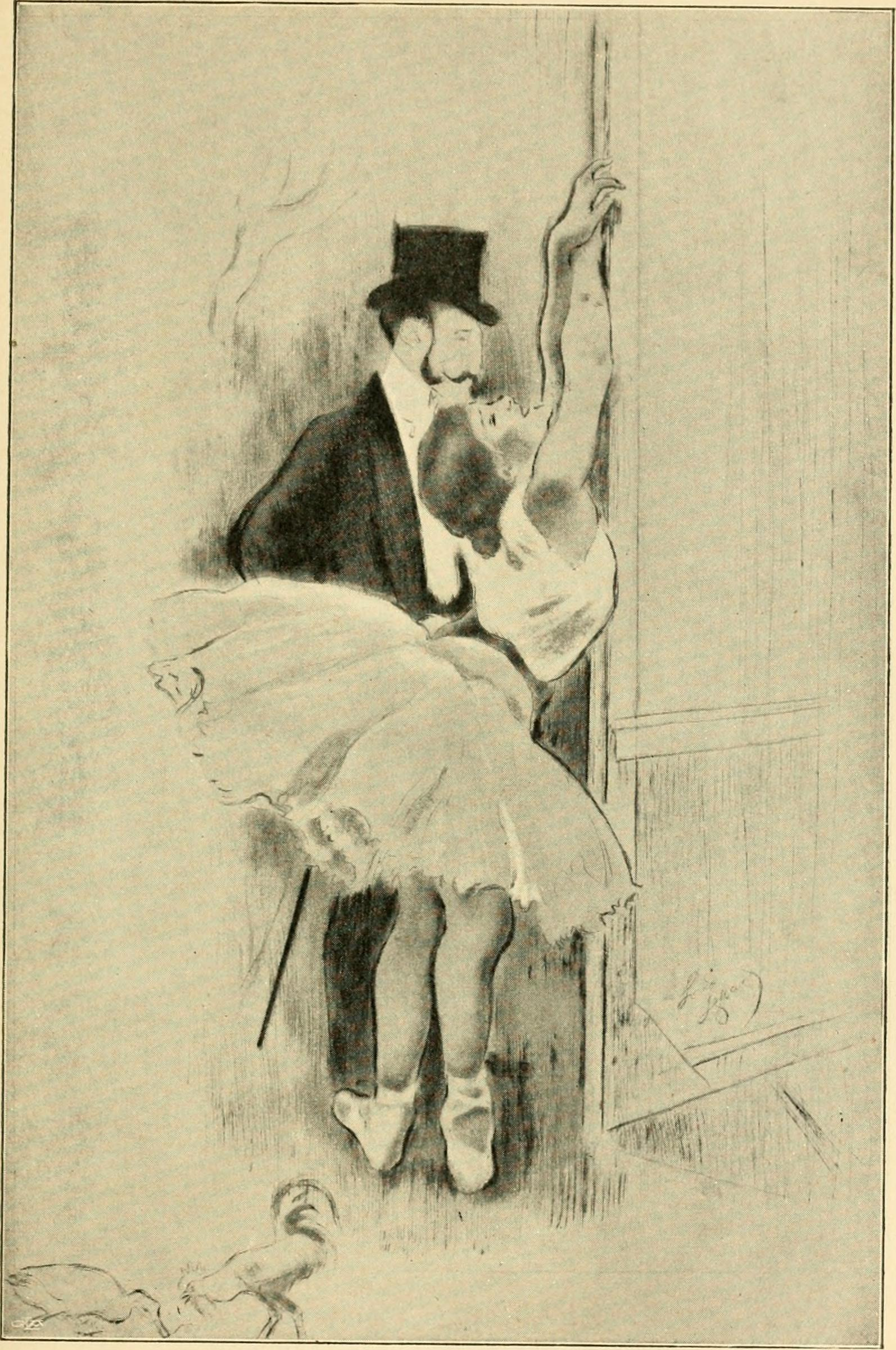
Petite marcheuse, 1910

== Books illustrated ==
- de Maupassant, Guy: Cinq Contes Parisiens, 1905.
- Poe, Edgar Alan: Quinze Histoires d'Edgar Poe, 1897.

== Awards and exhibitions ==
- 1896: First solo exhibition, Paris.
- 1900: Silver Medal, Universal Exhibition, Paris.
- 1906: Légion d'honneur.
- 1911: Retrospective exhibition, Palais de Modes, Paris.
- 2006: Retrospective exhibition, Félicien Rops Museum, Namur, Belgium.

== Works in collections ==
- Joie Maternelle ("Maternal Joy"), 1900, Yale Medical Historical Library.
- Titi. Brooklyn Museum.

== See also ==
- Martin van Maële

== Bibliography ==
- Arwas, Victor. Belle Époque: Louis Legrand. New York, 1978.
- Arwas, Victor. Louis Legrand: Catalogue Raisonné. Papadakis, 2006.
- Kahn, Gustave. Louis Legrand. Special issue of "L'Art et le Beau" magazine, 1908.
- Mauclair, Camille. Études sur quelques artistes originaux. Louis Legrand, peintre et graveur. Paris, 1910.
