= Pallot =

Pallot may refer to:

== People ==
- June Pallot (1953 – 2004), New Zealand professor of accounting and a registered architect
- Nerina Pallot, English singer

== Other ==
- Pallot's Marriage Index
- Pallot Heritage Steam Museum
