= Boyd's Marriage Index =

Boyd's Marriage Index is a tangled typescript bound in 533 volumes listing more than 3,500,000 English marriages for the period 1538 to 1837. It is held by the Society of Genealogists, London.

It may also be viewed on fiche or searched using printed copies. It has now been transcribed and may be searched online or (in parts) on CD. It is only an index - a list of pointers (locators) to where material may be found and does not contain month and day details of the records it contains, just the year.

Index entries contain the surname and Christian name(s) of the bride and groom, the year, county and parish where the marriage took place, and source of the record. The original Index is held at the Society of Genealogists and it may be searched online through the subscription website Findmypast.

== Coverage ==
All English counties are covered, though none completely, and the periods indexed vary according to the copies of records which were readily available. Registers from over 4,300 parishes have been indexed, a total of over 7 million individuals or "names". Well over a million of these names relate to the London and Middlesex areas.

There are two basic series. The first (Main) series is arranged in county order; The second series, is arranged in phonetic name order. Other supplements have been completed since Boyd's death in 1955.

There are some errors in the Boyd's indexes and information should always be checked against the original sources.

== Compilation ==
The index was initially compiled at his expense by Percival Boyd, MA, FSA, FSG (1866–1955) and his staff between 1925 and Boyd's death in 1955 from printed and transcribed parish registers, Bishop's Transcripts (copies of the registers sent annually to the relevant bishop or archdeacon, marriage licences, banns and other sources. A number of further supplements to Boyd's index are now available.

== Searching ==
Note from the following Guildhall Library instructions the complexity of searching fiche or printed copies:

The arrangement of the Index is, due to the way in which it was originally put together, rather complex. It is divided into three series. The Main Series is arranged in alphabetical order by county, and covers Cambridgeshire, Cornwall, Cumberland, Derbyshire, Devonshire, Durham, Essex, Gloucestershire, Lancashire, London (defined as the City of London and the county of Middlesex), Norfolk, Northumberland, Shropshire, Somerset, Suffolk and Yorkshire. Each county is then subdivided into ten periods: 1538-1600, 1601-1625, 1626-1650, 1651-1675, 1676-1700, 1701-1725, 1726-1750, 1751-1775, 1776-1800, and 1800-1837. Each of these subdivisions is then arranged alphabetically by surname.

All marriages are indexed under the names of both bride and groom, but for some counties the brides and grooms are listed in a single sequence, while in others they are divided into two separate sequences. The Main Series is followed by the Second and Third Series. These two series contain marriages for the remaining English counties, and some additional marriages for the counties included in the Main Series. They are not divided by county; but are subdivided into the same time periods as the Main Series (except that the Second Series contains no entries after 1775), and are then alphabetical by surname.

To find a particular marriage, therefore, first look in the Main Series for the county, then for the period, and then the surname you are seeking. If you do not find a section for the county you want, or if the county is there but you have failed to find the marriage, then check the Second and Third Series.

== See also ==
- Pallot's Marriage Index
