= Palette =

Palette may refer to:

- Cosmetic palette, an archaeological form
- Palette, another name for a color scheme
- Palette (painting), a wooden board used for mixing colors for a painting
  - Palette knife, an implement for painting
- Palette (company), a Japanese visual novel studio (video game company)
- Palette (computing), in computer graphics, another name given to a color lookup table
- Palette (freeware game), a Japanese-language freeware adventure game
- Palette window, in computing, a window type often containing tools
- Palette valve, the valve under an organ pipe which is connected to the keyboards as opposed to the stop valve
- Palette, a village in the commune Le Tholonet, in the Provence region of southern France
  - Palette AOC, a wine Appellation d'Origine Contrôlée located in the aforementioned village
- Palette Records, a record label
- Palette (album), by IU, 2017
  - "Palette" (song), the title song
- Palette (EP), by Nobuhiko Okamoto, 2012
- "Palette", a 2021 song by Tokoyami Towa
- Toyota Palette, a vehicle made by Toyota
- Toyota e-Palette, a concept bus made by Toyota

== See also ==
- Palate, the roof of the mouth
- Pallet, a holder for goods for use with a forklift
- Pellet, small particle typically created by compressing material
- Pallet (disambiguation), for other uses
- Peyton Pallette, American baseball player
