= Tenra War =

2007 Japanese tabletop role-playing game

- Tenra War cover A samurai from Tenra Bansho fights a Rocket Ranger from the United States of 10th-TERRA
- Designers: Jun'ichi Inoue, F.E.A.R.
- Publishers: Enterbrain
- Publication: 2007
- Genres: Oriental fantasy Western
- Systems: Standard RPG System

Tenra War (天羅WAR) is a Japanese mixed-genre tabletop role-playing game designed by Jun'ichi Inoue and FarEast Amusement Research. It was released in April 2007. It is a triple crossover product, based on an oriental science fantasy RPG Tenra Bansho, steampunk western RPG Terra the Gunslinger, and post-apocalypse mecha RPG Angel Gear. All three of the original games were designed by Jun'ichi Inoue.

== Concept ==
The setting is based after the intercontinental war between two continents: Tenra (similar to a high-magic Japan in the Sengoku period) and Terra (similar to a United States in the Wild West). After the war, the world was changed by the influence of great culture clash between oriental and occidental nations. The game starts from that point, after the two cultures have had some time to intermingle. That's when the mysterious alien "Angels" arrive, great psychic/magical creatures with strange and unknowable motives. The basic setup of the game is two radical cultures joining together to fight off an alien invasion.

There are over 40 character classes based on oriental and western cultures in basic rulebook, which include houshi (buddhist monk), Jinguuke (Shinto's agent belonging to the Jinguuke clan), ninja, onmyouji, samurai, Yoroi-nori (mecha pilot), gunslinger, preacher and private eye, rocket ranger (member of US Army's special airborne forces), saloon girl and steam mage. To emphasize the cultural mashup, classes are mixable: One could create a ninja gunfighter, a Taoist Sorcerer Catholic priest, a kugutsu (living doll) saloon girl, and so on. Oriental and western characters fight against the angels that are arch-foes of humankind together.

The game is using the Standard RPG System, a ruleset also used for Alshard, Alshard Gaia and Kaze no Stigma RPG There are variances for character generation, and there are additional extra rules for things like Fate and Asura, the latter meaning, in this context, the possibility of becoming evil.

== Differences from source material ==
The world as imagined in the original Tenra Bansho game (1996–1997) and the original Terra the Gunslinger game was a huge planet with contained Tenra's "Japan" to the East, Terra's "USA" to the West. Tenra originally makes reference to the continent of India to Tenra's East. In Tenra War, this world is reconfigured so that the lands of Tenra are to the "South", the lands of Terra are to the "North", and they exist together in one giant Ringworld-like structure.

== List of products ==
- Tenra War, basic rulebook, Enterbrain, ISBN 978-4-7577-3488-3
- Lost Heaven, supplement, Enterbrain, ISBN 978-4-7577-3757-0

== See also ==
- Standard RPG System
- Alshard
