= Pellet =

Pellets are small particles typically created by compressing an original material.

Pellet or pellets may refer to:

== People ==
- Alain Pellet (born 1947), French lawyer
- Gustave Pellet (1859–1919), French publisher of art
- Laurent Pellet (born 1970), Swiss judoka

== Science and technology ==
- Nurdle (bead), or the pre-production plastic pellet
- Pellet (ornithology), regurgitated by birds
- Pellets (petrology), a carbonate sedimentary structure in limestone
- Pellet (steel industry), a processed form of iron ore
- Pellet fuel, mostly as wood pellets used as biofuel
- Pellet (software), an OWL semantic reasoner
- Pellet stove, to burn compressed wood or biomass pellets

== Weapons ==
- Airsoft pellet, projectiles used specifically by airsoft guns
- Pellet (air gun), non-spherical projectiles fired from air guns
- Shot (pellet), projectiles for shotguns or other weapons

== See also ==
- El Bola (lit. 'Pellet'), a 2000 Spanish coming-of-age drama film
- Palate, the roof of the mouth
- Palette (disambiguation)
- Pallet, a holder for goods for use with a forklift
- Pelletizing, the process of turning material into pellets
- William Pellett (1809 – unknown), English cricketer
