= Gustave Pellet =

French art publisher (1859–1919)

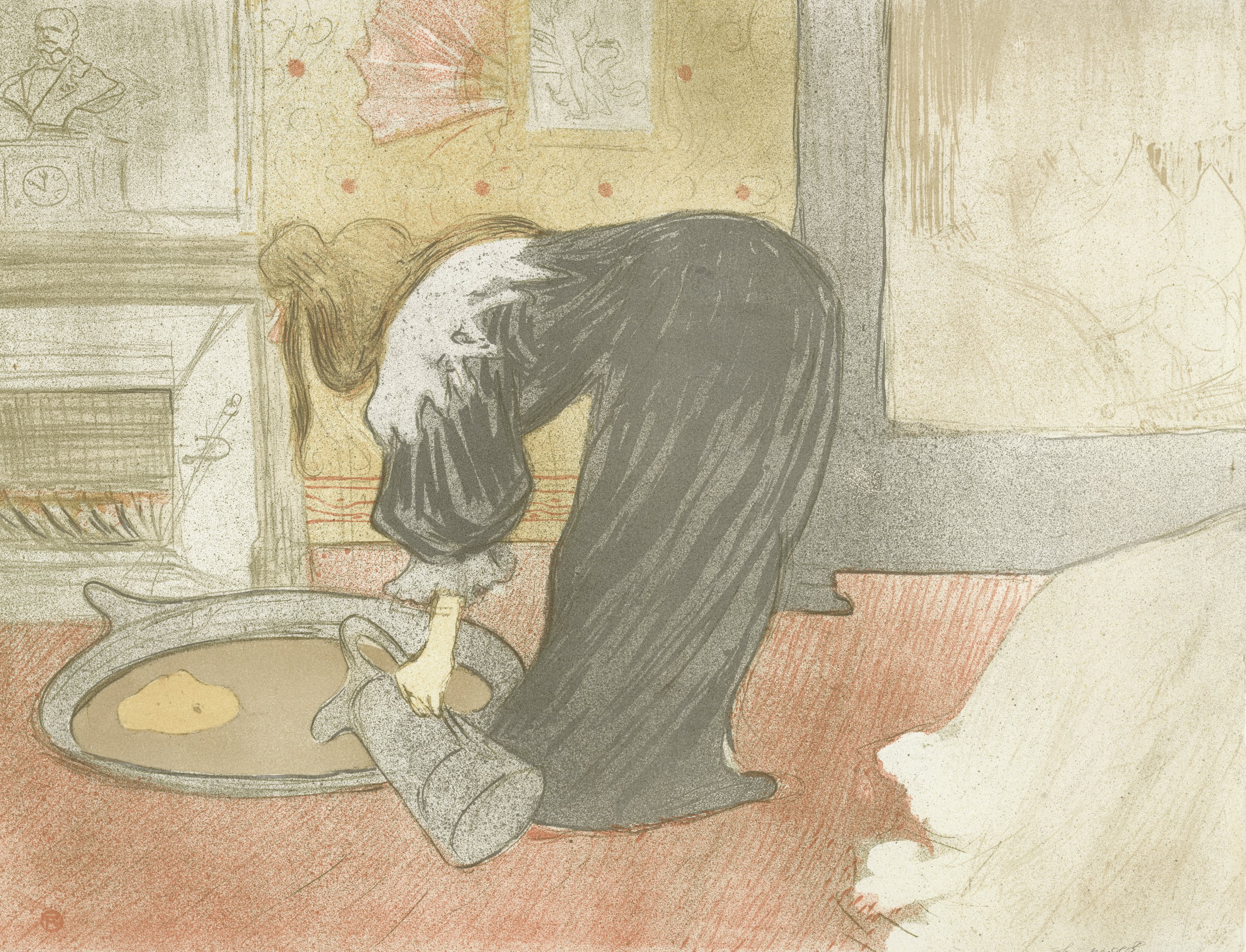
Elles - Woman at the tub, a print by Henri de Toulouse-Lautrec published by Pellet in 1896. Pellet's distinctive reddish-brown circular monogram stamp is in the lower-left corner.

Gustave Pellet (1859–1919) was a French publisher of art. He is best known for publishing prints of erotic artworks by Henri de Toulouse-Lautrec and Louis Legrand.

== Life and work ==
Gustave Jean Baptiste Xavier Pellet was born to a wealthy family. His spend his youth traveling and collecting art books. When the family fortune disappeared in a financial crash in 1886, Pellet decided, with a part of his book collection, to open a library in the Quai Voltaire in Paris. Pellet became a publisher of art books and fine art prints in 1887. He then moved to 51, Rue le Peletier, also in Paris. Pellet owned the rights to the artworks of Félicien Rops, whose watercolour paintings and drawings he published in a book of a hundred plates engraved by Albert Bertrand, some in colour.

Among Pellet's artists were the Post-Impressionist painters Henri de Toulouse-Lautrec and Paul Signac. However, the artist that Pellet is best known for, and who he was the first to publish, is the engraver Louis Legrand. Artworks such as proof prints published by Pellet were often marked with his distinctive red monogram stamp.

The artworks were often erotic, both Toulouse-Lautrec and before him Legrand making detailed studies of the night life of late nineteenth-century Paris. For example, the 1896 Elles ("Them") was a series of ten Toulouse-Lautrec lithographs and a frontispiece, which Pellet had printed on high quality wove paper, in a small edition of only 100; the paper was left deckle edged, and was specially watermarked "G. Pellet / T. Lautrec"; the women are mostly from Paris brothels, and they are shown relaxing, washing and dressing. Pellet inscribed the Elles prints in the lower right corner in pen with brown ink.

Pellet published three volumes, Livre d'Heures, La Faune Parisienne, and Poèmes à l'Eau-forte (1914), illustrated by Legrand. He published twenty volumes by Toulouse-Lautrec from 1892 onwards. Alongside his book publishing, Pellet also published individual lithographs by artists including Paul Signac, Georges Redon, Maximilien Luce, and Louis Anquetin.

After the war, Pellet passed on his workshop-gallery to his son-in-law, Maurice Exsteens, who was still selling his work in the 1940s-1950s.

== See also ==
- Eberhard Kornfeld
- Emil Georg Bührle
- Galerie Bernheim-Jeune

== Bibliography ==
- Exsteens, Maurice (1962). Archives de la Maison Gustave Pellet. Bern: Klipstein et Kornfeld.
