= Enterbrain =

Japanese publisher

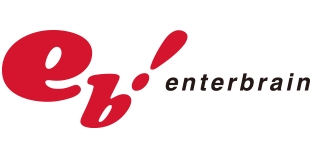
- Founded: January 30, 1987; 39 years ago
- Area served: Japan
- Key people: Hirokazu Hamamura
- Products: Magazines and Books
- Parent: Kadokawa Future Publishing

Enterbrain (エンターブレイン), formerly Enterbrain, Inc. (株式会社エンターブレイン, Kabushiki Gaisha Entāburein), is a Japanese publisher and division of Kadokawa Future Publishing founded on January 30, 1987, as ASCII Film Co., Ltd. (アスキー映画株式会社, Asukī Eiga Kabushiki-gaisha). Magazines published by Enterbrain are generally focused on video games and computer entertainment as well as video game and strategy guides. In addition, the company publishes a small selection of anime artbooks. Enterbrain is based in Tokyo, Japan, with a paid-in capital of 410 million yen. Enterbrain's current president is Hirokazu Hamamura.

== Enterbrain publications ==
- B's LOG: Magazine focused on female gamers.
- TECH Win DVD: A magazine aimed specifically to PC users. It comes with two CD-ROMs worth of goodies and information.
- Tech Gian: A CD-ROM magazine focused on adult video games.
- Magi-Cu: A seinen visual entertainment manga magazine based on female game characters.
- Comic Beam: Comic Beam was formerly known as ASCII Comic. It is a seinen manga magazine filled with original manga.
- Harta (formerly Fellows!): A periodical seinen manga magazine consisting of original manga stories.
- Monthly Arcadia (月刊アーカディア): a 2000 monthly magazine focused on arcade game machines. It was started by former staff of (bi)monthly arcade game magazine Gamest (ゲーメスト) from 1986 which was published by Shinseisha, Ltd. Arcadia also has game hints and advice for the latest arcade games as well as high score reports from Japanese arcades.
- Sarabure: A horse racing magazine.
- Famitsu Connect!On: Magazine focused on online video games.
- Logout Tabletalk RPG Series: Tabletop role-playing games.
- biohazard Kaitai Shinsho: a series of guides for the Resident Evil franchise.

== Enterbrain software ==
- RPG Maker: a role-playing game creation tool
- Fighter Maker: a fighting games creation tool
- Sim RPG Maker: a tactical RPG games creation tool
- Shooter Maker: a shoot-'em-up games creation tool
- IG Maker: creates platformer, adventure, and shoot-'em-up games. Also supports creation of games for the Xbox 360 console.

== Tabletop role-playing games ==
- Alshard
- Alshard GAIA
- Blade of Arcana
- Inou Tsukai (異能使い, lit. Users of strange powers): a Japanese superhero role-playing game set in modern Japan and includes elements of Japanese mythology such as yokais.
- Night Wizard!
- Star Legend
- Tenra War
- Terra the Gunslinger
- Tokyo NOVA

== Video games ==
- Panzer Front (1999)
- Tear Ring Saga (2001)
- Palette (2001)
- Galerians: Ash (2002)
- Berwick Saga (2005)
- KimiKiss (2006)
- The Magician's Academy (2007)
- Amagami (2009)
- Earth Seeker (2011)
- Photo Kano (2012)

== Light novels ==
Enterbrain releases light novels under their Famitsu Bunko imprint, which was established in 1998 and is aimed at young adult males. They also publish B's-LOG Bunko and B's-LOG Bunko Alice imprint focusing on girls and KCG Bunko focused on teens.

Enterbrain also publishes stand-alone series without any imprint such as Yōjo Senki or Overlord.

== Anime ==
Busou Chuugakusei: Basket Army (2012) – short anime and audio drama. Busou Chuugakusei is the first venture in Enterbrain's XXolution project, a multimedia initiative that will span manga, novels, anime, illustrations, scripts, music, and other fields.

== See also ==
- ASCII Media Works
- Kadokawa Shoten
