= Pallot's Marriage Index =

Index to English marriages since 1837

Pallot's Marriage Index includes more than 1.5 million marriages in England (three million people) which took place between 1780 and the commencement of civil registration on 1 July 1837.

Pallot's Marriage Index covers all but two of the 103 Church of England parishes in the old City of London and Middlesex, and more than 2,500 parishes in 38 counties outside London. Compilation began in 1813 using handwritten slips of paper to record the names of the bride and groom, the date of marriage and the church or chapel in which the marriage was celebrated. Collection continued over a period of more than 150 years, often including details such as whether the bride and groom had been spinsters, bachelors, widows, or widowers. The information was collected by record agents for the purposes of their business.

There was an equivalent baptismal section, but this was severely damaged during the London Blitz; however, some 100,000 entries survive.

The index also has some entries from other countries, usually transcribed from printed sources.

For a long time the property of Messrs Pallot & Co., the original index now belongs to the Institute of Heraldic and Genealogical Studies, headquartered in Canterbury. The index has been transcribed, and may be accessed on CD or online from subscription websites.

== See also ==
- Boyd's Marriage Index
- FreeBMD
