= Palate =

Roof of the mouth

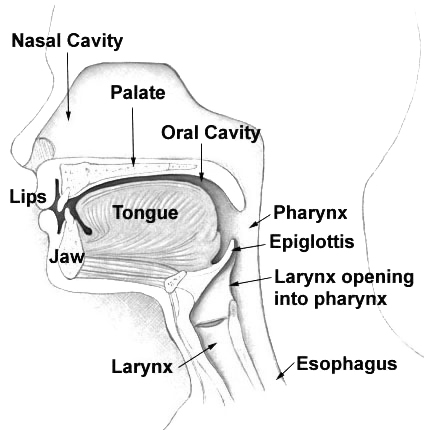
- Head and neck.

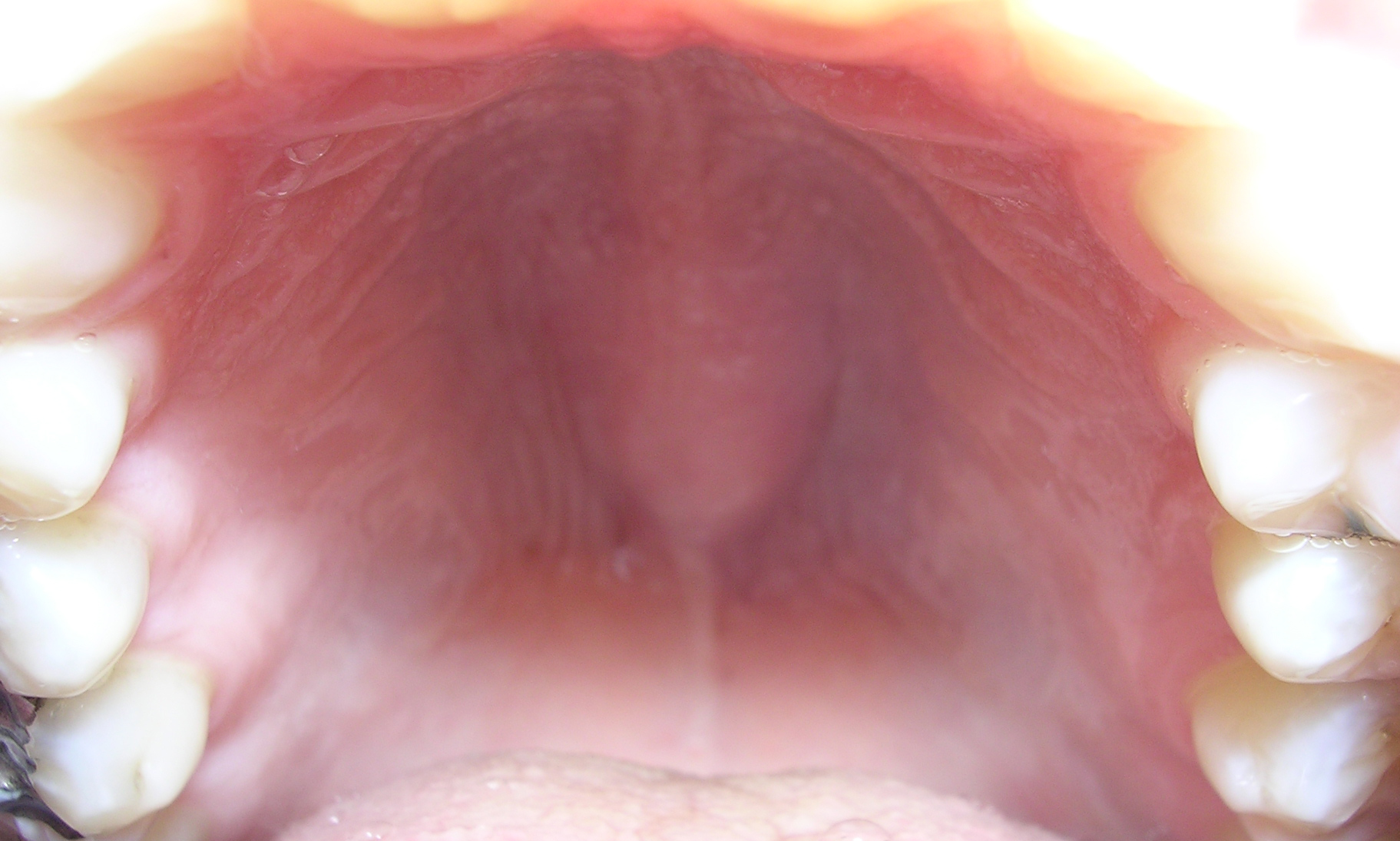
- Palate exhibiting torus palatinus

Details

Identifiers
- Latin: palatum
- MeSH: D010159
- TA98: A05.1.01.102
- TA2: 2778
- FMA: 54549

The palate (/ˈpælɪt/) is the roof of the mouth in humans and other mammals. It separates the oral cavity from the nasal cavity. A similar structure is found in crocodilians, but in most other tetrapods, the oral and nasal cavities are not truly separated. The palate is divided into two parts, the anterior, bony hard palate and the posterior, fleshy soft palate (or velum).

== Structure ==
=== Innervation ===
The maxillary nerve branch of the trigeminal nerve supplies sensory innervation to the palate.

=== Development ===
The hard palate forms before birth.

=== Variation ===
If the fusion is incomplete, a cleft palate results.

== Function in humans ==
When functioning in conjunction with other parts of the mouth, the palate produces certain sounds, particularly velar, palatal, palatalized, postalveolar, alveolopalatal, and uvular consonants.

== Evolution ==
Early synapsids lacked the secondary palate separating the mouth and nasal cavities, with this feature evolving in cynodonts and retained by mammals. Ancestrally in tetrapods, the roof of the mouth has patches of teeth (palatal dentition). These teeth are retained in living lepidosaurian reptiles and modern amphibians and were present in early synapsids and therapsids, but were lost in cynodonts and their mammalian descendants.

== History ==
=== Etymology ===
The English synonyms palate and palatum, and also the related adjective palatine (as in palatine bone), are all from the Latin palatum via Old French palat, words that like their English derivatives, refer to the "roof" of the mouth.

The Latin word palatum is of unknown (possibly Etruscan) ultimate origin and served also as a source to the Latin word meaning palace, palatium, from which other senses of palatine and the English word palace derive, and not the other way round.

As the roof of the mouth was once considered the seat of the sense of taste, palate can also refer to this sense itself, as in the phrase "a discriminating palate". By further extension, the flavor of a food (particularly beer or wine) may be called its palate, as when a wine is said to have an oaky palate.

== See also ==
- Language
- Vocal tract
- Pallet, palette and pellet, objects whose names are homophonous with palate for many English-speakers
- Palatability

== Bibliography ==
- Saladin, Kenneth (2010). Anatomy and Physiology: The Unity of Form and Function. New York: McGraw Hill. p. 256.
- Thompson, Gale (2005–2006). World of Anatomy and Physiology. Thompson Corporation. pp. Palate (Hard and Soft Palate).
