= Palette (video game) =

- Developer: Nishida Yoshitaka "Yubiningyō"
- Engine: RPG Tsukūru 95
- Platform: Microsoft Windows
- Release: April 26, 2001
- Genre: Adventure game
- Mode: Single player

Palette (パレット, Paretto) is a psychological horror adventure game developed with RPG Tsukūru 95 by Nishida Yoshitaka. The game was highly acclaimed in the Fourth ASCII Entertainment Software Contest, awarded a Grand Prix of 10,000,000 yen, and was remade for PlayStation by Enterbrain. That version, entitled Forget me not -Palette-, saw release on April 26, 2001 exclusively in Japan.

== Gameplay ==
In Palette, the player controls Dr. Shianosu B. Shian (シアノス・B・シアン), a renowned psychologist specializing in memory, and his patient, an amnesiac girl known only as "B.D." Communicating using the telephone in Shian's office, Shian guides B.D. as she explores a maze-like dreamscape of her traumatic memories. At first, each memory is missing crucial details, which are filled in as B.D. investigates the memory. As B.D. fills in her memories, new paths open in the dreamscape, allowing her to explore new memories.

Some fragments of her memory are in wrong part of the dreamscape and must be taken to the correct one. With each of these pieces B.D. discovers, the maximum length of a gauge on the right of the screen is increased by one. This gauge essentially represents her mental health. As she travels down paths of her memory and breaks down barriers, it decreases. If it reaches zero, she gets a painful headache and the telephone call ends. When Shian redials B.D., she must restart the journey from the first room, but the details in her memories she fills in, the fragments she collects, and the maximum length of her gauge are permanent.

There are also circles of light in the dreamscape that recover B.D.'s gauge when she steps into them. These will usually only appear if her gauge is low enough, so in some cases the player must find a way to intentionally damage B.D. so that the circle will appear, allowing her to heal and make further progress. Some rooms also have hidden passageways that the player can discover.

The other character, Dr. Shian, is trapped in his office, but can use his library and other objects in the room to gain new information about topics that B.D. remembers.

== Plot ==
Shian is closing down his office for the night when a mysterious figure asks for his help. When Shian refuses, they shoot through his office door. Shian complies with the figure and is instructed to help B.D. over the telephone.

B.D. is initially completely incapable of remembering anything at all. She doesn't know her own name, where she lives, the names of her family, or even if she has any family. She can't even remember her own face. She slowly begins to recall some details, but they are scattered across all periods of her life, and it is difficult to connect them logically or gain much meaning from them.

Each memory is related to a traumatic moment of her life, which B.D. associates with the color red. The first memories seen are the last chronologically, and appear to be of a violent murder taking place in B.D.'s home. Earlier memories depict scenes from her young childhood, then of her life with a series of caretakers. B.D. slowly begins to be able to differentiate these caretakers, but still can't remember their names or faces. One of them, a woman with a red silhouette, is present in the murder memory.

Even before losing her memory, B.D. struggled with horrible loneliness. Many of her memories are scenes of her isolated and alone. B.D. is very introspective, and often thinks about how many of the details in her memories (an empty birdcage, a lone apple separated from the rest, a toy telephone that can't call anyone, a clothing store display of a happy family of mannequins) ironically reflect on herself.

Slowly B.D. and Shian begin to piece together fragments of her traumatic past. Two families, each horribly murdered, each with only the father and youngest daughter surviving. A strange city called Zebul (ゼブル). A drug that causes amnesia, and a society dedicated to the elimination of crime. Perhaps most interesting is a medical term, "Born of Disorder", which is abbreviated to B.D.

As they make progress, Shian finds books containing relevant information, books that he can't remember ever owning. Slowly, he begins to find other details from B.D.'s dreams in his office. Scratches on his wall, a newspaper from a company that doesn't exist, and a music box. The more B.D. fills in the gaps in her memory, the more real her dreams feel, and the less real Shian's office feels. At one point, Shian discovers that his telephone line has been cut, but he is still able to call and help B.D. despite this.

The two discover one of B.D.'s happy memories for the first time: her favorite television show, centered around a genius psychologist named Shianosu B. Shian, who helps people recover their memories.

The mysterious figure enters Shian's office, and it is revealed that the entire room is imaginary. The whole time B.D. has been pretending to be Shian as a way to deal with her trauma. She's been pretending to call herself on her toy telephone, and the room is full of details from her dreams because it is her room. The mysterious figure is revealed to be the same woman as the red silhouette, who worked for the anti-crime society that originally took away B.D.'s memories, which she has now betrayed. That society is now hunting both of them down; the woman for her betrayal, and B.D. because they believe she is destined to be a criminal, as well as for knowing too many of the society's secrets. Rather than give herself up and either have her memories taken away again or killed, B.D. resolves to run away with the woman. B.D. recovers one last memory, a truly happy moment of being held by her parents as a baby.

Shian shares some closing thoughts with the audience, saying that all memories are worth keeping. A painful memory is just as important as the color red on a palette.

== Release and reception ==
PlayStation Scores

Review score
Publication	Score
Famitsu	6/10, 8/10, 7/10, 8/10

Forget Me Not -Palette- was released in Japan for the PlayStation on April 26, 2001.

Three reviewers in Famitsu said the major drawback in the game was the low quality graphics. They generally complimented the story for engrossing nature while one said the ending was a "love it or hate it" ending. Another reviewer complimented the game's puzzle-game-like nature making it feel completely different.
