= Kaze no Stigma =

Japanese light novel series

- Cover of the first light novel volume (Kindle edition)

風の聖痕 (Kaze no Sutiguma)
- Genre: Action, romance, supernatural
- Light novel
- Written by: Takahiro Yamato
- Illustrated by: Hanamaru Nanto
- Published by: Fujimi Shobo
- Imprint: Fujimi Fantasia Bunko
- Original run: January 18, 2002 – March 20, 2010
- Volumes: 12
- Manga

Kaze no Stigma -Kouen no Miko-
- Written by: Takahiro Yamato
- Illustrated by: Neko Miyakai
- Published by: Fujimi Shobō
- Magazine: Monthly Dragon Age
- Original run: April 9, 2007 – March 6, 2008
- Volumes: 2
- Anime television series
- Directed by: Junichi Sakata
- Produced by: Hidemasa Arai; Takashi Tachizaki; Tsuneo Takechi
- Written by: Mayori Sekijima
- Music by: Yutaka Fukuoka
- Studio: Gonzo
- Licensed by: Crunchyroll (Note: In North America through Crunchyroll, LLC (formerly known as Funimation).)
- Original network: Chiba TV, TV Saitama, Tokyo MX TV, KBS Kyoto, Gunma TV
- English network: SA: Animax; SEA: Animax; US: Funimation Channel
- Original run: April 12, 2007 – September 21, 2007
- Episodes: 24

Kaze no Stigma (Japanese: 風の聖痕(スティグマ), Hepburn: Kaze no Sutiguma; lit. "Stigma of the Wind") is a Japanese light novel series written by Takahiro Yamato and illustrated by Hanamaru Nanto. After the death of Yamato on July 20, 2009, the story remains incomplete at twelve volumes. A 24-episode anime adaptation directed by Junichi Sakata and animated by Gonzo aired from April–September 2007.

== Plot ==
Kazuma Kannagi was the eldest son of the Kannagi family and presumed heir. However, due to his inability to use "Enjutsu" (炎術; Blaze Technique), the power to control flames, within his family he was considered to be useless. Despite his inability to wield fire, his father insisted on him competing for the right to wield "Enraiha" (炎雷覇; Blaze Lightning Supremacy), a powerful heirloom sword traditionally wielded by the family heir. The 16-year-old Kazuma was soundly defeated by 12-year-old Ayano Kannagi, his second cousin, and his father banished him from the family.

Four years later, he returns as a master of "Fūjutsu" (風術; Wind Technique), the power to control wind, and with a new name: Kazuma Yagami. Soon after his return, several Kannagi family members are killed by someone using Fūjutsu and Kazuma is presumed to have committed the murders in revenge for his banishment. Though innocent of the murders, he is confronted by various members of his former family who wish to fight him. However, the only person that Kazuma wants to fight is his father, the strongest Enjutsu user and whom he later defeats in a duel.

Kazuma is revealed to be a Contractor, a rare individual who has entered into a contract with the "Kaze no Seirei-Ō" (風の霊魂王; Wind Spirit King). Due to this, Kazuma is able to draw upon the wind spirits around him, which amplifies his inherent powers, and allows him to heal his wounds. When using this power, his eyes turn azure blue. However, this ability puts a strain on his body, as it is his stamina and will that limits the amount of power available to him.

After the duel Kazuma returns to his hotel and finds that his younger brother, Ren Kannagi, an extremely powerful Enjutsu user in his own right, has been eagerly waiting to see his adored elder brother again. Their reunion is interrupted by the Fūjutsu user who killed the other Kannagi and who kidnaps Ren. Kazuma returns to his former home to consult with the head of the Kannagi. Ayano intrudes into their meeting and, believing Kazuma to be guilty of the murders, attacks him on sight. Remonstrated by the family head, and her father, Ayano works with Kazuma to rescue Ren.

Further story arcs revolve around Kazuma, Ayano and Ren and the growing relationship between them.

== Characters ==
=== Protagonists ===
Kazuma Yagami (八神 和麻, Yagami Kazuma)
Voiced by: Daisuke Ono, Akeno Watanabe (child) (Japanese); Robert McCollum (English)
The title character and main protagonist of the series. Born Kazuma Kannagi, he is a former member of the Kannagi household and was born without the ability to use Enjutsu. As a result he was bullied by the other clan members. Despite his inability to wield fire, his father insisted that he contend for the position of clan heir, and he was easily defeated in the ceremony to wield "Enraiha", his family's sacred sword, by his second cousin, Ayano. At the age of 18, due to his failure, his father banishes Kazuma. It is hinted in the anime that he may have done so out of kindness, so that Kazuma would find his own path rather than languishing in misery at home. Four years later, at the age of 22, he returns to Japan with the name Kazuma Yagami, an arrogant and mercenary attitude and as the most powerful master of Fūjutsu ever known.
It is later revealed that after Kazuma was banished from his family, his only desire was achieving great power. He traveled to a small town in China, where he caused all kinds of trouble until he met Tsui Ling, with whom he fell in love. Contented with his life, Kazuma no longer desired power and was happy just living with her. He survived by doing odd jobs as a freelancer. His happiness, however, came to an abrupt end when an organization used Tsui Ling as a sacrifice to summon a powerful demon. Blaming himself for failing to protect her, Kazuma once again sought out great power, leading to his engaging in a contract with the Wind Spirit Lord.
In the light novel, it is revealed that shortly after Tsui Ling's death, Kazuma attempted suicide, but was saved at the last moment by a traveling Taoist sennin. The immortal felt the potential within Kazuma and brought Kazuma to his mountain where Kazuma spent the next year and a half in training. Kazuma was found to have great potential in all jutsu other than fire and could have mastered any of them.
Li Lonyue, another one of the Taoist's disciples, believed that, with more training, Kazuma had the potential to become an immortal like them. However, Kazuma refused the offer, as he found immortality to be pointless and boring, instead opting to leave the mountain when he felt ready to carry out his vengeance. Sometime after becoming a Contractor, he killed Erwin Leszaar, the one responsible for Tsui Ling's death. Kazuma subsequently made a name for himself as the demon-like wind mage, who did not hesitate to hurt others as long as his task was completed.
As a "Fūjutsushi" (風術師; Wind Technique Practitioner), Kazuma's powers are extensive and he is by far the most powerful character in the series. In addition to being able to fly, even while supporting three other people, Kazuma can also launch blasts of wind that act as blades and manipulate the wind spirits to create a barrier that protects his body from physical harm or bends light around him as camouflage. In the anime, he is shown to have the ability to manipulate electricity as well.
When Kazuma is using his Contractor powers and is extremely angry, his normal sky blue eyes turn crimson and his wind attack turns black. In this state, he has no qualms in hurting others with his abilities, as long as he gets what he wants. However, when in this state, his overall powers seem to be weaker. Ayano notes that he is drawing only on a few emotions and is not in complete control of his powers. Further, she states that his normal strength is so overwhelming that she was never afraid of it since her fear seemed pointless. When she realizes that she fears his black wind, she knows she has a chance of defeating him, because that fear means that his power is no longer 'god-like.'
Kazuma's cold, callous personality changes after he returns to Japan and begins to mend his relationship with his family. Near the end of the anime, he admits that he is able to love another person besides Tsui Ling and comes to realize that he is actually in love with Ayano.

Ayano Kannagi (神凪 綾乃, Kannagi Ayano)
Voiced by: Ayumi Fujimura (Japanese); Cherami Leigh (English)
The heroine of the series and a high school student of Seiryō Academy. Sixteen-year-old Ayano is a skilled "Enjutsushi" (炎術師; Blaze Technique Master) and the named successor to the head of the Kannagi family. She is arrogant and impetuous, usually taking action without thinking things through and even defying her father's orders. Although usually undisciplined, she believes deeply in her heritage, and more than once has served as the voice of reason and drawn Kazuma into action or back to sanity. Though cocky and thoughtless on the surface, she is self-conscious and sometimes unsure of herself. She looks to others for guidance and simultaneously feels that, as heir, she should not. She yearns for approval and affection. Despite his arrogance, Ayano develops a crush on Kazuma and is easily flustered when he flirts with her. Her irritation with him is compounded by his habit of teasing her immediately afterwards. She is also indignant when he gets close to another woman. As the series progresses Ayano comes to realize that she is actually in love with Kazuma, who is the only person she sees as stronger in both power and presence than even her own father.
Ayano's power is the Crimson Flame called Kōen (紅炎), but she is not yet able to consciously control it. She also wields Enraiha, the Kannagi's sacred sword, which she earned by defeating Kazuma at the successor ceremony four years before the start of the story. The sword has fire properties and Ayano can summon it at any time.
During combat, Ayano tends to fight recklessly and her anger and pride usually get the better of her. However, her power has helped her get Kazuma out of trouble many times.
Ayano has never beaten Kazuma in any of their sparring matches and hates it when he points out the deficiencies in her fighting style. During their penultimate fight, she berates him furiously for falling for tricks that he taught her.
Ren Kannagi (神凪 煉, Kannagi Ren)
Voiced by: Rika Morinaga (Japanese); Jessie James Grelle (English)
Kazuma's younger brother and the secondary protagonist of the series. He is a 12-year-old boy. He looks up to Ayano, whom he considers to be a big sister, and practically worships Kazuma, stating that one day he hopes to be as strong as him. Ren has the appearance of a bishōnen, which sometimes earns him the contempt of some of his male classmates. Even so, Ren appears to be very popular at his school, excelling in his studies and athletics. His closest friends are Kanon Suzuhara (who has a romantic interest in him) and Tatsuya Serizawa.
Unlike other members of the Kannagi family, Ren never rejected Kazuma for his inability to master fire magic and has always loved and respected him as an older brother. In turn, Kazuma cares for Ren deeply (although he is reluctant to reveal this in front of others) and never hesitates to step in when Ren finds himself in danger.
In one of the story arcs, Ren falls in love with a girl named Ayumi, only to find out that she is a clone created to be a sacrifice in a ritual. Despite saving her from being sacrificed, she still dies due to having an artificially short life span, but not before she tells Ren that she also loves him. Despite Ren's feelings of inadequacy early on in the series, Ayumi's death inspires him to become stronger so that he can protect the ones he loves. Ren's power is the Golden Flame, which has the greatest purification effect. He is a middle school student of Seiryō Academy, the same school Ayano attends.

=== Kannagi family ===
Genma Kannagi (神凪 厳馬, Kannagi Genma)
Voiced by: Rikiya Koyama (Japanese); Mark Stoddard (English)
Ren and Kazuma's strict father. Though he is responsible for banishing Kazuma from the Kannagi family, he only wanted his son to find his own path in life. Like Kazuma, Genma has trouble expressing his feelings in front of others; in fact, both of them are so stubborn and headstrong that every time they meet, they immediately butt heads and seem on the verge of attacking each other. Even though Genma is the strongest Enjutsushi of the Kannagi clan, and wields the blue Divine Flame, Sōen, which only eleven others have wielded since the founding of the clan, on returning to Japan, Kazuma is able to defeat him. Despite their similarities (or perhaps because of them), neither Genma nor Kazuma are willing to admit to the love and respect they have for one another. Like many members of the Kannagi, Genma looked down on the Fūga Clan and wind users in general. When Kazuma goes berserk near the end of the series, Genma is the first to volunteer to assassinate his disinherited son, Even so, he secretly thanks Ayano for offering to stop him because he did not want to kill him, showing that he cares for his son in the background.
Jūgo Kannagi (神凪 重悟, Kannagi Jūgo)
Voiced by: Masaki Terasoma (Japanese); R Bruce Elliott (English)
Ayano's father and Genma's cousin. He is the current head of the Kannagi family. Jūgo worries about his headstrong daughter. As the head of the Kannagi family, Jūgo is responsible for directing the other members of the head family and branch families as well as the Fūga Clan. Contrary to the typical Kannagi doctrine that places merit solely on strength in using fire, Jūgo has been trying to stop discrimination against not only the Fūga Clan but the users of other jutsus as well. He also regrets not being able to stop Kazuma's expulsion from the family. Believing that Kazuma is essential to the Kannagis future, he constantly creates situations which force Ayano and Kazuma to work together in the hopes that they form a relationship. There appears to exist mutual respect between Jūgo and Kazuma.
He is technically the strongest Enjutsushi of the Kannagi and wields the purple flame, but due to his mobility being hampered by a leg injury suffered in a car accident, he cedes that title to Genma. As a result of his injuries, Jūgo is never seen outside the Kannagi compound, and rarely even leaves his meeting room.

=== Tsuwabuki family ===
Kureha Tsuwabuki (石蕗 呉羽, Tsuwabuki Kureha)
Voiced by: Mami Kosuge (Japanese); Lydia Mackay (English)
Older daughter of the Tsuwabuki family, who are skilled "Chijutsushi" (地術師; Earth Technique Practitioners). During her father's absence due to 'illness', she becomes the head of the Tsuwabuki family. When she was born, Zenon, the behemoth of Mt. Fuji, was able to cut off her powers as a Chijutsushi but gave her alternate gravity-controlling powers instead. Like Kazuma, she was ostracized for her lack of power by her family. Later in the series, when Zenon awakens and removes the block it placed on Kureha, her earth power is revealed to be of an extremely high level. Unfortunately, she dies in confronting the behemoth.
Mayumi Tsuwabuki (石蕗 真弓, Tsuwabuki Mayumi)
Voiced by: Eri Miyajima (Japanese); Luci Christian (English)
Younger daughter of the Tsuwabuki family. A clone of her named Ayumi is created to be used as the sacrifice in the Taisai, a chijutsushi ritual of taming the behemoth beneath Mt. Fuji that takes place every 30 years to prevent the volcano from erupting. The ritual, first performed 300 years ago, involves sacrificing the life of a Chijutsushi of the Tsuwabuki family. Due to Kureha's influence, Mayumi is a cold, heartless woman. She later feels remorse after Ayumi's sacrifice.
Ayumi Tsuwabuki (石蕗 あゆみ, Tsuwabuki Ayumi)
Voiced by: Kanako Sakai (Japanese); Luci Christian (English)
The clone of Mayumi Tsuwabuki. Although she has the appearance of a twelve-year-old, she is only a month old. Ayumi's growth was accelerated using the treasure of the Pixies, which is an egg that will hatch into the tribal leader of the Pixies, so that her body grew twelve years in only a month. According to Mayumi, she was also implanted with random memories and has a lifespan of about two months. Ayumi runs away from the Tsuwabuki as the time for the Taisai approaches so that she could have memories of her own, which is how she meets and falls in love with Ren. When Kureha is killed, Ayumi sacrifices her life to weaken Zenon, so that Kazuma, Ren, and Ayano could destroy it.

=== Supporting characters ===
Kirika Tachibana (橘 霧香, Tachibana Kirika)
Voiced by: Sayaka Ohara (Japanese); Colleen Clinkenbeard (English)
A detective working for the Tokyo MPD's Special Investigation Unit, she in charge of investigating crimes related to jutsu. She occasionally works with Kazuma. Her department aims to become the new partner of the Kannagi family, filling the gap created by the Fūga Clan's betrayal. To that end, they assist the Ōgamis by investigating and tracking other users of jutsu. She is later revealed to be an Onmyōji, a practitioner of the Yin Yang arts, who can cast spells through chants and charms. It is revealed that she had met Kazuma two years prior and that after they parted, she had wished to never see him again.
Yukari Shinomiya (篠宮 由香里, Shinomiya Yukari)
Voiced by: Yuka Inokuchi (Japanese); Kate Oxley (English)
Yukari is one of Ayano's best friends and classmate. Yukari, along with Nanase, often teases Ayano about her apparent crush on Kazuma. She is well-connected to the underground information network of the student body and often knows what is happening around the school. Yukari's information extends beyond the school and into many areas of the Tokyo metropolis.
Nanase Kudō (久遠 七瀬, Kudō Nanase)
Voiced by: Shizuka Itō (Japanese); Brina Palencia (English)
Nanase is another of Ayano's best friends and classmate. She and Yukari know about the existence of jutsushi. Nanase is a very athletic student, who is part of many of their school's athletic clubs, and is respected by many of the female students.
Takeya Ōgami (大神 武哉, Ōgami Takeya)
Voiced by: Taketora (Japanese); Vic Mignogna (English)
A member of the Kannagi, Takeya always acted with a calm and level head. He and his partner were sent out to bring Kazuma in for questioning in the matter of the murders of the Kannagi. His partner (who was the brother of the Kannagi whom Kazuma had had met and bested earlier) attacked Kazuma, who defended himself and knocked the two of them unconscious. This allowed Ryūya to kill both of them. Takeya was considered to be a powerful fire user by the family.
Misao Ōgami (大神 操, Ōgami Misao)
Voiced by: Kana Ueda (Japanese); Monica Rial (English)
The younger sister of Takeya, who was the only person who was kind to her when she was a child. Ten years ago, she saved Kazuma from being bullied. Although a kind person at heart, Misao blames Kazuma for her brother's death and makes multiple attempts to kill him, even going so far as to hire a sniper. All of her attempts fail and, lost in despair, she becomes a pawn in Michael's plan to take Kazuma down. In the end, Kazuma convinces her to atone for her sins by living on, and she is instructed by Jūgo to retire to a convent.
Tsui-Ling (翠鈴, Tsuoi Rin, Cuìlíng)
Voiced by: Yui Makino (Japanese); Leah Clark (English)
The girl from Kazuma's past whom he was unable to save. She was sacrificed by the head of the Armagest, Erwin Leszaar, to summon a demon. Rhodes used a spell to gather her remaining essence into a being he called Lapis. Before her sacrifice, she and Kazuma worked in a restaurant and were in love. In the last episode Lapis states that her last thoughts were that she wished Kazuma was dead. Whether this is the truth or a lie meant to cause Kazuma pain is unknown (Kazuma notes that she may have said this out of spite towards his inability to save her). As Lapis, she is trained in anti-mage fighting.
Catherine McDonald (キャッサリン マクドナルド, Kyassarin Makudonarudo)
Voiced by: Chiaki Takahashi (Japanese); Caitlin Glass (English)
A member of an American family of Enjutsushi, especially skilled in creating and controlling spirit beasts to harness flames. She originally came to Japan to defeat Ayano and take her family's sacred treasure, Enraiha, but decided to stay after she was defeated. She develops feelings for Kazuma after he trains her for her second fight against Ayano. She manipulates myriads of spirits into a single virtual persona which grants her tremendous power. While seemingly capable of creating different spirit beasts, her favorite is Metatron, an angel-like statue equipped with a sword. Kazuma has observed and mentioned that her fighting style is similar to Ayano's, referring to their simplistic and direct attacks, which lack finesse, strategy or tactics. As Ayano's rival in Enjutsushi and for Kazuma's "love," Catherine refuses to beaten in either.
Li Lonyue (李朧月, Ri Ronyue, Lǐ Lóngyuè)
Despite the fact that he appears to be a bishōnen of similar age to Ren, and his claim of being a Taoist-in-training, he is, in reality, a Taoist immortal whose age can be measured in centuries. Lonyue came to Japan to retrieve artifacts stolen from his master, befriending Ren along the way. After recovering the lost artifacts, he opted to stay in Japan because he was bored. Lonyue, like Kazuma, teases and manipulates others in order to accomplish his goals.
Lonyue has the ability to control and manipulate his surroundings at will due his mastery of the way of Tao. His true powers are never revealed, but Kazuma is shown to be genuinely afraid of fighting Lonyue again, since Lonyue is the first opponent against whom Kazuma has lost a fight since his training ended. Even though he has become a Contractor, Kazuma is not confident in winning against him.
Lonyue has only appeared in the Kaze no Stigma: Ignition side stories.
Kanon Suzuhara (鈴原 花音, Suzuhara Kanon)
Voiced by: Ayumi Tsuji (Japanese); Jad Saxton (English)
Kanon is Ren's classmate who has a romantic interest in him. Despite having quite a pushy and bratty attitude at times, Kanon is shown to have a very caring personality, except when it comes to competing with Tatsuya for Ren's attention.
Tatsuya Serizawa (芹沢 達也, Serizawa Tatsuya)
Voiced by: Jun Fukuyama (Japanese); Todd Haberkorn (English)
He is another of Ren's classmates and also his friend. He and Kanon always fight to stay with Ren. In Tatsuya's case, to do things that friends do, and in Kanon's case, to do things that couples do.
Xiaolei Yuan
Known as the Yuan Prince, Xiaolei is a Fujutsu practitioner from China belonging to the Yuan family, a famous family of wind mages, and holder of Kokusen, the sacred treasure of the wind (like Enraiha is for fire). The Yuan family was wiped out by evil mages who wanted to collect the 4 sacred treasures of the spirit world (Earth, Wind, Fire, Water). When the Yuan family refused to cooperate they were slaughtered leaving a 13-year-old Xiaolei as the only survivor. Xiaolei came to Japan to form an alliance with the Kannagi and so gain revenge. It is later revealed that Xiaolei is actually female. Kazuma and Ayano help her deal with her pain and at the end of the novel, Kazuma uses his Contractor powers to save her from dying.
Tiana (ティアナ, Tiana)
Voiced by: Kei Shindo (Japanese); Carrie Savage (English)
A mischievous fairy known as a pixie who appears in episode 8 and was hiding in Ayano and Ren's school and scaring a few students, she makes a cherry blossom bloom for "a dying man's last wish". She then asks Kazuma to get the fairy's stolen property back since he has a contract with the wind god she feels he is obligated to.

=== Antagonists ===
Ryūya Kazamaki (風巻 流也, Kazamaki Ryūya)

Voiced by: Dai Matsumoto (Japanese); Christopher Sabat (English)

Son of Hyoue Kazamaki, leader of the Fūga Clan, which served the Kannagi for the last 300 years. In an elaborate plot to release the Fūga Clan's master spirit and take revenge on the Kannagi for the humiliation received since then, Ryūya's body becomes the host for a powerful yoma. After Ryūya engages with Kazuma and Ayano, the yoma fully emerges, and takes complete control of Ryūya body and mind in order to unleash its full power. Eventually, Ryūya and the yoma are killed in a joint attack by Kazuma and Ayano.
Michael Harley (ミカエルハーリ, Mikaeru Hāri)
Voiced by: Eri Kitamura (Japanese); Joel McDonald (English)
A young boy from the Stars of Sagacity, an organization related to Kazuma's past and Tsui-Ling's death. He uses Misao's anger at Kazuma to ensnare her into aiding his plans. In truth, he only uses her as a medium, in order to obtain enough yoki, or life energy, to kill Kazuma. After creating a dragon with Misao's collected life energy, he attacks Kazuma, Ayano and Ren, but is ultimately destroyed by Ayano's Shinen-empowered Enraiha.
Bernhardt Rhodes (ヴェルンハルト・ローデス, Verunharuto Rōdesu)
Voiced by: Kenyu Horiuchi (Japanese); John Swasey (English)
The chairman of Armagest, a powerful organization of modern magic users. He holds a grudge against Kazuma for killing his master, Erwin Leszaar, the man who sacrificed Tsui-Ling.
Lapis (ラピス, Rapisu)
Voiced by: Yui Makino (Japanese); Leah Clark (English)
The entity that was made in Tsui-Ling's image by Bernhardt. Lapis carries a big crystal broad sword, but wields it with ease, and is able to match Ayano in swordplay. It is revealed in episode 21 of the anime that Lapis has a heart, so she can feel the pleasure in hurting others, among other emotions.
Erwin (エルウィン, Erūin)
Voiced by: Katsuyuki Konishi (Japanese); J. Michael Tatum (English)
The previous leader of Armagest before his right-hand man, Bernhardt Rhodes, took over. Four years before the start of the series, he kidnapped Tsui-Ling from Kazuma so that Armagest can use her as a human sacrifice to summon a powerful demon. Kazuma tried to stop him and save Tsui-Ling, but he was no match for Erwin's powers. Erwin successfully sacrifice Tsui-Ling to the monster so he can gain its power. As he was about to kill Kazuma, Kazuma made a contract with the Spirit king of the Wind and obtained the great wind powers. Erwin was then killed by Kazuma's new powers.

== Media ==
=== Light novel ===
Kaze no Stigma began as a light novel series, written by Takahiro Yamato and illustrated by Hanamaru Nanto, serialized in the Japanese seinen light novel magazine Dragon Magazine, published by Fujimi Shobō, a subsidiary of Kadokawa Shoten. It began serialization in January 2002. Twelve bound volumes have been published—six main volumes and six short story compilations. The latest main volume was released on October 20, 2005, and the latest short story volume went on sale in Japan on March 20, 2010. The author of the light novels, Takahiro Yamato, died on July 20, 2009, leaving the series incomplete.

=== Manga ===
A manga series illustrated by Neko Miyakai began serialization in the Japanese shōnen manga magazine Monthly Dragon Age on April 9, 2007, and ended on March 6, 2008. Two bound volumes have been published by Fujimi Shobō.

=== Anime ===
Gonzo's Kaze no Stigma animated TV series aired on Japanese broadcasting channels between April 12, 2007, and September 21, 2007, containing twenty-four episodes; it aired in a late night slot. The series was directed by Junichi Sakata. The first DVD release of Kaze no Stigma was released on August 24, 2007. It was released by Funimation in 2009 starting with part 1. The anime's opening theme is "Blast of Wind" performed by Saori Kiuji, lyrics by Chiaki Ishikawa and Mitsuko Komuro, composed by Kazumi Mitome and Akino Arai. The first ending theme is "Hitorikiri no Sora" by Saori Kiuji and the second ending theme is "Matataki no Kiwoku" (瞬きのキヲク) by Ayumi Fujimura, Yuka Inokuchi and Shizuka Itō.

The series has been licensed by FUNimation Entertainment in North America. They released the first DVD volume in 2009.

The major difference between the novel and the anime is the significantly darker tone in the novels. The character of Kazuma is much darker in the novels, which depicts him mercilessly killing most of the antagonistic characters. In the anime, Kazuma is usually depicted as only injuring or incapacitating his opponents, while their actual deaths are usually the result of their own schemes backfiring on them. Some scenes involving gruesome deaths were simply excluded from the anime.

=== Role-playing game ===
Kaze no Stigma RPG.

A Kaze no Stigma RPG, published by Fujimi Shobō, went on sale in Japan in June 2007. The game is designed by Kiyomune Miwa, and uses the Standard RPG System.
