= Glossary of video game terms =

Since the origin of video games in the early 1970s, the video game industry, the players, and surrounding culture have spawned a wide range of technical jargons and slang terms.

== 0–9 ==
1CC
Abbreviation of one-credit completion or one-coin clear. To complete an arcade (or arcade-style) game without using continues.
1-up
An object that gives the player an extra life (or attempt) in games where the player has a limited number of chances to complete a game or level.
100%
To collect all collectibles or to also obtain all achievements (see below) within a game, either indicated within games as a percentage counter or determined by consensus of the community of players.
1v1
An abbreviation of 1 versus 1, denoting two players battling against each other. Can be extended to any player versus player grouping, such as '2v2' to mean two teams of two battling each other, or "1v4" to refer to a team of four players against one (as seen in asymmetrical gameplay).
2D graphics
2D graphics refers to the rendering of visual elements using two-dimensional graphics primitives and bitmaps, commonly used in applications such as video games.
2.5D graphics

Graphic rendering technique of three-dimensional objects set in a two-dimensional plane of movement. Often includes games where some objects are still rendered as sprites.
360 no-scope
A 360 no-scope usually refers to a trick shot in a first or third-person shooter video game in which one player kills another with a sniper rifle by first spinning a full circle and then quickly shooting without looking through the scope.
3D graphics
Graphic rendering technique featuring three-dimensional objects.
4K resolution

An aspect ratio of digital display devices such as televisions and monitors, supporting up to 3840 × 2160 pixel (roughly 4 kilopixels wide) resolutions.
4X
A genre of strategic video games, short for "eXplore, eXpand, eXploit, and eXterminate". Such games are usually complicated, involving extensive diplomacy, technology trees, and win conditions.
8-bit
A descriptor for hardware or software that arose during the third generation of video game consoles, targeting 8-bit computer architecture.
16-bit
A descriptor for hardware or software that arose during the fourth generation of video game consoles, targeting 16-bit computer architecture.
32-bit
A descriptor for hardware or software that arose during the fifth generation of video game consoles, targeting 32-bit computer architecture.
64-bit
A descriptor for hardware or software that arose during the fifth generation of video game consoles, targeting 64-bit computer architecture.

== A ==
AAA

A high-budget game with a large development team. AAA games are usually multiplatform or are first-party, have multimillion-dollar budgets, and expect to sell millions of copies.
Abandonware
A game that is forgotten about or abandoned by its developers for any number of reasons, including copyright issues.
Ace
Usually used within first-person shooters, where a single player manages to eliminate the entire opposing team by themselves while their teammates are alive. Can also be used to describe situations where a player manages to complete a possibly difficult section of game flawlessly. Comparable to pentakill in competitive games with teams made up of 5 players, such as MOBAs.
Achievement

Meta-goals defined outside a game's parameters. May be external achievements such as those on Xbox Live or Steam.
Achievement hunter
A player who attempts to collect all achievements in a game. Achievement hunters tend to be completionists.
Act
Sometimes used to refer to individual levels or groups of levels that make up a larger world or storyline. Rarely refers to a downloadable game intended to be part of a larger series which functions as a single game series and gameplay-wise.
Action game
A game genre emphasizing hand–eye coordination, reflexes, timing, and other physical skills. It includes fighting games, shooters, and platformers.
Action point (AP)
A subunit of a player's turn. For example, a game may allow an action to occur only so long as the player has sufficient 'action points' to complete the action.
Action role-playing game (ARPG)
A genre of role-playing video game where battle actions are performed in real-time instead of a turn-based mechanic.
Actions per minute (APM)
The total number of actions that a player can perform in a minute, commonly used as a metric for player skill in real-time strategy games.
Adaptive music
Game music which changes and reacts to the actions of the player and state of the game in an attempt to better reflect the game atmosphere.
Adaptive AI
A form of artificial intelligence that dynamically adapts gameplay, game environments, and non-player character (NPC) behavior based on player performance, behavior, and interactions to provide a personalized gaming experience.
Add-on
Adds
A term used commonly in role-playing video games, MMORPGs and beat-'em-ups, referring to the "additional enemies" called in by bosses during encounters.
Advance and secure (AAS)
A player versus player team-based game mode used in tactical first-person shooter games where the players on opposing teams must capture certain predefined points of interest in a game environment in a certain preset order.
Adventure game
A game genre which emphasizes puzzles, exploration and narrative.
AFK
Meaning "away from keyboard". Generally said through a chat function in online multiplayer games when a player intends to be temporarily unavailable.
Agency
Related to the psychological term of agency, agency or player agency in video games refers to means used by developers to implement the game to make it feel like the player is in control of the game with the game reacting to the player's actions, even though the game itself is fixed in its approach.
Aggro
An abbreviation of 'aggravation' or 'aggression'. 'Causing aggro' or 'aggroing' in a video game means to attract hostile attention from NPCs or enemies to attack the player-character. 'Managing aggro' involves keeping aggressive NPCs from overwhelming the player or party. The term may be facetiously used in reference to irritated bystanders ('wife aggro', 'mother aggro', etc).
Aim assist
See auto-aim
Aimbot
A first-person shooter cheat that allows a player's weapon to automatically aim at a target. In most cases, the aiming reticle locks onto a target within the player's line of sight and the player only has to pull the trigger. Aimbots are one of the most popular cheats in multiplayer FPS, used since 1996's Quake.
Aiming down sights (ADS)

Refers to the common alternate method of firing a gun in a first-person shooter (FPS) game, typically activated by the right mouse button. The real-life analogue is when a person raises a rifle up and places the stock just inside the shoulder area, and leans their head down so they can see in a straight line along the top of the rifle, through both of the iron sights or a scope, if equipped. In most games, this greatly increases accuracy, but can limit vision, situational awareness, mobility, and require a small amount of time to change the weapon position.
Alpha release
An initial, incomplete version of a game. Alpha versions are usually released early in the development process to test a game's most critical functionality and prototype design concepts.
Alt
Short for 'alternate', the focus on gameplay/progression/development of other available characters (or classes) in a game after one has completed the development of a favored 'main' character.
May also refer to an 'alt' or alternative account, compared to a player's 'main' account
Always-on DRM
A type of digital rights management (DRM) that typically requires a connection to the Internet while playing the game.
Analog stick

A small variation of a joystick, usually placed on a game controller to allow a player more fluent 2-dimensional input than is possible with a D-pad.
Animatic
A partially animated storyboard with sound effects used during early game development.
Animation priority
A type of gameplay mechanic in which the playable character's animations have priority over the player's input; in other words, if the player begins an action with a long animation, the animation must play out first before the player can then enter a new command, and attempting to enter a new command will have no effect. Games like the Dark Souls and Monster Hunter series are based on gameplay using animation priority.
Anti-Aim
A type of cheat commonly found in first-person shooter games that makes it difficult or impossible for the user's hitboxes to be hit. This can be achieved many ways, but the most common ones are rapidly moving the user's hitboxes, flipping hitboxes (usually backwards or sideways), and sending false packets to the server.
Anti-RPG
A role-playing video game that subverts the typical elements of such games. The term was coined by the video game Moon: Remix RPG Adventure.
Any%
A type of speedrun in which the player's objective is to reach the end of the game as quickly as possible without any qualifiers or limitations, including using known bugs and glitches in the game to do so.
AoE
1. See area of effect
2. Abbreviation of Age of Empires
Arachnophobia mode
Arachnophobia mode is an accesibility setting in videogames that obstructs the appearance of spiders, allowing for players with arachnophobia to access the game.
Arcade game
A coin-operated ("coin-op") video game usually contained in an upright, tabletop (cocktail or candy cabinet) or semi-enclosed sit-down cabinet. Popular primarily during the late 1970s to 1990s in the West, and still popular in the East to the present day, arcade machines continue to be manufactured and sold worldwide.
Area
Area of effect (AoE)

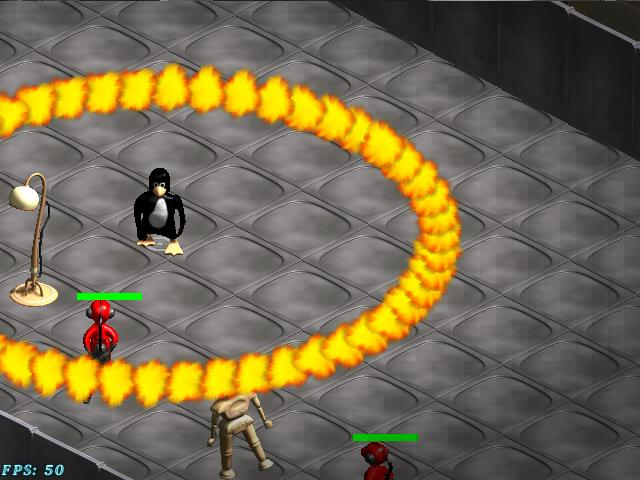
Screenshot from FreedroidRPG showing an "area of effect", or AoE

A term used in many role-playing and strategy games to describe attacks or other effects that affect multiple targets within a specified area. For example, in the role-playing game, Dungeons & Dragons, a fireball spell will deal damage to anyone within a certain radius of where it strikes. In most tactical strategy games artillery weapons have an area of effect that will damage anyone within a radius of the strike zone. Often the effect is stronger on the target than on anything else hit. See also: Splash damage

Area of effect can also refer to spells and abilities that are non-damaging. For example, a powerful healing spell may affect anyone within a certain range of the caster (often only if they are a member of the caster's party). Some games also have what are referred to as "aura" abilities that will affect anyone in the area around the person with the ability. For example, many strategy games have hero or officer units that can improve the morale and combat performance of friendly units around them. The inclusion of AoE elements in game mechanics can increase the role of strategy, especially in turn-based games. The player has to place units wisely to mitigate the possibly devastating effects of a hostile area of effect attack; however, placing units in a dense formation could result in gains that outweigh the increased AoE damage received.

Point-blank area of effect (PBAoE) is a less-used term for when the affected region is centered on the character performing the ability, rather than at a location of the player's choosing.
ARPG
Arena mode
A side game mode, mostly found in some action-adventure games, in which a player-controlled character is placed in a closed area and challenged to defeat enemies using combat abilities.
Arena fighter
A 3D fighting game with a ring out as the victory condition.
Arena FPS
Arena shooters that use the first-person perspective.
Arena shooter
Shooting games that are typically based on fast-paced gameplay and in a limited map or level space.
Artificial Intelligence (AI)
Algorithms used to generate responsive, adaptive or intelligent game behavior, primarily in non-player characters. Distinct from the computing science concept of 'artificial intelligence'.
Assault mode
A game mode in which one team tries to attack (or capture) specific areas or control points and the other team tries to defend those points. Compare to an advance and secure game mode.
Asset flipping
The practice of creating a game using 'free' art and audio assets, either from an online marketplace or the default stock of assets included with many game engines. Asset-flips are often of very poor quality designed to catch onto a currently popular theme to turn a quick profit. It mimics the practice of flipping in real estate markets.
Asymmetric gameplay
Cooperative or competitive multiplayer games in which each player will have a different experience arising from differences in gameplay, controls, or in-game character options that are part of the game. This is in contrast to symmetric gameplay where each player will have the same experience, such as in the game Pong. Asymmetric gameplay often arises in competitive games where one player's character is far overpowered but outnumbered by other players who are all competing against them, such as in Pac-Man Vs. Asymmetric gameplay can also arise in multiplayer online battle arenas (MOBAs) and hero shooters, where each player selects a different hero or character class with different gameplay abilities from others.
Asynchronous gameplay
Competitive multiplayer games where the players do not have to be participating at the same time. Such games are usually turn-based, with each player planning a strategy for the upcoming turn, and then having the game resolve all actions of that turn once each player has submitted their strategies.
Attract mode

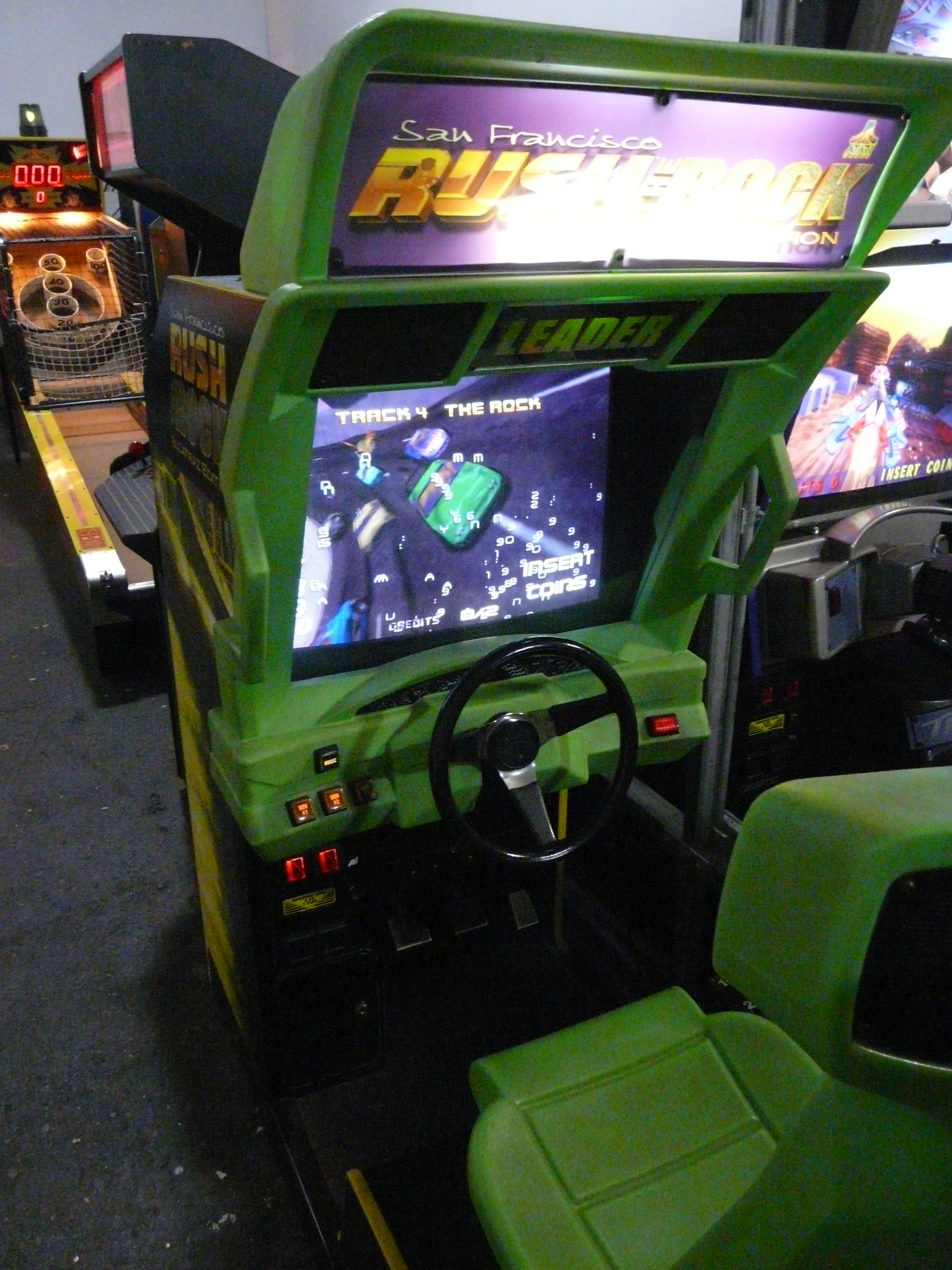
The attract mode for the arcade game San Francisco Rush: The Rock showcasing one of the racetracks available to play in the game

A demonstration of a video game that is displayed when the game is not being played.

Originally built into arcade games, the main purpose of the attract mode is to entice passers-by to play the game. It usually displays the game's title screen, the game's story (if it has one), its high score list, sweepstakes (on some games) and the message "Game Over" or "Insert Coin" over or in addition to a computer-controlled demonstration of gameplay. In the Atari 8-bit computers of the late 1970s and 1980s, the term attract mode was sometimes used to denote a simple screensaver that slowly cycled the display colors to prevent phosphor burn-in when no input had been received for several minutes. Attract modes demonstrating gameplay are common in current home video games.

Attract mode is found in most coin-operated entertainment like pinball machines, stacker machines, and other games.
Augmented reality (AR)
Supplementing a real-world environment with computer-generated perceptual information with matching alignment to the real world, which may add to or mask the physical environment. Augmented reality alters the perception of a physical environment, whereas virtual reality replaces the physical environment with a simulated one.
Auto battler
Also known as "auto chess", a subgenre of strategy games that feature chess-like elements where players place characters on a grid-shaped battlefield during a preparation phase, who then fight the opposing team's characters without any further direct input from the player. It was created and popularized by Dota Auto Chess in early 2019.
Auto-aim

A game mechanic built into some games to decrease the level of difficulty by locking onto or near targets for faster aiming. Games utilize "hard" or "soft" aim settings to respectively either lock directly onto an enemy or assist the player's aim towards the enemy while giving some freedom of precision.
Auto-run
A system in video games that causes the player-character to move forward without input from the user. The system is predominantly used in platform games, as well as being a toggleable feature in some open world and MMO games where users may need to travel long distances without the assistance of fast travel systems.
Autosave
A saving function in many video games that saves the current progress without the player's input, often after completing a mission, level, or winning a match. These points are called save points.
Avatar
The player's representation in the game world..

== B ==
B2P
Buy-to-play, see games as a product.
B-hopping

Repeated use of the jump button while moving, which increases the character's momentum in some games. Originally a glitch in Quake engine games, a large portion of games have implemented it as a feature and gamers have taken into doing this.
Backfill

A system of many competitive team-based multiplayer games that automatically finds a new player based on their skill level in an already existing game in case of one player leaving it. Usually only seen in casual modes to keep competitive integrity in ranked games.
Bad ending
In a game with multiple endings, a "bad ending" is an ending that deliberately provides an incomplete, undesirable, or noncanonical resolution to the storyline.
Badge

An indicator of accomplishment or skill, showing that the player has performed some particular action within the game.
Balance
Aspects of a multi-player game that keep it fair for all players. This usually refers to balance between characters (or any other choices made before battle) and options (which occur in battle). Balance between choices made before battle usually means that no character is likely to dominate another opponent, while balance between options usually refers to every option having a viable counter, preventing gameplay from degenerating to using a single option with minor variations. The issue of balanced gameplay is a heavily debated matter among most games' player communities.
Ban

In online games, the act of kicking a player from the server, and then employing means of preventing them from returning. This is usually accomplished using a blacklist. In some games, done in "ban waves" against cheaters to obfuscate how they were recognized as cheating in the game.
Ban wave
See above.
Banner
An opportunity in a gacha game where players can spend their resources for a chance to obtain a given character or item etc., that belongs to a specific group, or a character or item, etc. in particular. Depending on the game, it can be available indefinitely or have a time limit. The latter kind most often increases the probability of getting specific characters or items.
Battle pass
A type of in-game monetization that provides additional content for a game through a tiered system, rewarding the player with in-game items by playing the game and completing specific challenges.
Battle royale game
A video game genre that blends elements of survival games with last-man-standing gameplay. Players search for equipment while eliminating competitors in a shrinking safe zone. Usually there are many more players involved than in other kinds of multi-player games.
Best-in-slot (BiS)
Any item or ability that can be considered the best possible option in a given slot. This can vary between players and playstyles, but commonly, any specific playstyle is likely to have either a single or a small set of items considered to be the best. This may be due to favorable effects, good match-ups against most opponents, or high stats.
Beta release

An early release of a video game, following its alpha release, where the game developer seeks feedback from players and testers to remove bugs prior to the product's commercial release. Games are usually almost finished at the beta stage.
Blacklist
In online games, a list of player information (such as player ID or IP address) that the server checks for when admitting a player. By default, players are allowed to enter, but if they match information on the blacklist, they are barred from entry. The opposite is a whitelist, where the server bars players by default but allows players matching the whitelist. Blacklists and whitelists can be used in tandem, barring even whitelisted players if they try to log in via a blacklisted IP address, for example.
Blockstun
A period of time between a character blocking an attack and returning to their idle stance.
BM
"Bad manners"; conduct that is not considered "cheating" but may be seen as unsportsmanlike or disrespectful. Some games may elect to punish badly behaved players by assessing game penalties, temporarily blocking them from re-entering play, or banishing them to a playing environment populated solely by other badly behaved players. What constitutes bad manners is subjective and may be hard to gather a consensus on.
Board
Boomer shooter
A first-person shooter designed to resemble older games in the genre such as Doom and Quake. The name is derived from the baby boomer generation, often shortened to simply boomer, which in turn is used to describe things that are old in general.
Booster pack
A random assortment of cards in digital collectible card games that players can buy or earn to add to their deck.
Boosting
In online multiplayer games that include ranked competitive play, boosting is where a player with a low-ranked level has a more-skilled player use their account to improve the low-ranked character to higher levels, or other improvements and benefits for their account.
Bonus stage
A special level in which the player has a chance to earn extra points or power-ups, often in the form of a mini-game.
Borderless fullscreen windowed
An option featured in many modern PC games and moddable into others in which a game appears fullscreen but is actually running in a maximized window. Since the game does not take full control of the output device, it confers benefits such as seamless task switching and automatic vertical synchronization.
Boss
A significantly powerful opponent non-player character and computer-controlled enemy in a video game that is typically much more difficult to defeat compared to normal enemies, often at the end of a level or a game.
Bot
Short for robot. A non-playable character which is controlled by an artificial intelligence (AI). The player may compete against or work with a bot to complete objectives. Is also a derogatory term that implies a player is less effective than an AI-controlled character.
Bottomless pit
A hazard common in platform and action games, which consists of a deep hole or void with no visible bottom, presumably leading to a fatal drop. The player-character falling into this void typically results in an instant death (and the loss of a life) for the player, regardless of how much health the character had; some games may instead take away a percentage of the character's health before respawning them nearby. Bottomless pits can also serve as obstacles that can be overcome by using abilities or finding alternate routes.
Buff
1. An effect placed on a video game character that beneficially increases one or more of their statistics or characteristics for a temporary period.
2. A change intended to strengthen a particular item, tactic, ability, or character, ostensibly for balancing purposes.
Buildcrafting
The ability in games to define the player-characters abilities by selecting appropriate gear, equipment, and accessories to optimize and maximize the character's performance in the game. The end results, known as builds, then are frequently shared to other players through various means.
Build order

An optimal sequence of player actions in a building-based strategy game, dictating what option should be constructed in what order.
Bullet hell
A type of shoot 'em up where the player must dodge a large or overwhelming bombardment of projectiles.
Bullet sponge
Any enemy that appears to require more firepower than would be considered realistic or reasonable to defeat. This is an allusion to how the enemy can absorb bullets much like a sponge absorbs liquids. For example, an enemy soldier in a first-person shooter that requires several full magazines of ammunition to defeat, in comparison to other soldier types that are defeated in a handful of shots, would be a bullet sponge.
Bullshot
A portmanteau of bullshit and screenshot, referring to the misrepresentation of a final product's technical or artistic quality by artificially enhancing promotional images or video footage.
Button mashing
1. The pressing of different button combinations in rapid succession to perform or attempt to perform special moves, typically with little rhyme or reason. This technique is most often encountered in fighting games, especially among weaker players.
2. The rapid pressing of a single button to accomplish a task, especially in minigames. Sometimes, this requires the rapid pressing of two buttons simultaneously, or rapidly pressing any button.
Breach
Common name for the value that dictates how much stun a weapon deals.

== C ==
Campaign mode

A series of game levels intended to tell a linear story; some campaigns feature multiple 'paths', with the player's actions deciding which path the story will follow and affecting which choices are available to the player at a later point.
Camping
1. Where a player stays in one place – typically a fortified high-traffic location – for an extended period of time and waits to ambush other players. Many players consider camping a form of cheating or, at best, griefing. It is most common in first-person shooter games, but is also frequent in fighting games with projectile-heavy characters.
2. The act of waiting around a rare mob or player's spawn point, usually in MMOs. This may be known as spawn-camping or spawn-trapping.
Camping a player's spawn point for an easy kill is deeply frowned upon and in many games is considered a bannable offense.
Capture the flag (CTF)
A common game mode in multiplayer video games, where the goal is to capture and retrieve a flag from the opposing side's territory while defending the flag in one's own territory.
Career mode
A mode of gameplay that involves taking control of a single character and guiding the character through a structured career. The mode is commonly used in sports games, where it is referred to by various names such as "Be a Pro", "superstar mode", "My Player", and "Road to the Show", in which a player controls the career of a single athlete.
Carry
In team-based video games, when a player disproportionately contributes to the success of their team. For example, Team A's sole remaining player defeating the rest of Team B, thus saving Team A from a close defeat, would be considered carrying, as would one player on Team A having the most kills among the rest of their team. The term is usually but not always interpreted as indirect slander towards the rest of the team, though the term may also be used generally. Carrying may also be a method experienced players use to win rounds when the rest of their team are less experienced or less efficient at completing tasks; this may entail taking on enemy combatants alone, or using teammates as a distraction while completing objectives for the round.
Cartridge tilting
Deliberately inducing glitches and other strange behaviour in cartridge-based games by tilting the cartridge slightly in its slot in the console, enough for the connection to be altered but not completely severed. Cartridge tilting creates similar effects to using a corruptor, and may include such glitches as character models becoming distorted, extremely loud noises and in particularly severe cases, both the game and the console itself may crash.
Casual gaming
Playing video games on an infrequent and spontaneous basis without a long-term commitment. Casual video games are distinguished by a low learning curve and ease of access, often web-based for mobile phones or personal computers. Most casual games have simplified controls, with one or two buttons dominating play. Casual games can normally be played in small periods of time, and may not have a save feature.
Challenge mode
A game mode offered beyond the game's normal play mode that tasks the player(s) to replay parts of the game or special levels under specific conditions that are not normally present or required in the main game, such as finishing a level within a specific time, or using only one type of weapon. If a game doesn't feature a 'challenge mode', players will often create self-imposed challenges by forbidding or restricting the use of certain game mechanics.
Character
See player-character and non-player character
Character class
A job or profession that comes with a set of abilities as well as positive and negative attributes. Most common in role-playing games, a character's class helps to define their playstyle as well as the role the character plays in a team based game. Often as players gain experience with a class they learn new abilities related to their chosen profession and some games allow players to change their character's class or become proficient in multiple classes. Some examples of archetypal character classes include warrior (strength and defense), thief (speed and stealth), wizard (magic and intelligence), and priest or healer (healing and buffing allies). A popular example of a class-changing system is the Job System in the Final Fantasy series.
Character creator
An ingame method to customize a character to the player's preferred appearance and abilities before starting the game, most commonly used in role-playing games.
Character select screen

A concept in games with multiple characters, a screen with names or pictures of all playable (and secret) characters with the possibility of stat listings.
Charge shot
A shot that can be charged up so that a stronger attack can be dealt, but requiring more time. Usually performed by holding the shot button.
Cheat
A game code that allows the player to beat the game or acquire benefits without earning them. Cheats are used by designers to test the game during development and are often left in the release version.
Cheating
To play the game unfairly; giving an unfair advantage via illegitimate means.
Checkpoint
An area in a level from which the player will start the level from next time they die, rather than having to start the level over. Checkpoints typically remain in place until the player completes the level or gets a Game Over.
Cheese (or cheesing)
Cheese(ing) refers to a tactic in a video game that may be considered cheap, unfair, or overly easy, requiring no skill by others as to otherwise complete a difficult task. What may account as cheese depends on the type of game. Its origin traces back to players of Street Fighter II who would frequently use the same combo move over and over again to defeat their opponent. In multiplayer games like MOBAs or hero shooters, certain team compositions of heroes are considered cheese compositions for how easily they can defeat most other team compositions. In other games, cheese can refer to exploiting glitches and other bugs to make difficult gameplay sections easy.
Cheevo
Chiptune
Music composed for the microchip-based audio hardware of early home computers and gaming consoles. Due to the technical limitations of earlier video game hardware, chiptune came to define a style of its own, known for its "soaring flutelike melodies, buzzing square wave bass, rapid arpeggios, and noisy gated percussion".
Choke
1. When a player/team that is currently winning or otherwise playing well performs unexpectedly poorly.
2. A feature of a playable map that funnels players and might restrict mechanics like movement (chokepoint).
Cinematic
Circle strafing
An advanced method of movement in many first-person shooter (FPS) games where the user utilizes both thumb sticks (console) or mouse and keyboard controls (PC) to maintain a constant circular motion around an enemy, while maintaining a relatively steady aim on that target. This practice minimizes incoming fire from the target's teammates, as any misses are likely to hit and harm their teammate.
Clapped
A slang term referring to someone who was swiftly defeated in a multiplayer video game, especially first-person shooter games.
Clan

An organized group of players who regularly play multiplayer video games.
Clicker game
A game genre where clicking (or tapping, on smart devices) the screen repeatedly is the fundamental gameplay mechanic. Clicker games typically award the player in-game currency or points for their clicks, which can be used to upgrade their abilities, such as automating their clicking, allowing them to score more points. Games such as Cookie Clicker popularized the genre.
Clipping
1. Programming used to ensure that the player stays within the physical boundaries of the game world, bypassing collision detection.
2. A 3D graphics process which determines if an object is visible and "clips" any obscured parts before drawing it. See also clipping (computer graphics).
Clock/clocked
To achieve a score so high it resets the in-game score counter back to 0, often used in older arcade games. More commonly used nowadays to express the (absolute) 100% completion of a game. Also see rolling the score.
Clone
1. A game that is similar in design to another game in its genre (e.g., a Doom clone or a Grand Theft Auto clone). Sometimes used in a derogatory fashion to refer to an inferior 'ripoff' of a more successful title.
2. A character that plays nearly identically to another.
Closed beta
A beta testing period where only specific people have access to the game.
Cloud gaming
A cloud gaming server runs the game, receiving controller input actions from and streaming audio and video to the player's thin client.
Cloud save
The player's saved game is stored at a remote server. This may provide a backup, or enable access from a different game system. See also cross-save.
Clutch

Being able to perform exceptionally well in a high-stakes situation, or have certain events occur at the right time in a very important or critical moment, in particular in a way that changes the outcome of the game; scoring a victory for your team when it was on the verge of defeat.
CMS
Coin-op
Collateral

In a shooter, a shot which passes through one target and hits one or more others. Typically possible only with certain weapons, such as sniper rifles.
Collectible
An item that can be collected by a player, which may or may not confer a positive benefit, such as increasing their character's maximum health. Typically found in games with a campaign mode, collectibles may increase such game's replay value by placing collectibles in areas that are hidden or can only be accessed with special abilities, encouraging the player to inquisitively comb through and revisit levels to find them all, as part of 100% completion.
Collision detection
The computational task of detecting the intersection of two or more game objects.
Combo
A series of attacks strung together in quick succession, typically while an opponent is in their "getting hit" animation from the previous attack and is helpless to defend themselves. Combos are a staple of fighting games, introduced in beat-'em-ups such as Renegade and Double Dragon, and becoming more dynamic in Final Fight and Street Fighter II.
Competitive gaming
Completionist
A particular kind of video game player who focuses on achieving 100% completion in the games they play.
Compulsion loop
A cycle of gameplay elements designed to keep the player invested in the game, typically through a feedback system involving in-game rewards that open up more gameplay opportunities.
Console
A video game hardware unit that typically connects to a video screen and controllers, along with other hardware. Unlike personal computers, a console typically has a fixed hardware configuration defined by its manufacturer and cannot be customized. Sometimes includes handheld consoles, to differentiate them from computers, arcade machines, and cell phones.
Console generations
A set of video game consoles in direct competition for market share in a given era. The set, as a generation, is obsoleted at the introduction of the "next generation" or "next gen".
Console wars
Refers to competition for video game console market dominance and, in specific, to the rivalry between Sega and Nintendo throughout most of the 1980s and 1990s. The analogy also extends to competition in later console generations, particularly the PlayStation and Xbox brands.
Construction and management simulation (CMS)
A video game genre that involves planning and managing a population of citizens in towns, cities, or other population centers. In such games, the player rarely has direct control of the computer-controlled citizens and can only influence them through planning.
Content rating
Classifying video games according to suitability-related factors such as violent or sexual content contained within a game. Some countries use industry self-regulation models to accomplish this, while others have government rating boards. Certain content ratings result in products being legally or de facto banned from sale, such as the AO (adults only) rating in the United States. While legal, such titles are not stocked by retailers and will not be certified for release by major console makers such as Sony and Microsoft.
Continue

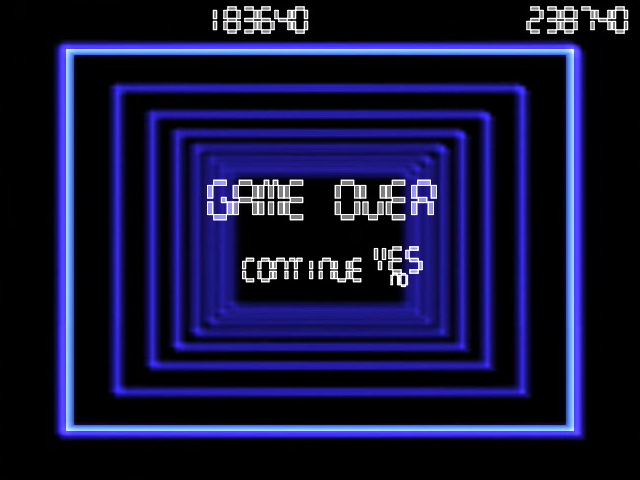
A7Xpg gives the player the opportunity to continue playing after losing their last life.

The option to keep playing the game after all of the player's lives have been lost, rather than ending the game and restarting from the very beginning. There may or may not be a penalty for doing this, such as losing a certain number of points or being unable to access bonus stages.

In arcade games, when a player loses or fails an objective, they will generally be shown a "continue countdown" screen, in which the player has a limited amount of time (usually 10, 15, or 20 seconds) to insert additional coins in order to continue the game from the point where it had ended; deciding not to continue will result in the displaying of a game over screen.

The continue feature was added to arcade games in the early 1980s as a way to earn more money from players. The first arcade game to have a continue feature was Fantasy, and the first home console cartridge to have this feature was the Atari 2600 version of Vanguard. As a result of the continue feature, games started to have stories and definite endings; however, those games were designed so that it would be nearly impossible to get to the end of the game without continuing. Salen and Zimmerman argue that the continue feature in games such as Gauntlet was an outlet for conspicuous consumption.

In more modern times, continues have also been used in a number of free-to-play games, especially mobile games, where the player is offered a chance to pay a certain amount of premium currency to continue after failing or losing. One example is Temple Run 2, where the price of a continue doubles after each failure, with an on-the-fly in-app purchase of the game's premium currency if required.
Control pad
Control point (CP)
A game mode which involves the team capturing each required "capture point" in order to win the round or level.
Control stick
Controller
A means of control over the console or computer on which the game is played. Specialized game controllers include the joystick, light gun, paddle, and trackball.
Conversation tree
Conversion kit
Special equipment that can be installed into an arcade machine that changes the current game it plays into another one. For example, a conversion kit can be used to reconfigure an arcade machine designed to play one game so that it would play its sequel or update instead, such as from Star Wars to The Empire Strikes Back, or from Street Fighter II: Champion Edition to Street Fighter II Turbo.
Cooldown
The minimum length of time that the player needs to wait after using an ability before they can use it again. This is commonly done for game balance so less powerful abilities remain relevant.
Co-op
Cooperative gameplay (co-op)
Multiplayer gameplay where the players work together on the same team against computer-controlled opponents or challenges.
Corruptor
A computer program used either as or in conjunction with an emulator to corrupt certain data within a ROM or ISO by a user-desired amount, causing varied effects, both visually and audibly, to a video game and its data, usually as a humorous diversion or for the sake of seeking out and documenting interesting examples, hereafter referred to as corruptions. The effects of a corruption may include: displaced or misdirected pixels in a spritemap; never-ending levels; bizarre or unexpected changes to the colour palette of characters and levels; artifacts; distorted or entirely incorrect sprites, polygons, textures, or character models; unpredictable and outlandish animations; incorrect text or dialogue trees; flickering graphics or lights; incorrect or distorted audio; inconvenient invisible walls; lack of collision detection; and other forced glitches. Corruptions often result in the game becoming unwinnable, and may also result in unusual crashes and softlocks. See also real-time corruptor and ROM hacking.
Couch co-op
A local cooperative video game that is designed to be played by multiple players on the same display screen, using split-screen.
Cover system
A game mechanic which allows the player to use walls or other features of the game's environment to take cover from oncoming ranged attacks, such as gunfire in first-person shooters. Many cover systems also allow the character to use ranged attacks in return while in cover although with an accuracy penalty.
Coyote time
A game mechanic that grants players the ability to jump for a brief period of time (typically just a few frames or fractions of a second) after leaving solid ground. Used predominantly in platform games, the mechanic is designed to give players the impression of having jumped at the last possible moment, and as a method of forgiving players who would have otherwise missed the jump. The mechanic derives its name from the Looney Tunes character Wile E. Coyote who, after running off a cliff, is well known for briefly hanging in mid-air before plummeting to the earth below. This term is also used in rhythm games for the grace period given when hitting a note late.
CPU
1. Central processing unit; the part of the computer or video game which executes the games' program.
2. A personal computer.
3. A non-player character controlled by the game software using artificial intelligence, usually serving as an opponent to the player or players.
CPU versus CPU
Cracked
1. Software that has had its anti-piracy protections removed prior to being illegally distributed. See: Software cracking
2. Being extremely good at something.
Crafting
A game mechanic that allows the player-character to construct game items, such as armor, weapons or medicine from combinations of other items. Most MMOGs feature a crafting system.
Creative mode
A mode that turns a game, typically one with a construction mechanic, into a form of virtual toy, stripping away any restrictions such as progression-gated content or dangers such as enemies or hazards.
Credit-feeding
To complete an arcade game by using as many continues as possible. Prevalent in action games or shooters where the player is revived at the exact moment their character died during their previous credit. Some home conversions (such as AES versions of Neo Geo games) tend to limit the number of credits each player is allowed to use in a playthrough as a way of preserving the challenge, while other conversions (such as the ports in the Namco Museum series) impose no such limits in order to reproduce the original version as faithfully as possible.
Critical hit

A type of strike that does more damage than usual. Normally a rare occurrence, this may indicate a special attack or a hit on the target's weak point.
Cross-buy
Ownership of a game on multiple platforms granted through a single purchase.
Cross-generation
A game released across multiple console generations.
Cross-platform
Cross-platform play
Multi-platform versions of the same online games may be played together.
Cross-progression
Similar to cross-save, when multi-platform games may share the player's current account details, including earned and purchased items, via a server.
Cross-save
Multi-platform games may share the player's current state via a server.
Crowd control
A technique used primarily in massively multiplayer online games to limit or control how many enemies are hostile to the players so they can be picked off more easily..
CRPG
Abbreviation of computer role-playing game. It has the connotation of referring to "classic" games.
Crunch
A controversial but common labor practice in the video game industry where game developers have to work compulsory overtime, often uncompensated, in order to meet deadlines.
CTF
Cut-in
A phase within a character's super move where the game briefly pauses the character's attack and shows their face (or full body) before proceeding to complete the attack. In fighting games, this move can be blocked.
Cutscene

A game segment that exists solely to provide detail and exposition to the story. They are used extensively in MMOs and RPGs in order to progress the plot. Cutscenes are more likely to be generated by the in-game engine while cinematics are pre-recorded.
Cybersport

== D ==
D-pad

A 4-directional rocker button that allows the player to direct game action in eight different directions: up, down, left, right, and their diagonals. Invented by Gunpei Yokoi for the Game & Watch series of handheld consoles, Nintendo used the "directional pad" (or "cross-key" in Japan) for their Nintendo Entertainment System controller and it has been used on nearly every console controller since.
Damage over time (DoT)
An effect, such as poison or catching on fire, that reduces a player's health over the course of time or turns.
Damage per minute (DPM)
Used as a metric in some games to allow the player to determine their offensive power.
Damage per second (DPS)
1. Used as a metric in some games to allow the player to determine their offensive power, particularly in games where the player's attacks are performed automatically when a target is in range.
2. A character archetype in team or party-based games, specifically a character or class that is designed purely to deal as much damage as possible to enemies, as opposed to a tank or healer, who have other primary duties. Specific characters or classes may be considered "sub-types" of DPS, such as a "magic-DPS" as opposed to a "melee-DPS".
Day one

The day of release for a video game; often accompanied by a "day-one patch" to repair issues that could not be addressed in time for the game's distribution, or "day-one DLC", where the developer offers content for a price. "Day-one DLC" is often associated with on-disc DLC, where the content is already a part of the game's data, but the player must pay to access it.
Day zero

Before the day of release for a video game; often accompanied by a "day-zero DLC" to allow early play time that users paid for before launch or extra cosmetics. The purchaser may receive the "day-one DLC" on launch day, or some in game currency, where the developer offers content bundled in for buying the game "pre-launch". The "day-one DLC" is often associated with on-disc DLC, where the content is already a part of the game's data, but the player must pay to access it.
Dead zone
1. A region of the screen in video games in which the camera is controlled via free look where the mouse cursor can be positioned to lock the camera in place. Can be adjusted in some games.
2. A deadzone setting for the analog stick that lets players configure how sensitive they want their analog sticks to be, popular in console FPS games, and in racing games where it appears as Steering Deadzone.
Deathmatch

A game mode in many shooter and real-time strategy games in which the objective is to kill as many other characters as possible until a time limit or kill limit is reached.
Debug mode
A feature left in a game that the development team uses to test the game and check for bugs. This can be implemented in many ways, such as a menu with selectable options, button combinations or a room with stuff useful for testing. Debug modes will tend to have many useful features for testing, such as being able to make the player invulnerable to damage, giving the tester every single weapon available, being able to warp to any part of the game as needed, being able to defeat any enemy in a single hit, and so on. There may also be the ability to modify the camera placement, such as for the purpose of taking screenshots to use for advertising purposes. Typically, these will be removed or hidden before the game is released to the public. Some games may leave them available to the player, such as by making them be an unlockable option or requiring a code to unlock it. In other cases, they may be entirely unavailable through normal gameplay and glitches or external hacking would be required to access them. This can also be referred to as a debug menu or a debug room.
Degrees of freedom
The number of vectors of player-character movement that the player has control over, which are often a criterion associated with the game's genre.
- Side-scrollers typically have 2-DoF: left/right (run along X-axis), and up/down (jump/fall along Y-axis).
- Top-down, isometric graphics-based, and 3D graphics-based games may have 3-DoF or 4-DoF: aim left/right (rotate around Z-axis), move left/right (strafe along X-axis) and move forward/backward (run along Y-axis), and move up/down (jump/fall/crouch along Z-axis).
- 3D flying games may have up to 6-DoF: movement along the X, Y, or Z axes as left/right (along X-axis), forward/backward (along Y-axis), and up/down (along Z-axis), and rotation around X, Y, or Z axes as pitch (around X-axis), roll (around Y-axis), and yaw (around Z-axis)
In addition, special features of games may manipulate other dimensions not associated with the X, Y, and Z axes of 3D space as DoF, such as time, player state, macro-location (fast travel), map state, NPC visibility or other game parameters.
Debuff
1. The opposite of a buff, an effect placed on a character that negatively impacts their statistics and characteristics.
2. Effects that nullify or cancel the effects of buffs.
Demake
A type of video game remake for (or emulating the style of) older generation hardware.
Destructible environment
A game level in which walls and other surfaces can be damaged and destroyed.
Developer
The production company which makes a video game.
Development hell
An unofficial, indefinite "waiting period" during which a project is effectively stalled and unable to proceed. Projects that enter development hell are often delayed by several years, but are not usually considered to be formally cancelled by the publisher.
Devolution
The act of running games and applications from storage media not originally supported for this use. For example, external hard disk drives or USB flash drives can be used on consoles that only officially support running games and applications from CD or DVD disks. Usually can only be done in modded game consoles.
Dialog tree

Found primarily in adventure games, a means of providing a menu of dialog choices to the player when interacting with a non-player character so as to learn more from that character, influence the character's actions, and otherwise progress the game's story. The tree nature comes from typically having multiple branching levels of questions and replies that can be explored.
Dialog wheel
Like the dialog tree, it presents various dialog choices to players. However, the choices imply an emotional tone rather than showing the exact dialog that will be spoken.
Difficulty
The level of difficulty that a player wishes to face while playing a game. At higher difficulty levels, the player usually faces stronger NPCs, limited resources, or tighter time-limits.
Digital rights management (DRM)
Software tools for copyright protection. Often criticized, particularly if the DRM tool is overly restrictive or badly designed.
Directional pad
Display mode
DLC
Dolphin
In free-to-play games, a user who occasionally spends real-world money on in-game items or spends a modest amount, but not enough to be considered a whale.
Doom clone
An early term for first-person shooters, based on gameplay and level design which mimicked concepts from Doom.
Double jump
A game character being able to execute two successive jumps, the second jump occurring in mid-air without coming into contact with anything, when game mechanics allow for it. The player must then typically touch the ground before being able to jump again.
Down-but-not-out (DBNO)

A term for near-death state, typically found in team battle royale games, in which a player becomes incapacitated instead of dying after losing health points. Players in this state can be revived by teammates as long as they still have health, and in certain games such as Tom Clancy's Rainbow Six Siege, players can self-revive, or "self-rez".
Downloadable content (DLC)
Additional content for a video game that is acquired through a digital delivery system.
DPM
DPS
Draft
A game mode associated with collectible card games including digital variants. A draft mode enables a player to create a deck of cards in such games by selecting one card of a number of randomly selected cards at a time. The player then uses the completed deck to play in matches against other players or computer opponents until they meet a certain win or loss record. Draft games contrast with constructed deck games, where players draw on their personal collections of cards.
Dragon kill points (DKP)
A semi-formal score-keeping system used by guilds in massively multiplayer online games that is redeemed after killing bosses or completing other challenges.
Drift

A typical malfunction that affects the analog stick(s) of a gamepad, in which its neutral position is set somewhere on its fringe, instead of the central position that it default maintains when the analog stick is unmoved. This can cause undesired gameplay effects, such as causing a character to constantly move or the game camera to constantly be locked to one skewed angle while the analog stick(s) is/are unmoved, depending on which stick is affected or the game's controls.
DRM
Drop rate
The probability of obtaining a particular item from a loot box or booster pack in certain video games, particularly in games with microtransactions.
Drop-in, drop-out
A type of competitive or cooperative multiplayer game that enables a player to join the game at any time without waiting and leave without any penalty, and without affecting the game for other players.
Dummied out
Refers to content that existed in a game during development and is in the code, but is not actually present in typical gameplay. Lots of aspects in a game can be this, such as cutscenes, weapons, characters (playable or not), items, missions or levels. There are many reasons why content may be subject to this, like if it was too buggy, if it was too unbalanced, if it was never intended to be released (like a weapon that is overpowered on purpose so the developers can get through the story easily), copyright issues (such as if a license to use a copyrighted character expired), if programming it could not be finished in time (such as to meet a release date), or any other reason.
Dungeon

In an open world game such as an RPG, an enclosed area filled with complex puzzles to solve and hostile NPCs where the player is likely to come under attack. In this sense, it can be used to refer to literal "dungeons" or include any number of other places, such as caves, ships, forests, sewers or buildings. Dungeons may be maze-like or contain puzzles that the player must solve and often hide valuable items within to encourage player exploration.
Dungeon crawl
A genre of video game based on exploring dungeons or similar setting, defeating monsters and collecting loot.
Duping
Derived from the word "duplicating", the practice of using a bug to illegitimately create duplicates of unique items or currency in a persistent online game, such as an MMO. Duping can vastly destabilize a virtual economy or even the gameplay itself.
Dynamic game difficulty balancing
The automatic change in parameters, scenarios, and behaviors in a video game in real-time, based on the player's ability, with the aim of avoiding player boredom or frustration.
Dynamic music

== E ==
Early access

A development model where players are able to purchase and play a game as it currently stands, be it early in development or close to a full release. On the developer's end, early access allows them to gather player feedback and further the game's development with the money made from these sales.
Elo hell
The phenomenon of being stuck at a lower rank than is reflective of the player's true skill level in competitive video games that utilize the Elo rating system which may occur for various reasons, usually due to unbalanced matchmaking (where the player may happen to have teammates of inferior skill). Quite often, Elo hell is used as a scapegoat when gamers do not want to admit their flaws, or cannot find them. The term is frequently used in games like Counter-Strike 2, where low-ranking players with high mechanical skill claim that they "ought to be Global Elite" (the highest rank in the game), but fail to prepare for fights, manage their in-game money, or communicate strategies to their teammates.
Emergent gameplay
Gameplay that develops as a result of player creativity, rather than the game's programmed structure. EVE Online is well-known for its emergent gameplay, which allows player-formed alliances to fight extended "wars" over valuable territory and resources, or simply become "space pirates" and prey on other player-operated vessels.
Emulator
A software program that is designed to replicate the software and hardware of a video game console on more modern computers and other devices. Emulators typically include the ability to load software images of cartridges and other similar hardware-based game distribution methods from the earlier hardware generations, in addition to more-traditional software images.
End game
The gameplay of a given title at the climax of its storyline or campaign, and is followed by the postgame.
End game loop
The gameplay available in a massively multiplayer online game for characters that have completed all of the currently-available content. Repeatable content after the climax of the storyline or campaign.
Endless mode
A game mode in which players are challenged to last as long as possible against a continuing threat with limited resources or player-character lives, with their performance ranked on how long they survive before succumbing to the threat (such as the death of the player-character) or on score. This mode is typically offered in games that otherwise have normal endings that can be reached, providing an additional challenge to the players once the main game is completed.
Endless runner

A subgenre of platform game in which the player character runs for an infinite amount of time while avoiding obstacles. The player's objective is to reach a high score by surviving for as long as possible.
Enemy
A non-player character that tries to harm the player.
Energy
1. A game mechanic using a character resource-pool which governs how often the character is allowed to use a special ability.
2. How often a player is allowed to play a particular free-to-play game; energy can be replenished instantly with an in-app purchase, or replenished slowly by waiting and not playing the game.
3. (Usually in futuristic games) The player's health.
Engine
Environmental storytelling
Story that is conveyed via the physical design or set dressing of a game's world, rather than cutscenes or dialogue.
ESP cheats (extra-sensory perception cheats)
A package of multiple cheats. e.g., "distance ESP" shows the distance between the enemy and the player, "player ESP" makes enemies highly visible, and "weapon ESP" shows enemy weapons.
Esports

Organized competitions around competitive video games, often played for prize money and recognition.
Eurojank
An ambitious and creative video game developed in Central and Eastern Europe that is compromised by a small budget and amusing software bugs.
Experience point (XP, EXP)
In games that feature the ability for the player-character to gain levels, such as role-playing video games, experience points are used to denote progress towards the next character level.
Expansion pack (Add-on)
An addition to an existing role-playing game, tabletop game, video game or collectible card game. These add-ons usually add new game areas, weapons, objects, characters, or an extended storyline to an already-released game.
Extraction shooter
A variant of PvP game that involves dropping players, either solo or in teams, onto a map with the goal of gathering resources and reaching an extraction point, often within a set time limit. It often includes elements from survival games, and may include encounters with NPCs in addition to confrontations with opposing players or teams.

== F ==
F
Shorthand for an expression of sympathy when an unfortunate event occurs. The term originates from an internet meme based on a quicktime event from Call of Duty: Advanced Warfare. The expression is often used in a sarcastic or mocking manner.
Face button
A usually circular button on the right side of a traditional gamepad that is pressed very frequently in normal gameplay. Modern gamepads usually have four arranged in a diamond formation.
Fangame
A video game made by fans, based on one or more established video games. Retrogamers may clone early video games to take advantage of more advanced hardware and game engines.
Farming
Repeating a battle, quest, or other part of a game in order to receive more or duplicates of specific reward items that can be gained through that battle or quest, such as experience points, game money, or specific reward items. Gold farming is a type of farming done for in-game currency. See grinding.
Fast travel
Common in role-playing games, a means by which to have the player-character(s) teleport between already-discovered portions of the game's world without having to actually interactively move that distance.
Fear of missing out (FOMO)
A term used around ongoing games with rotating content, the "fear of missing out" is an expression related to the psychological and social anxiety effect for players concerned about missing the opportunity to obtain limited-time characters, items or events while they are available and thus devote more time and resources into the game as to obtain those items. This can include additional expenditures for microtransactions for free-to-play or freemium games.
Feed
In MOBAs, to consistently die to an enemy team or player (either intentionally or due to inexperience), providing them with experience, gold, map pressure, or other advantages.
Field of view (FOV)

A measurement reflecting how much of the game world is visible in a first-person perspective on the display screen, typically represented as an angle. May also refer to the general amount of the game world that is visible on the screen, typically in games where being able to see a lot at once is important, such as strategy games and platformers.
Final boss
First-party developer
A developer that is either owned directly by a console maker or has special arrangements with the console maker; such developers have greater access to internal details about a console compared to traditional developers. A developer that is not owned by a console maker but have special arrangements with them may be referred to as a second-party developer, instead. Games developed by a first-party developer are often referred to as "first-party games".
First-person
A graphical perspective rendered from the viewpoint of the player-character.
First-person shooter (FPS)
A genre of video game where the player experiences the game from the first-person perspective, where the primary mechanic is the use of guns and other ranged weapons to defeat enemies.
Flashing invulnerability

An invincibility or immunity to damage that occurs after the player takes damage for a short time, indicated by the player-character blinking or buffering.
Flip-screen
A game environment divided into single-screen portions, similar to individual tiles in a maze. Players see only one such screen at a time, and they transfer between screens by moving the player-character to the current screen's edge. The picture then abruptly "flips" to the next screen, hence the technique's name. UK magazines also refer to this as flick-screen.
Fog of war

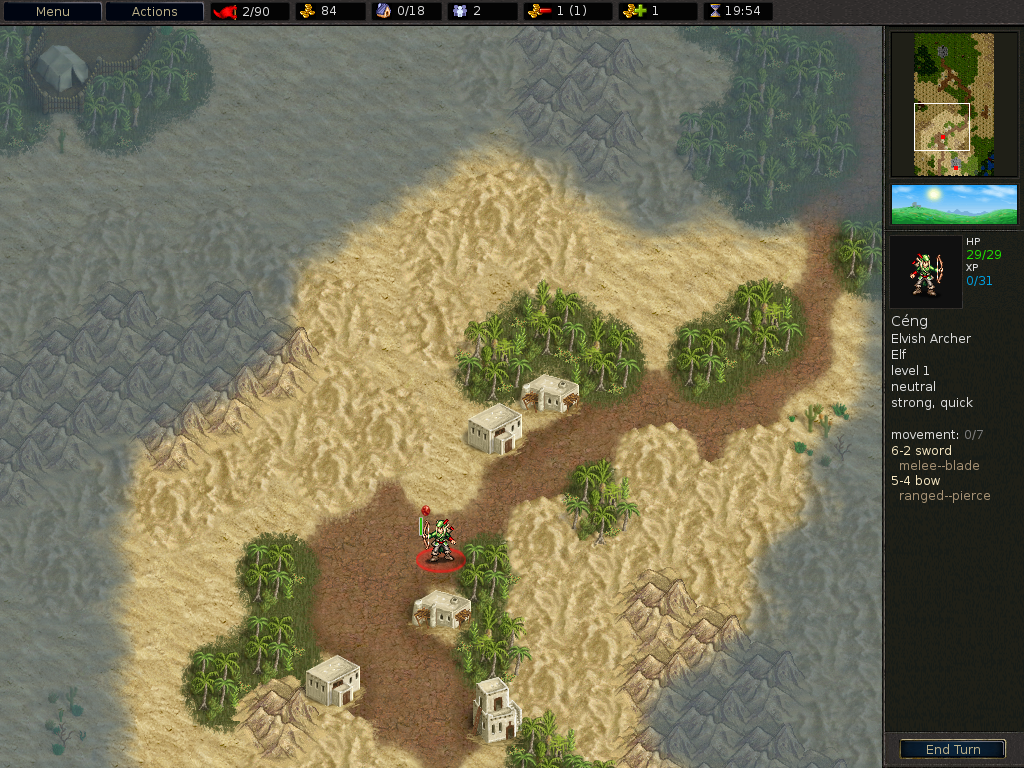
The player cannot see enemy activity beneath the greyed-out fog of war.

Common in strategy games, a 'fog' covers unobservable areas of the map and hides any enemy units in that area.
Footsies
A term used in fighting games to describe players using their basic back and forth movement in order to position themselves to avoid attacks or setup combos.
Foozle
A cliché final boss that exists only to act as the final problem before players can complete the game.
FotM
Acronym for "flavor of the month", referring to a new meta that emerges after an update making certain classes or builds more desirable, that will only last a short amount of time. The phrase originated in the World of Warcraft community, but is also used in MOBAs.
FOV
FPS
1. An abbreviation for first-person shooter.
2. An abbreviation for frames per second.
Frag
To kill or achieve a kill in a game against a player or non-player opponent.
Fragger
In many multiplayer shooters, the player who is focused on killing opponents.
Frame advantage
In fighting games, the difference (in frames) between how quickly the characters can perform another action after attacking or defending.
Frame rate
A measure of the rendering speed of a video game's graphics, typically in frames per second (FPS).
Frame-perfect
An action that must be performed within a single frame for perfect execution.
Free look
1. To be able to look around the map freely, usually limited by typical mechanics of the game such as the boundaries of the game world. This is usually an ability that is disabled to common users, but left in the game coding as a developer's tool and is unlockable if the proper code is known. May also be allowed by a non-player in a multiplayer game to allow seeing every player's progress, especially in e-sports. Typically eliminates fog of war in relevant games.
2. Also called mouselook, a method of control where the player uses the computer mouse to indicate the direction they desire the player-character to look.
Freemium
A pricing strategy by which a product or service (typically a digital offering or an application such as software, media, games or web services) is provided free of charge, but money (premium) is charged for additional features, services, or virtual (online) or physical (offline) goods.
Free-to-play (F2P or FtP)
Games that do not require purchase from a retailer, either physical or digital, to play. Highly prevalent on smartphones, free-to-play games may also provide additional gameplay-enhancing purchases via an in-app purchase. Games that require in-app purchases in order to remain competitive, or gamers who engage in said purchases, are known as pay to win (P2W). Compared to the P2W players, F2P players are often looked down upon. (Compare "freemium", a free-to-play game that follows such a model.)
Friendslop
An ironic term for cooperative multiplayer games, especially those following in the wake of Lethal Company, typically with minimal gameplay structure that can lead to chaotic and humorous interactions between the players and the game that often can go viral on social media sites. Coined after the rise of the term AI slop which inspired a social media meme where the "-slop" suffix is combined with a common game element, overly reducing a genre for comedic effect. Another example is "rollslop", as a moniker for Soulslikes. "Friendslop" has seen some use as a genuine term, in the absence of a genre descriptor for Lethal Company-inspired games.
Full combo (FC)

A term used most commonly in rhythm games, when the player hits every note in a song with no mistakes, therefore never breaking a combo. Often results in the highest possible score on said song.
Fumblecore
A genre of video games where gameplay is designed around intentionally difficult means to control the in-game characters, such as by having to individually control the character's limbs to move around. Such games include QWOP and Octodad: Dadliest Catch.

== G ==
GaaS
Gacha game
A genre of video game that implements the gacha (toy vending machine) mechanic. Similar to loot boxes, gacha games induce players to spend in-game or real-world currency to receive random in-game items or characters. The gacha mechanic is considered integral to the gameplay or player progression of gacha games, whereas loot boxes would not change the gameplay of the games they are attached to in a significant way if they were removed or replaced with a different reward system.
Gambling
Playing games of chance for real money or in-game currency. In video games, loot boxes are commonly associated with gambling.
Game design
The use of design and aesthetics to create a game.
Game engine
The codebase on which a game runs. There are different subsets of engines, such as specialized ones for physics and graphics. Often the game engine is only middleware which game specific behaviours are built upon, though end-users do not tend to make this distinction.
Game jam
An event where participants try to develop a game from scratch in a very short amount of time, often with a theme determined by the organiser of the jam.
Game launcher
An application program for personal computers use to launch one or more games, rather than launching the game directly. Launchers typically include additional services from the software developer to provide middleware such as friends and matchmaking services, content updating, digital-rights management, and cloud saving. A game launcher may also provide features of a digital storefront to purchase and download games. Launchers include those designed by publishers specifically for their games, such as Battle.net or Ubisoft Connect, or may be a general platform to support first- and third-party games like Steam and the Epic Games Store.
Game localization
Game mechanics

An overarching term that describes how a particular game functions and what is possible within the game's environment; the rules of the game. Typical game mechanics include points, turns or lives. An unanticipated and novel use of game mechanics may lead to emergent gameplay.
Game mode

A distinct configuration that varies game mechanics and affects gameplay, such as a single-player mode vs a multiplayer mode, campaign mode, endless mode, or god mode.
Game over
1. The end of the game.
2. The losing screen shown when a loss condition is met.
Game port
When a game is ported from one platform to another. Cross-platform ports are often criticized for their quality, particularly if platform-specific design elements (such as input methods) are not updated for the target platform.
Games as a product

A type of business model where games are bought and sold once as a finished product that receives few to no further content updates, as opposed to games as a service where games receive content updates in the long-term on a continuing revenue model.
Games as a service (GaaS)

A type of business model where games receive content updates in the long-term on a continuing revenue model, as opposed to games as a product, where a game is bought and sold once as a finished product that receives few to no further content updates.
Game save
Game sense
Situational and environmental awareness in a game, and the decision-making based on this awareness.
Game studies
A field of social sciences that attempts to quantify or predict human behavior in various game-based scenarios, often where there is a reward or risk in taking certain actions.
Game world
The location in which a game's action takes place. May refer specifically to the game's environmental components, i.e., its constituent rooms, levels, worlds, and overworld, or more broadly also encompass the game's mechanics and setting.
Gameplay
A player's interaction with a video game, defined through game rules, player-game interface, challenges, plot, and the player's connection with the game.
Gamer rage
Gamethrowing
Gank
To use the element of surprise to flank and attack an enemy. More common in multiplayer games, where "ganking" usually indicates an unwelcome attack on an unwilling or unsuspecting participant.
Gating
Part of a game's design that regulates how new gameplay elements, levels, weapons, abilities, or the like are introduced to the player.
Gear fear
Generally associated with extraction shooters, "gear fear" refers to a player's anxiety in selecting better gear they have earned in a game into a combat situation where that gear can be lost if the player loses the combat. This is a core mechanic and risk of most extract shooters, that one keeps only the gear that they extract safely with, but better gear is needed to be able to defeat other players or high-value targets for the opportunity for further gear improvement.
GG
Abbreviation meaning "good game". Typically exchanged as parting words at the end of a competitive game or match as a gesture of good sportsmanship. The variations "GGWP" ("good game, well played") and "GF" ("good fight") are also occasionally used. Due to the near exclusive use of "GG" at the end of a game or match, it is sometimes said by spectators to denote a situation, action, or move which suggests that a particular player's or team's victory appears inevitable (e.g. "This attack just wiped all the blue player's forces, that's a GG"). It can also be used to taunt players while a game is still in progress as an implication that their win is assured. Insulting variations, such as "GGEZ" ("good game, easy") can similarly be used to imply the opposing player is unskilled.
Ghost
A feature included in time attack or time trial modes in video games allowing the player to review their previous rounds. In racing games, for example, a "ghost car" may follow the last or fastest path a player took around the track. In fighting games, the ghost is an opponent that the computer AI player can train against outside of normal player versus player or story mode. Ghost cars in racing games generally appear as translucent or flashing versions of the player's vehicle. Based on previously recorded lap times, they serve only to represent the fastest lap time and do not interact dynamically with other competitors. A skilled player will use the ghost to improve their time, matching the ghost's racing line as it travels the course. Many racing games, including Gran Turismo, F-Zero, and Mario Kart offer a ghost function. Some also have ghosts set by staff members and developers, often showing perfect routes and lap times. The concept has also been adapted for television broadcasts of auto racing; in 2019, NASCAR broadcasters began to use a ghost graphic during qualifying sessions with a single-car format, intended to visualize the pace of the leader in comparison to the current driver. A variation of the feature, dubbed by Firemonkeys Studios as "Time-Shifted Multiplayer", was implemented in the mobile racing game Real Racing 3. It works by recording the lap times of players in each race, and uses statistics from other players to recreate their lap times for the player to beat. These ghost cars can collide with the player and other vehicles, and are fully visible to the player. In some rhythm games, such as the Elite Beat Agents and Moero! Nekketsu Rhythm Damashii Osu! Tatakae! Ouendan 2, saved replay data can be used in one of the player slots in a multiplayer game.

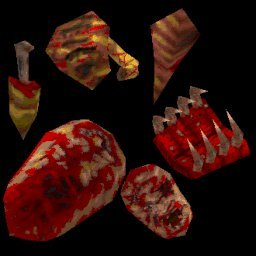
Gibs in OpenQuartz

Gibs
Or "giblets", gore and body chunks which fly from a game opponent when hit with such force that they rupture.
Gimp
1. A character, character class, or character ability that is so underpowered as to make using the gimp a severe handicap in the context of the game.
2. A design choice that has this effect.
3. In multiplayer games, killing a character much earlier than would be expected, such as by relentlessly pursuing them until they die in the early game.
4. In platform fighters, killing a recovering opponent by intercepting their recovery.
Git gud
Slang rendering of "get good", often used to dismiss complaints about difficulty, especially within the soulslike genre, by implying the addressee has not yet learned the game's mechanics. While it can be used in a positive and encouraging manner, it has been accused of fostering patronization or hostility towards non-gamers when used to insult struggling players.
Glass cannon
A character with abilities or equipment aimed at maximizing its damage output to the detriment of its damage mitigation. Common in MMORPGs.
GLHF
Abbreviation meaning "good luck, have fun". Used as words exchanged at the beginning of a competitive game or match as a gesture of good sportsmanship.
GOAT

Acronym for Greatest Of All Time.
GOTY
Acronym for Game Of The Year, a game award given out annually by events and media publications to the games that they consider the best of that particular year. Game of the Year-awards are often divided in subcategories and an overall winner.
God mode

A cheat that makes player-characters invulnerable. Occasionally adds invincibility, where the player can hurt enemies by touching them (e.g., the Super Mario Super Star). The effect may be temporary.
God roll
In games that generate randomized loot, the "god roll" is loot that has the subjectively best selection of possible random attributes such as perks and bonuses that could be generated for that particular piece of equipment.
Gold farming
Gold sink
In-game activities that receive currency (gold) from players; in online multiplayer games, this functionally reduces the overall money supply
Gone gold
The point in the software-development cycle where the software is considered final and ready to be shipped. The term traditionally related to the production of games on CD-ROM, where the final version of the game, the master copy, would be written to a gold film-based writable CD and sent to be replicated for retail.
Graphic content filter
A setting that controls whether the game displays graphic violence.
Grappler
A fighting game character who primarily uses grabbing and throwing attacks.
Griefer
A player in a multiplayer video game who deliberately irritates and harasses other players within the game, such as camping spawn points. Griefers typically use actions permitted in-game; griefers who do not use intended or permitted actions are usually cheating or hacking. Many online multiplayer games enforce rules that forbid griefing.
Grinding
Performing a repetitive and time-consuming action in a video game before being able to advance. Prevalent in online games, where it is alternately considered an annoying waste of time or an enjoyable necessity, depending on the player's attitude. Many online games have taken steps to reduce the "grind", including doing away with traditional "leveling" systems or allowing the player to temporarily "boost" themselves to match the difficulty of NPCs in a given area.
Guild

== H ==
Hack vs Hack
Hack vs Hack (HvH) refers to using cheats to compete against other players using cheats.
Handheld console
A portable gaming console; i.e. one that is not connected to a TV or other peripheral device. Nintendo's Game Boy is the most recognizable example.
Hate
A mechanism by which non-player characters prioritize which player(s) to attack. A mechanism used in many MMORPGs, as well as in some RPGs, by which mobs prioritize which characters to attack. The act of initiating such situation is called "getting aggro" or "pulling aggro." A type of character called a tank deliberately pulls aggro towards themself, and away from other player characters. The tank has a high amount of defense and health to survive constant attacks of mobs.
HDR
is the rendering of computer graphics scenes by using lighting calculations performed in high dynamic range (HDR). This allows preservation of details that may be lost due to limiting contrast ratios.
Head bob
In first-person view games, the up-and-down (and sometimes left-and-right) motion of the player's camera to simulate the bobbing of the player-character's head when walking or running. It is often an option that can be disabled as it may induce motion sickness in players.
Headshot
An attack that strikes the head of its target, causing extra (often fatal) damage.
Head swap
An animation technique in which a new head is put on an existing character model, to save memory or animation effort.
Heal over time (HoT)
An effect that restores health over a period of time; antonym of DoT.
Health

An attribute showing how much damage a character can sustain before being incapacitated. Getting hurt lowers this meter and if it reaches zero that character can no longer continue. Depending on the game this can mean many different things (i.e. death, serious injury, knockout, or exhaustion).
Heat map
In video games, an overhead representation of a game level showing, through background game data collection, a statistic such as where player characters died or which route players took the most. Brighter spots or highly concentrated areas show where these events occurred the most. Such maps may be used by developers to help refine map design.
Hero
Denotes a character that is unique either in an entire game session or within the context of its faction. A hero may have unique special abilities.
Hero ban
In multi-player game genres that feature unique hero characters, like MOBAs and hero shooters, a mechanism that bans the selection of certain heroes. This may be set by the game developer on a schedule, or a per-game voting mechanism by players.
Hidden object game
A subgenre of puzzle video games in which the player must find items from a list that are hidden within a scene.
High score

The highest logged score in a video game.
Hit marker

A visual effect that occurs every time the player-character lands a hit on the opponent; commonly seen in first-person shooter games like Call of Duty.
Hit points (HP)
Hitbox
1. The area or areas that can inflict damage or other effects to a character (usually not the one which created the hitbox).
2.
Hitscan
Commonly seen in first-person shooters, hitscan is used to determine hits along a path with no travel time. Some games use this technique to detect hits with firearms in contrast to physics-based projectiles which have noticeable travel time.
Hitstun
In fighting games, a short period of time during which one character is unable to move after being hit by another character's attack.
HOPA
Acronym for hidden object puzzle adventure.
Horde mode
Hub

An area in a video game from which individual levels are accessed.
Hurtbox
The area describing precisely where the game will register any hits on a game target. The term hitbox is sometimes used as another term for this when the distinction between hitbox and hurtbox is unimportant.

== I ==
Idle animation
An animation that occurs when the player character is not performing any actions.
Idle game
A type of game where player progression happens without the player's input, and often even while the game is closed.
Iframes

In-app purchase (IAP)
A microtransaction in a mobile game (or regular app), usually for virtual goods in free or cheap games.
In-game leader (IGL)
In many multiplayer shooters, the player that coordinates the team and makes decisions. The role is especially useful in games that don't allow live coaching. The in-game leader often discusses strategies with the coach ahead of matches, and typically gets fewer kills than their team mates.
Indie game

Loosely defined as a game made by a single person or a small studio without any financial, development, marketing, or distribution support from a large publisher, though there are exceptions.
Infinite health
Infinite life
Infinite runner
Item level
A number attached to a game item – e.g.: weapon, armor, or clothing – which roughly indicates the item's power, commonly seen in MMORPGs. A character who does not meet the required level of the item would be unable to equip it.
Instance
Interface

Graphic elements that communicate information to the player and aid interaction with the game, such as health bars, ammo meters, and maps.
Inting
Intentionally feeding.
Inventory
A menu or area of the screen where items collected by the player-character during the game can be selected. This interface allows the player to retrieve single-use items for an instant effect or to equip the player-character with the item.
Inventory management
Preparations a player makes with their character's inventory, such as storing or retrieving items, repairing weapons, etc. Failure to manage an inventory properly may result in losing rare items or being less powerful in combat. Common in hardcore games with limited resources like RPGs and survival horror, while uncommon in more casual titles, which may have an infinite inventory or manage it automatically.
Invincibility
Invincibility frames
A brief period of time where a player cannot take damage from attacks. Invincibility frames are most commonly triggered by a player action (such as dodging or rolling), by taking damage or as a short period of safety after respawning..
Invisible wall
An obstruction in a video game that halts movement in a specific direction, even though terrain and features can be seen beyond the boundary.
Invulnerability
Item
An object in the game that a character can collect/pick up/take.

== J ==
Job system
A mechanic most often seen in JRPG games that allows characters to change character class, typically at any time outside of battle, and more rarely during battle, in order to permanently learn the skills of that class through a separate system of experience points. Also called a "class system".
Joke character
A character included in a game for humorous reasons, such as having weak stats or an atypical appearance or personality. They may also function as an additional challenge or handicap for skilled players.
Johning
The action of making excuses for losing (e.g. poor connection or joystick drift). Other variants include pre-johning.
Joystick
An input device consisting of a stick that pivots on a base and reports its angle or direction to the device it is controlling. Modern gaming joysticks have several buttons and may include a thumb-operated analog stick on top.
JRPG
Japanese role-playing video game, typically referring to a subgenre of RPGs that originate from Japan.
Juggernaut
Refers to a game mode where many players face one overpowered enemy (called the Juggernaut) and try to defeat it. The player who kills it often becomes the next Juggernaut.

== K ==
Kick
In online games, the ability of the server or the host of a game to remove a player from the server, thereby "kicking" them out of the game. This can be to prevent undesirable player behavior such as griefing (where it is usually a precursory measure to banning); to reduce issues like lag, where one player's lag problems may affect other players' enjoyment of the game; or to prevent server crashes when communication errors occur between the server and client.
Kill–death ratio

A statistic typically found in player-versus-player video games, gauging the ratio between the number of opponents the player defeated and the number of deaths the player suffered at the hands of opponents. More skilled players typically have higher kill–death ratios.
KDA
Abbreviation of "Kills/Deaths/Assists", a ratio used by MOBA players to evaluate their in-game performance. Used in a similar manner to the kill–death ratio.
Kill farming
When players are stationed near their opponent's spawn point and kill them the moment they respawn.
Kill feed
In multiplayer games, a portion of the game's user interface that shows the last few events (generally, when other players are killed) from the last few seconds, like a news feed.
Kill screen

Level 256 in Pac-Man is a kill screen, unbeatable due to a bug associated with an integer overflow in the game's code.

A stage or level in a video game (often an arcade game) that stops the player's progress due to a software bug. Not to be mistaken for a game over screen, kill screens can result in unpredictable gameplay and bizarre glitches.
Kill stealing
Defeating an enemy that someone else was about to defeat, usually to receive the reward or credit without doing most of the work. Considered 'bad form' in many online communities.
King of the hill (KOTH)
A game mode where opposing teams try to occupy a single point on the map for a certain amount of time, or for as long as possible until the end of the match.
Kit
The set of skills and abilities given to a pre-defined playable character in games featuring many such characters to choose from, such as many MOBAs or hero shooters.
Kiting
A maneuver in which a player-character gets an enemy NPC to chase after them so as to lead them somewhere else (like a kite on a string). This can be used to separate groups of enemies to prevent the player from becoming overwhelmed or in team-based or cooperative games to allow the player's teammates to attack the opponent, or to lure the opponent into a trap.
Knock-back
A game mechanic in many types of games where a character is thrown backwards from the force of an attack. During knock-back, the character is unable to change their direction until a short recovery animation is finished. Knock-back sometimes results in falling down pits if the character is standing close to the edge when hit with a knock-back attack.
Konami Code

The Konami Code

A fixed series of controller button presses used across numerous Konami games to unlock special cheats (such as gaining a large number of lives in Contra), and subsequently used by other developers to enable cheats or added functions in these games. The term applies to variations on this sequence but nearly all begin with "up up down down left right left right".

== L ==
Lag
In video games, an unintentional or unexpected delay between the start and end of a process, usually to a detrimental effect on gameplay. Lag can occur in any of the many different processes in a video game, to vastly differing effects depending on the source:
- Frame lag: A direct delay in the rate at which a frame is processed. This is usually the result of having too many objects active at once – the physics, rendering and other processes of which must each be calculated on every frame. In turn, this results in choppy movement, and depending on how the code is handled, either slowed gameplay compared to real-time (when the lag is not accounted for) or a loss of player control precision (when it is accounted for). In multiplayer games, this is often called client-side lag, as opposed to server-side lag.
- Rendering lag: A delay in the rate at which an otherwise-processed frame is rendered, usually due to a very large number of polygons or visual effects on screen at once. This can have similar visual effects as frame lag, but can alternatively result in frames being rendered incompletely – missing visual details, textures, particle effects or occasionally entire objects. Occasionally, a similar effect can be seen with layered audio cues.
- Server-side lag: A delay appearing only in online multiplayer games, between the client (the player's device) or the server sending information across the internet, and the counterpart receiving said information. This rarely looks like frame lag or rendering lag, and can instead cause a variety of effects such as dropped player inputs, desynchronisation between the player and server's versions of events, rubber-banding (where entities appear to "snap" between different positions), or in worst-case scenarios, the player being removed from the server entirely, or kicked.
Laner
A player role in MOBA games that focuses on one of the typically three lanes on the map.
LAN party
A gathering of people who play multiplayer games together over a local network, often bringing their own computers or game systems with them. LAN is an acronym for local area network.
Last hitting
The action of getting the killing blow on an NPC, receiving gold and experience points that would have been reduced or awarded to someone else. MOBA games, such as League of Legends and Dota 2 use this term and most other games use "".
Last man standing
A multiplayer deathmatch mode in which the objective is not to achieve the most kills but to survive the longest, or alternatively to have the fewest character deaths in a given period of time.
Launch title
A game released simultaneously with its respective platform, or during its near-term launch window.
Leaderboard
A list or table logging the highest scores achieved in a particular game.
Let's Play (LP)
A type of video game walkthrough done by players, through screenshots or video, where the player provides commentary about the game as they work through it.
Level
1. A location in a game. Also area, map, stage, dungeon. Several levels may be grouped into a world. Some games include special bonus stages or secret levels.
2. A character's experience level in a role-playing game, which increases through playing the game to train a character's abilities. It serves as a rough indicator of that character's overall proficiency.
3. A round or wave in a single-location game with increasing difficulty.
Level design
A sub-discipline of game design with a focus on levels (in this case referring to the design of in-game areas).
Level editor
A program, either provided within the game software or as separate software product, that allows players to place objects or create new levels for a video game.
Level scaling
A game mechanic in games where the player advances in level, which alters the attributes of a player character or opponents so that there is a similar challenge in combat. If the player character is several levels higher, either the enemy would be buffed or the player's abilities nerfed so that the challenge would be similar. The player would still gain added benefits with higher levels, such as additional abilities, better equipment with unique properties, and access to higher-level quests or areas. Examples of games with level scaling include World of Warcraft and Destiny.
LFG
Abbreviation of "Looking For Group". Used by players looking to team up with others, the acronym is usually accompanied by a set of criteria or a player's specs.
LFM
Abbreviation of "Looking For More". Used by players who have an incomplete team and are looking for players to fill the remaining spots, the acronym is usually accompanied by a set of criteria (such as a level or class requirement).
Life
One of multiple chances that a player has to retry a task after failing. Losing all of one's lives is usually a loss condition and may force the player to start over. It is common in action games for the player-character to have multiple lives and chances to earn more during the game. This way, a player can recover from making a disastrous mistake. Role-playing games and adventure games usually give the player only one life, but allow them to reload a saved game if they fail. A life may similarly be defined as the period between the start and end of play for any character, from creation to destruction.
Lifesteal (or "life steal")
The ability of a character in game to steal the HP of an opponent, typically by attacking.
Light gun
A specialized type of game controller that the player points at their television screen or monitor to interact with the game.
Live service games
Loadout
A specific set of in-game equipment, abilities, power-ups, and other items that a player sets for their character prior to the start of a game's match, round, or mission. Games that feature such loadouts typically allow players to store, recall, and adjust two or more loadouts so they can switch between them quickly.
Lobby
An in-game area or menu in which players connect, congregate and/or plan before entering the game proper, for instance before beginning a match or embarking on a raid.
Localization
During publishing, the process of editing a game for audiences in another region or country, primarily by translating the text and dialog of a video game. Localization can also involve changing content of the game to reflect different cultural values and censoring material that is against local law, or in some cases self-censoring in an effort to obtain a more commercially favorable content rating.
LOD
Abbreviation for "level of detail". Refers to a graphical trick where more distant objects are rendered in a lower fidelity (e.g. lower poly, lower resolution textures) than closer objects in order to improve performance. When a change in LOD is noticeable, it is called pop-in.
Longplay
A recorded playthrough of a game from the beginning to the end without any interruptions or commentary, often made as video walkthrough guides in case players get stuck on some parts of the game.
Local co-op
Local multiplayer
A multiplayer game that can be played over a local network, such as LAN or WLAN, without needing to be connected to the wider internet.
Loot box
Loot boxes (and other name variants, such as booster packs for online collectible card games) are awarded to players for completing a match, gaining an experience level, or other in-game achievement. The box contains random items, typically cosmetic-only but may include gameplay-impacting items, often awarded based on a rarity system. In many cases, additional loot boxes can be obtained through microtransactions.
Loot system
Methods used in multiplayer games to distribute treasure among cooperating players for finishing a quest. While early MMOs distributed loot on a "first come, first served" basis, it was quickly discovered that such a system was easily abused, and later games instead used a "need-or-greed" system, in which the participating players roll virtual dice, and the loot is distributed according to the results.
Low%
Finishing or completing the end objectives of the game while having the lowest possible score/using the least number of items.
Low poly
A graphical style defined by a small number of polygons used for each model. In the early days of 3D graphics, this style was used by necessity, as the hardware games ran on could not handle a high polygon count without a significant drop in performance. Nowadays, the style is used by many indie games who use it either to evoke the style of early 3D games or as a way to create a unique style at a low development cost.
LTE
Abbreviation for Limited Time Event. An event that requires players to complete a set of goals within a deadline to obtain a reward. Prizes often range from exclusive characters and skins, to items and currencies. Some games allow for goals to be skipped using premium currency. LTEs are most commonly found in gacha games.

== M ==
Macro
1. The handling of larger scale decisions, primarily in real-time strategy games.
2. A usermade algorithm made-up of series of different actions such as spells or abilities made in order to save the player time and gain an advantage in PvP or just quickly shout certain cliché phrases, especially popular in MMORPGs.
Magic
Any of a variety of game mechanics to render fantastical or otherwise unnatural effects, though accessories (scrolls, potions, artifacts) or a pool of resources inherent to the character (mana, magic points, etc).
Main
To focus on playing a certain character in a game, sometimes exclusively.
Main quest
A chain of quests that compose a game's storyline which must be completed to finish the game. In comparison, side quests offer rewards but don't advance the main quest.
Map
Mana

A pool of resources inherent to a character that determines the amount of magical abilities they are able to use.
Masocore
A portmanteau of masochist and hardcore, referring to a genre of punishingly difficult games, particularly the Dark Souls series and related Soulslikes as well as indie games such as I Wanna Be the Guy and Super Meat Boy. The genre is popular among hardcore gamers. See also Nintendo hard.
Massively multiplayer online game (MMO)
A game that involves a large community of players co-existing in an online world, in cooperation or competition with one another.
Massively multiplayer online role-playing game (MMORPG)
An MMO that incorporates traditional role-playing game mechanics. Games such as EverQuest and Dark Age of Camelot were progenitors of the genre. The most popular and most well-known game of this type is World of Warcraft.
Match-3 game
A popular subgenre of the tile-matching video game genre, where the number of tiles matches a player must make is three. Well-known match-3 games include Bejeweled and Candy Crush Saga.
Matchmaking
A game system that automatically sorts players with similar playing styles, desires, objectives, or skill levels into a team or a group. In competitive games or modes, a matchmaking rating (MMR) is a number assigned to each player based on skill and is the basis for matching players. This rating goes up or down based on individual or team performance.
Maxed out
1. Reaching the maximum level that a character (or in some cases, a weapon or other game item) can have.
2. Raising a character's statistics to the maximum value.
3. In real-time strategy games, recruiting units until the maximum number is reached.
Meta
A common slang term for metagame or dominant strategy. Clipping of metagame..
Metagame
1. In games that encourage repeated playthroughs and match-based multiplayer games, the gameplay elements that are typically not part of the main game but can be invoked by the player to alter future playthroughs of the main game.
2. A dominant strategy or set of strategies, often in the context of a competitive game.
Metastory
The sum total of all known or implied stories of every character in the game, every branching storyline, and all potential outcomes and backstory.
Metroidbrainia
A genre of games, where progress is limited by the player's current comprehension of the game world, rather than in-game ability. Where revisiting previous areas re-contextualizes perceived physical barriers into puzzles and riddles to be solved.
Metroidvania
A genre of exploration-focused games, usually featuring a large, interconnected world. Access to certain areas and defeating certain enemies requires items found elsewhere, necessitating exploration and defeating enemies to obtain them. These games are usually side-scrolling platformers or viewed from the top-down, although they can be found in 3D as well. Many borrow features from Roguelike games, such as permanent death. Named for two pioneers of the genre, the Metroid and Castlevania series.
Micro
The handling of detailed gameplay elements by the player.
Microtransaction
A business model used in games where players can purchase virtual goods via micropayments. Usually disliked by players, especially when the purchasable goods give players an advantage over players who did not purchase the goods.
Minimap
A smaller version of the play area, typically displayed in the corner of a players screen used for navigating the game world. May also display locations of friendly or enemy players..
Min-maxing
1. The practice of playing a role-playing game, wargame or video game with the intent of creating the "best" character by means of minimizing undesired or unimportant traits and maximizing desired ones. This is usually accomplished by improving one specific trait or ability (or a set of traits/abilities) by sacrificing ability in all other fields. This is easier to accomplish in games where attributes are generated from a certain number of points rather than in ones where they are randomly generated.
2. Playing the meta, at possible detriment to the story or enjoyment of the game. Colloquialism.
Miniboss
Minigame
A 'game-within-a-game', often provided as a diversion from the game's plot. Minigames are usually one-screen affairs with limited replay value, though some games have provided an entire commercial release as a 'mini-game' within the primary game-world.
Mission
MMO
MMORPG
MMR
Mob
An in-game enemy that roams a specific area. Abbreviation of "mobile", it was first used in text-based online games in reference to non-player characters.
MOBA
Mod
A third-party addition or alteration to a game. Mods may take the form of new character skins, altered game mechanics or the creation of a new story or an entirely new game-world. Some games (such as Fallout 4 and Skyrim) provide tools to create game mods, while other games that don't officially support game modifications can be altered or extended with the use of third-party tools.
Mode
1. Technical or non-play modes for the hardware or software of a video game, such as a diagnostic or configuration mode, video or sound test, or the attract mode of arcade games.
2. Gameplay modes which affect the game mechanics.
Modpack
A collection of mods devised to work together to achieve an enhanced or redefined gameplay experience. Modpacks can come in varying dedicated categories depending on the game they're based on, with more universal examples being modpacks tailored towards general content addition or performance enhancement.
Monetization
A broad term referring to various methods game developers and publishers have to make money off of their games.
Money hat
A practice in which a console manufacturer pays a third-party developer to make a game a console exclusive.
Motion blur
A post-processing effect that emphasizes movement and speed by adding a blur effect to the game camera.
Motion control
A game system that requires physical movement by the player to control player character actions. Popularized by the Wii, motion control is available on most recent console and handheld systems.
Mount
Any creature or vehicle the player can use to traverse or use in combat. The arcade game Joust was the first to feature mounts, specifically of an ostrich and a stork.
Mouselook
Moveset
The set of moves or actions that a character can perform
MP
1. Abbreviation of magic points.
2. Abbreviation of multiplayer.
MUD

A multiplayer real-time virtual world, usually text-based.
Mudflation
An online game virtual economy phenomenon in which endgame players become rich in currency and drive down the cost of rare items.
Multi-load games
Games, typically from the 1980s, that would only load one portion of the game into memory at a time. This technique let developers make each in-memory portion of the game more complex.
Multiplatform

A game which can be played on multiple platforms.
Multiplayer
A game that allows multiple players to play at once.
Multiplayer online battle arena (MOBA)
A genre of video game popularized by Defense of the Ancients that pits teams of players to defend their home base from enemy onslaughts.
Multiple character control
A feature of role-playing video games where the player controls multiple characters in real-time. The PlayStation 2 was first with this feature in the Summoner and Dynasty Warriors series.
Multiple endings
When a game's story has multiple final outcomes, as compared to a linear story which typically ends with the defeat of the game's final boss. Players may have to meet certain requirements in order to view each ending.
Multiplier
1. In games with a scoring system, a gameplay element that increases the value of the points earned by the given multiplier value while the multiplier is active. A common feature of most pinball tables.
2. Refers to the specific factor which changes a playable character or enemy's attributes, either inherently or due to a temporary buff or debuff.

== N ==
Nerf
A change, usually a patch, intended to weaken a particular item, tactic, ability, or character, ostensibly for balancing purposes. Contrast with buff.
New Game Plus (NG+)
An option to play through an already-completed game's story again, carrying over characters, attributes, or equipment from a prior playthrough.
Newbie (newb)
Someone new to the game, generally used as a pejorative, although often light-heartedly. Not as pejorative as noob.
Nintendo hard
The extremely high difficulty of a video game. The term recalls the notoriously difficult Nintendo Entertainment System (NES) games from the mid-1980s to the early 1990s.
Noclip mode
A cheat that allows players to pass through normally impenetrable objects – walls, ceilings, and floors – by disabling clipping.
No johns
A term meaning "no excuses", generally used when a player proclaims false or exaggerated reasons for not playing well. Originates from the competitive Super Smash Bros. Melee community.
Non-player character (NPC)

Abbreviation of non-player character or non-playable character, is a computer-controlled character or any character that is not under a player's direct control.
Noob
A pejorative used to insult a player who is making mistakes that an experienced player would be expected to avoid. Sometimes spelled as n00b. See newbie.
No-scope
When a player uses a sniper rifle to achieve a kill without using its scope. Considered skillful, especially at range, as hipfired weapons usually have poor accuracy. Similar to quickscoping.
Note highway
A visual element of most rhythm games that show the notes the player must match as they scroll along the screen. This is more commonly considered a "highway" when the notes scroll down the screen on a perspective-based grid, making it appear as a road highway.
Nt
Meaning "Nice try". Generally said through a chat function in online multiplayer games to boost the morale of players. Can be directed towards both the friendly and enemy teams. Used when teammates or opponents fail after trying something new, or put in large amounts of effort towards the objective to no avail. "Nice try" could also be used in a condescending manner to mock opponents.
Nuke
A spell or skill that is capable of dealing a large amount of damage to its target. Also in the context of video games, "nuking" may also describe the act of using a nuclear weapon while playing the game, such as the atomic bomb in Call of Duty games. In an MMORPG, nuking may differ in meaning between different communities. For example, to some individuals, to "nuke" is to deal the most possible damage to the most enemies possible (almost exclusively by means of an area of effect skill), whereas other individuals use the term by referring to the highest possible damage to a single target in the shortest amount of time, also known as a spike. Some individuals believe that the player, or players, nuking must do so by means of ranged combat (that is, out of melee range); others make no such distinction. It can also mean to critical hit often or just to deal high standard damage. In a real-time or turn-based strategy game, the term "nuke" has one distinct use. It can describe the tactic of attacking an opponent's specific (often high-priority) units with high-damage spells in order to kill them or force (or strongly encourage) the opposing player to remove them from battle. Such usage is common in Warcraft III, in which "Heroes" are frequently the targets and attackers due to their relative high priority and common faculty for high-damaging spells.

== O ==
Oddball
A game mode in the Halo series and a few other first-person shooters, where players on opposing teams attempt to capture and then hold on to a ball for as long as possible, while the opposing team tries to eliminate the player holding the ball in an attempt to get it back.
Old-school gaming
On-disc DLC
Content that is on the physical media (usually a disc) of a game, but cannot be accessed without buying the content separately. Usually day-one DLC is assumed to be this, but not always. This term also includes data which is downloaded with a downloadable game but not accessible without payment. Not used for free-to-play or freemium games.
On rails
A term that refers to gameplay in which the player can only progress in one direction with limited exploration or branching, similar to a dark ride at theme parks. While this is expected in certain genres, like rail shooters, it may be criticized in genres that normally allow for more exploration.
One-shot
1. To eliminate within a very short time frame, usually with only one shot of a weapon or use of an ability.
2. When a character is low on health and one shot away from elimination.
One-trick
When a player continually chooses to play as a specific character in a wide roster and often refuses to switch.
Online game
A game where part of the game engine is on a server and requires an Internet connection. Many multiplayer games support online play.
Open beta
The opposite of a closed beta; the test players are not bound by non-disclosure agreements and are free to show the game to others..
Open world
A game world where the player has much greater freedom in choosing the order that they visit areas within the world, rather than being restricted to a pre-defined or heavily constricted order of visiting areas. While 'open world' and 'sandbox' are sometimes used interchangeably, the terms refer to different concepts and are not synonymous.
OTP
Abbreviation of one-trick pony, often used pejoratively, but can also be used boastfully if the person can consistently carry their team.
Overextend
When a player or group of players are moving or moved far into the map where it could be the enemy's territory where they will be most likely outnumbered and destroyed.
Overpowered (OP)
A character, item, ability or other effect that is too powerful, disrupting game balance. Often a controversial term.
Overwatch
In turn-based tactics games, a character ends their turn and fires upon any enemies who enter their line of sight, providing covering fire for other characters.
Overworld

1. In open world games such as RPGs, an area that serves to connect other areas of the game world.
2. In platform games, levels that are considered above-ground, in contrast to cave-like levels which are referred to as underworlds.

== P ==
Pacifist run
An attempt to reach the ending of a game while defeating as few enemies as possible, often exploiting various bugs and glitches.
Pack-in game
A game that is included with the purchase of a video game console as a form of product bundling..
Paddle
A game controller that primarily included a large dial that could be turned either clockwise or counter-clockwise to generate movement in one dimension within a game.
Palette swap
Video game characters which are graphically similar except for a hue-shifted palette. Typically done to preserve resources or data space that would otherwise be used up by different designs for the same character, especially for games with sprite-based graphics, though other reasons may exist for palette swaps, such as differentiating similar-looking characters with different properties (e.g. the Green and Red Koopa Troopas from the Super Mario series having different behaviors), or accommodating for the presence of more than one instance of the same unique character to avoid confusion or paradoxes, especially in multiplayer games where multiple players pick the same character.
Paper doll
A visual representation of the player character's currently used equipment, in which the items are displayed on top of an image of the character.
Party
1. In a cooperative multiplayer game, a team of players working together to complete the same mission or quest.
2. In a single-player game, a group of characters traveling together on a quest that the player may control or have the most direct access to. The characters themselves are typically referred to as "party members".
Parry
A block in fighting and action video games performed by precisely timing a defensive maneuver or block. Parries usually fully negate damage from the attack, and may reflect the attack or put the opponent at a momentary disadvantage. In return for these potential advantages, parries often present a risk-reward dynamic in which missing the precise timing leaves the user open to more damage than they would have suffered using a normal block.
Party game
A multiplayer game, usually consisting of a series of short minigames, that can be easily played in a social setting.
Patch
The process by which a developer of a video game creates an update to an already released game with the intention of possibly adding new content, fixing any bugs in the current game, balancing character issues (especially prevalent in online multiplayer games with competitive focuses), or updating the game to be compatible with DLC releases..
Pause
The option to temporarily suspend play of a video game, allowing the player to take a break or attend to an urgent matter outside of the game, or to perform other actions through a menu, such as adjusting options, saving the current game or ending the current game session. In multiplayer online or networked games, pausing may not be available as a feature, as such games require continuous activity from all participating players in order to properly function.
Paywall
A monetization method that requires players to spend money to access gameplay features.
Pay to win (P2W)

Elements of a game that can only be unlocked by making premium digital purchases and provide the player with an advantage. The purchase packages can include game currency, resources, special characters, unique items, summoning tickets, character skins that give buffs to their stats, or VIP points if the game has a built-in VIP system. This monetization scheme can result in an unbalanced experience between players. An inverse of the term, pay to lose, refers to digital purchases that grant perceived disadvantages.
Peak
Commonly used when the player or someone in the current lobby they are in does something that is above their current skill level.
Pentakill (penta)

Occurs when a single player gets the killing blow on five opposing players in rapid succession, resulting in a team elimination. Comparable to ace.
Performance
How well a game runs in terms of frame rate. Generally, a game that is considered performant has a frame rate that is both high and consistent in all areas of the game.
Peripheral
An optional hardware component for a video game system.
Perks
Special bonuses that video game players can add to their characters to give special abilities. Similar to power ups, but permanent.
Permadeath

Generally refers to when a player must restart the game from the beginning when their character dies, instead of from a saved game or save point. This may also refer to the case of a player having to restart the game due to failing to meet a certain objective. The term may also apply to squad-based games such as tactical role-playing games, if the death of the character eliminates that character from the game completely but the game may continue on with other characters.
Persistent state world (PSW)
An online game-world that exists independently of the players and is semi-permanently affected by their actions.
Pet class
A term used in online games, primarily MMORPGs, for a class that summons creatures ("pets") to aid them in battle. Also known simply as "Summoners".
Pervasive game
A game that blends its in-game world with the physical world. The term has been associated with ubiquitous games, mixed-reality games, and location-aware mobile games. Examples of pervasive games include Pokémon Go and Pac-Manhattan.
Physical release
A version of a video game released on an optical disc or other storage device, as opposed to a digital download.
Physics game
A subgenre of puzzle video game where the player has to use the game's physics and environment to complete each puzzle. Notable examples include Portal, World of Goo and Cut the Rope, and projectile collision games such as Angry Birds and Peggle.
Ping
1. In online games, the network latency between the client and server. Can also be used like lagging, if there is a high network latency.
2. A means of highlighting a feature on a game's map that is seen on the user interface of allied players (as a part of a ping system).)
Ping system
In co-operative multiplayer games, gameplay feature that allows players on the same team to visibly highlight, or "ping", other features on the map (such as waypoints, enemies, or treasure) to their allied players. While ping systems existed in various genres such as MOBAs before, Apex Legends in the late 2010s was cited with popularizing the system for first-person shooters that enabled effective communication between players without the need for voice chat.
Pity pull
A mechanic in certain gacha games where a player will eventually be guaranteed a high-quality item after too many unsuccessful pulls.
Pixel art
A graphical style where images are constructed primarily with pixels. Typically, this style includes a low pixel count and a restricted color palette so that individual pixels are easily distinguishable. Early video games used pixel art as a limitation of their hardware, but the style is still used in many games, primarily indie games, either as a cost-effective way of creating a unique style or as a way of evoking a retro aesthetic.
Pixel hunting
A game element that involves searching an entire scene for a single (often pixel-sized) point of interactivity. Common in adventure games, most players consider "hunt-the-pixel" puzzles to be a tedious chore, borne of inadequate game design. The text-adventure version of this problem is called "guess-the-verb" or "syntax puzzle".
Pixel-perfect
Used to describe an in-game action that must be performed while being positioned within a pixel-wide gap for perfect execution. A pixel in this case may refer to a screen pixel or an in-game pixel, such as in video games that utilize pixel art.
PK
Short for "player kill" or "player killing", it is an act in an online game where a player kills another player's character. While PvP is a broad term encompassing any game mode where players fight each other, PK often refers to a more specific, and sometimes negative, aspect of PvP, particularly when players target others who are not actively engaged in PvP combat.
Plant
"Plants" are often found in games that feature a variety of microtransactions. They are "players" who collude with game developers to promote unhealthy competition. These "plants" are discretely given free and powerful items by game developers. This is typically done to artificially create competition for the legitimate paying players so that the already paying players feel the need to spend more money to compete against this new "player".
Platform
1. A buzzword for operating system, a video game is released for Windows or Android and so forth, not for PC, console or mobile. A corporation that controls a platform is referred to as a "platform holder".
2. A resting piece of ground, frequently floating, in a platform game (see below).
Platform fighter

A fighting game with an emphasis on platforming mechanics. Usually, a ring out is the only method to defeat opponents.
Platform game

Any video game, or genre which involves heavy use of jumping, climbing, and other acrobatic maneuvers to guide the player-character between suspended platforms and over obstacles in the game environment.
Platting
A term exclusive to PlayStation users that refers to obtaining all achievements of a game. The word "plat" refers to the platinum trophy, which is usually the most difficult achievement to obtain and often the last one to be unlocked. It is sometimes denoted as "platinum" when used as a verb.
Play
When the performance of a player is decisive, skillful, or otherwise noteworthy, the events or actions of the player as a whole are referred to as a "play" (e.g. "Nice play dude").
Player-character (PC)
The character controlled and played by the human player in a video game. Often the game's main protagonist. Tidus from Final Fantasy X and Doomguy from the Doom series are all "player characters" developed by their game studios.
Player agency
Player versus environment (PvE)
Refers to fighting computer-controlled enemies (non-player characters), as opposed to player versus player (PvP).
Player versus player (PvP)
Refers to competing against other players, as opposed to player versus environment (PvE).
Player's handbook
Playthrough
The act of playing a game from start to finish, in one or several sessions.
Playtesting
A process in which game developers observe players (called playtesters) testing their game and what the user experience is like in real-time, in order to see where players get stuck, what information is and is not communicated clearly, and which gameplay elements are enjoyable or frustrating.
Pocket (pocketing)
Pocketing refers in multiplayer games to when a player (usually playing the part of a healer support) supports exclusively a single teammate (usually a tank), either at an extended period of time but with several teammates or during the entire match with a single teammate. This is done with the intent of assuring the supported player's survival during the time they are being supported. The term pocket refers either to the supporting player, or the supported player.
PogChamp

Great or awesome.
Point of no return
A point in a game from which the player cannot return to previous areas.
Pop-in
A noticeable change in an in-game graphical element's LOD.
Popping off
Used mostly in the context of esports competitions or video game streaming, a gamer is said to "pop off" when they unexpectedly perform exceptionally well in a video game for a short period of time. Within the Fighting game community, "pop off" can also be used to refer to a sudden and intense post match celebration.
Port
Postgame
Gameplay which takes place after completion of a game's storyline; the postgame may unlock new means to play the game, such as New Game Plus, additional minigames or sidegames, or even an additional, second storyline for the player to play through.
Power-up
An object that temporarily gives extra abilities or buffs to the game character. Persistent power-ups are called perks.
Power creep
The gradual unbalancing of a game due to successive releases of new content. The phenomenon may be caused by a number of different factors and, in extreme cases, can be damaging to the longevity of the game in which it takes place. Game expansions are usually stronger than previously existing content, giving consumers an incentive to buy it for competitions against other players or as new challenges for the single-player experience. While the average power level within the game rises, older content falls out of balance and becomes regressively outdated or relatively underpowered, effectively rendering it useless from a competitive or challenge-seeking viewpoint. Very occasionally may refer to the result of repeatedly balancing a game primarily through buffs and nerfs, thus making every character substantially more powerful than they were at release. See also: planned obsolescence.
Power spike
The moment in which a character sees a rise in relative strength from leveling up larger than that of a normal milestone. This is usually due to an item becoming available or certain abilities being unlocked.
P-rank
Often awarded in games for completing a level or challenge "perfectly", such as in the fastest time possible or by defeating an enemy without taking damage.
Pro
Shortened version of the word "professional". Someone with experience, skill, and especially know-how in a certain game.
Proc
The activation, trigger or occurrence of a conditional, often random, event. Particularly common for massively multiplayer online games, they are conditional events where special equipment provide the user with temporary extra powers, or when the opposing enemy suddenly becomes more powerful in some way. The term's origin is uncertain, possibly from programmed random occurrence, process, or procedure.
Procedural generation
A programming technique used by video game developers to automate the creation of video game levels and the game world, as opposed to the manual creation of levels and the game world, by hand. Programmers create algorithms which use computer-generated randomness to artificially create elements in a video game.
Pro gamer move
A strategic and tactical move that shows that the player is familiar with or skilled in a game and its gameplay mechanics. Sometimes used outside of video games, and occasionally used in an ironic manner to describe a poorly planned move or failure.
Professional gaming
Progression system
The game mechanics that determine how a player improves their player-character over the course of a game or several games, such as gaining experience points to level up characters, performing tasks to gain new abilities, or part of a metagame improvement.
PT
refers to 1) combat points (i.e., melee, range, etc.) and 2) skill points (i.e., beginner, expert, elite, master); often used as reference to meet requirements; to be able to equip armors, weapons, as well as for crafting weapons, ammunition and armors for specialists, and to unlock next tier skills (i.e., 30 beginner skill PT to unlock expert skills).
Pub
1. Short for public lobby, as opposed to a private lobby.
2. Players who play in public lobbies ("pubbies").
Public lobby
A multiplayer lobby composed of random players found using in-game matchmaking tools.
Publisher
The company that (in whole or in part) finances, distributes and markets the game. This is distinct from the developer, though the publisher may own the developer.
Pick-up group (PUG)
A group of players formed on the fly, usually to carry out a mutually beneficial task. PUGs will disband after the common objective has been achieved. Commonly used in MMORPGs.
Pulling
1. RPG terminology that refers to engaging in combat from a distance, with the intent of luring a hostile NPC (or a group) to the player's location to fight them there.
2. Gacha terminology that refers to spinning the wheel in hopes of obtaining a rare or high-quality item or character.
Puzzle video game
A broad genre of video games involving puzzle solving, often with abstract shapes.
PvE
PvP
Pwn
To dominate an opponent, usually another player.

== Q ==
QA
QQ
An emoji that looks like a pair of teary eyes. Used as a taunt that means "cry more". Originally referred to the shortcut Alt+Q+Q from Warcraft 2, used as an insult telling players to activate the shortcut which would quit the game. The phrase blew up so much, it made its way out of the Warcraft community and eventually evolved into "cry more".
QTE
Quality assurance
Quality Assurance teams for games will play through a title multiple times in an attempt to find and track down bugs, glitches and crashes in the game before it goes live. This process can start early in development and can last until after post-production. Not to be mistaken with playtesting.
Quality of life (QoL)
Features or improvements designed to make games easier, smoother to play, or more accessible, without changing fundamental aspects of the game's presentation, narrative, or gameplay.
Quest
Any objective-based activity created in-game for the purpose of either story (story quest) or character-level advancement (side quest). Quests follow many common types, such as defeating a number of specific monsters, gathering a number of specific items, or safely escorting a non-player character. Some quests involve more-detailed information and mechanics and are either greatly enjoyed by players as a break from the common monotony or are reviled as uselessly more-complicated than necessary.
Quick time event (QTE)
An event within a game that typically requires the player to press an indicated controller button or move a controller's analog controls within a short time window to succeed in the event and progress forward, while failure to do so may harm the player-character or lead to a game-over situation. Such controls are generally non-standard for the game, and the action performed in a quick time event is usually not possible to execute in regular gameplay.
Quicksave
1. A mechanism in a video game where progress to or from a saved game can be done by pressing a single controller button or keystroke, instead of opening a file dialog to locate the save file. Typically, there is only one quickload location and quicksaving will overwrite any previously saved state.
2. An option to use a one-time save which takes the player out of the game, allowing them to continue from where they last were and in the state they last were, thereby allowing the player to turn off the console or do something else with it without losing progress, but without gaining anything beyond that compared with not quicksaving. More common in handheld games, where an emphasis on short gameplay sessions encourages developers to give the player a way to play for shorter periods.
Quickscoping
A technique in first-person shooter video games used to attack a target by quickly aiming down sights on a weapon and immediately shooting.

== R ==
Rack
Radar
A smaller version of the play area, typically displayed in the corner of a players screen used for navigating the game world. May also display locations of friendly or enemy players.
Ragdoll

A type of procedural animation used by physics engines where static death animations have been replaced by a body going limp and collapsing in on itself, with the only animation acting on the body and its connected limbs being from the game's physics engine. This often gives the impression that a character is flailing or being flung around, like a rag doll.

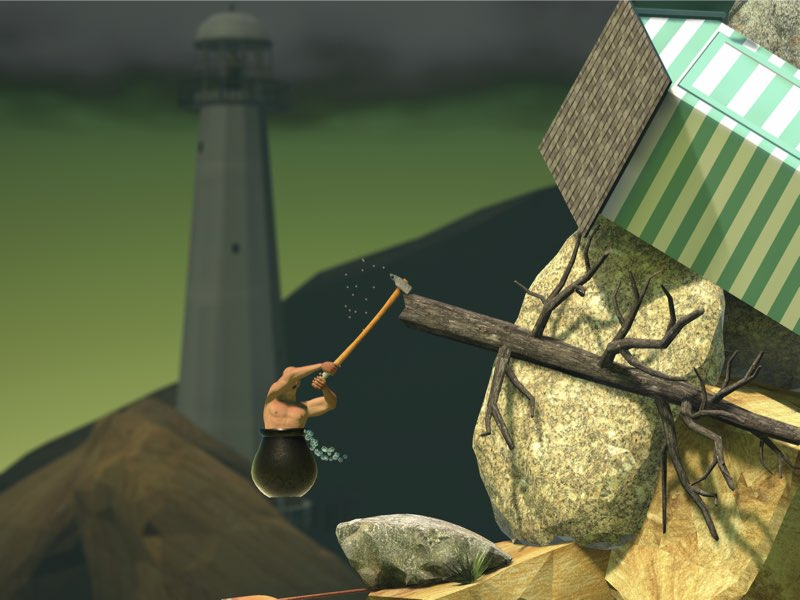
Getting Over It with Bennett Foddy has been described as a rage game.

Rage game
A genre designed to cause anger and frustration in the player, using unintuitive controls, unforeseeable obstacles, unfair challenges or taunting the player, often with the express stated purpose of causing the player to rage quit. Completing a rage game is commonly seen as a measure of determination and resolve as much as skill. Many fumblecore games are designed to obtusely difficult as to frustrate the player. Rage games typically differ from other hard game genres such as masocore games, kaizo games and precision platformers, which feature difficult but fair gameplay designed to challenge and improve the player's skill, agility and/or endurance.
Rage quit

The act of quitting a game mid-progress instead of waiting for the game to end. Typically, this is associated with leaving in frustration, such as unpleasant communication with other players, being annoyed, or losing the game. However, the reasons can vary beyond frustration, such as being unable to play due to the way the game has progressed, bad sportsmanship, or manipulating game statistics. Apparent rage quits may occur due to a player's game crashing, or the player experiencing network connection problems. There are also social implications of rage quitting, such as making other players rage quit. Certain games can penalize the player for leaving early. Sometimes the player may damage or even destroy the device, console, or controller the game is being played on.
Raid
A type of mission in a game where a number of people attempt to defeat either: (a) another number of people at player-vs-player (PVP), (b) a series of computer-controlled enemies (non-player characters; NPCs) in a player-vs-environment (PVE) battlefield, or (c) a very powerful boss (superboss).
Random encounter
A gameplay feature most commonly used in older Japanese role-playing games whereby combat encounters with non-player character (NPC) enemies or other dangers occur sporadically and at random without the enemy being physically seen beforehand.
Reactivity
Refers to the manner in which a game world reacts to and is changed by the player's choices. Examples include branching dialogue trees in an RPG, or detailed interacting systems in a simulation or strategy game. A reactive game world offers a greater number of possible outcomes to a given action, but increases the complexity and cost of development.
Real-time corruptor
A type of ROM/ISO corruptor program which incrementally and gradually corrupts video game data in real time as the game is being played for the purpose of finding amusing or interesting results. The rate at which the data is corrupted, and its severity can be changed by the user at will, enabling the game to be played in a corrupted state or to suddenly increase the intensity of the resultant glitches.
Real-time strategy (RTS)
A genre of video game where the player controls one or more units in real-time combat with human or computer opponents.
Reboot
A "restart" of a video game series, usually applying significant changes to characters, settings, gameplay, or the overall story, while still keeping identifiable elements of the original games. A reboot may also tie into or follow on from the original games directly whilst still intended to be a "starting point" for the series in question, this is sometimes referred to as a soft reboot.
Remake
A revamped version of an older game. Sharing many similarities to a remaster, a remake may take more liberties with the changes made to the gameplay, graphics, and story.
Remaster
A modernized version of an older video game intended to run on modern hardware, often with upgraded graphics and gameplay, but retaining the fundamental gameplay concepts and core story elements of the original game.
Remorting

Restarting a game with a new character from the lowest possible stats, after having maxed out a previous character.
Remote play
Playing a game on an owned device remotely over the internet.
Rendezook
A Battlefield trick shot whereupon during a dogfight, a player ejects from their jet, shoots down their pursuer using a rocket launcher while airborne, and then re-enters their jet.
Replay value
The ability to play a game again after its completion with reasonable enjoyment.
Respawn
The reappearance of an entity, such as a character or object, after its death or destruction. In some game, the player-character's death and respawns is penalized such as at the cost of lives, score, or game resources.
Respecing
In games where a player-character gains skills along a skill tree by spending points, the act of respecing ("re-specialization") allows the player to remove all skills and then respend those points on a different set of skills. This usually requires an expenditure of in-game money or other earned gameplay element.
Retrogaming

The playing or collecting of older personal computer, console, and arcade video games in contemporary times.
Review bomb
Actions taken by players to leave negative reviews of a game or other form of media on a digital storefront or user-contributed as a form of protest due to actions typically unrelated to the game or media quality itself or as a form of harassment to damage a games standing.
Revive
The act of restoring a defeated character or entity to life that is not removed from play after their health is gone; this is different from respawning, which only occurs typically without outside intervention and when a character is removed from play after their health has been depleted. Another common synonym is "rez".
Rez
A character's ability that allows them to perform a revive, or a command to use the same. Abbreviation for resurrect. When players can perform this on themselves, this is sometimes known as a self-rez.
Rhythm game
A genre of video game requiring the player to perform actions in time to the game's music.
RNG
Initialism of random number generation, which refers to computational methods that produce random (or, more accurately in most cases, pseudo-random) variability. In video games, this refers to gameplay elements that have unpredictable outcomes determined by such methods. Examples of such elements include random encounters, loot drops, and NPC behavior.
RNGesus
Personification of RNG, in a similar fashion to traditional personifications of Lady Luck, often addressed in humor to plead for more favourable RNG. Portmanteau of RNG and Jesus; also called RNGsus, RNJesus, RNGod, or Random Number God.
Ring out
1. In fighting games, to throw an opponent out of the arena, thereby winning.
2. A win obtained in this manner.
Rocket jumping

A tactic used in certain games that include physics simulation and rocket launchers or explosives. The player aims their weapon at or near their player-character's feet, or stand their character where there will be an explosion, and use the force of the blast to propel the character beyond normal jumping ability.
Roguelike
1. A sub-genre of games primarily featuring procedurally-generated levels, tile-based movement, turn-based action, complex maps to explore, resource management, and permanent death. Roguelikes are typically set in dungeons, but may contain an overworld or other settings. Roguelike games are usually designed to be more challenging than typical games, with luck and memory playing a larger role. Named after the 1980 game Rogue.
2. Games using procedurally-generated levels and permanent death that employ a wide variety of mechanics and visual styles not used by traditional, tile-based roguelikes. The term "Roguelite" is sometimes used to describe these types of games to differentiate them from traditional roguelikes.
Roguelite
See above.
Role-playing (RP)
A broad set of behaviours within video games where players change their behaviour to assume a role. Not exclusive to role-playing video games. Roleplaying may be as simple as a player acting to fit a medieval setting; as detailed as a player detailing their character's backstory, personal life, and mannerisms; or as complex as a MilSim game's clans having scheduled trainings, realistically long mission times, and military-like ranks and organization.
Role-playing video game (RPG)
A game in which the player takes on the role of a character or party of characters. These games focus on their advancement (such as increasing their level or gaining new abilities) and often use them to tell a detailed story.
Rolling the score
The act of achieving such a high score that the game's ability to display the score restarts, displays a negative number, or is otherwise unable to accurately display the score. Originates from early games that had limitations on the number that could be displayed as a score, such as pinball with a limited number of analog or digital number places, or video game systems with limited numbers of bytes. If a player's score exceeded that limit, it would cause an integer overflow, causing the display to 'roll over' and start again at the minimum possible score, or sometimes a negative number in 8-bit video games.
ROM hacking
The process of modifying a ROM image of a video game to alter the game's graphics, dialogue, levels, gameplay, or other elements. This is usually done by technically inclined video-game fans to make an old game more fresh, as a creative outlet, or to create entirely new experiences using the old game as a base "engine".
Room
1. A small, open area in a map, typically self-contained, surrounded by walls and connected to adjacent rooms by doors. In many cases, specific types of entities such as enemies cannot travel between rooms, while the player can. Rooms are often used to reduce lag by only loading the entities in the player's current room, ‘pausing’ all other rooms.
2. In adventure games, any discrete exterior or interior area in a map connected to other areas by exits. Text adventure game worlds usually consist of interconnected rooms navigated by compass directions with variations such as up, down, enter and exit. In text-and-graphic adventure games, illustrations accompany the rooms' text descriptions. Point-and-click adventure games feature illustrated rooms which the player can interact with using the pointer.
Room-over-room
The placement of a room directly above another room. This was impossible to achieve with the Doom engine which did mapping in 2D, with height variance done via numbers. In true 3D game engines to follow, such as those using the Quake engine, room-over-room became an easy effect to accomplish.
Round
RPG
1. Abbreviation of role-playing game.
2. In shooter games, a rocket-propelled grenade.
Rubber banding
1. A game mechanic resulting from dynamic game difficulty balancing that alters the rules of the game to keep the game competitive and fun. Most notable in racing games, where human players may easily outdistance computer opponents; when this happens, the computer opponents are often given the ability to go faster than normal or to avoid certain obstacles as to allow them to catch up and outpace the player. The effect is likened to stretching and releasing a rubber band between the player and the computer opponent. This effect may also apply to human players as well, with the game providing (often unstated) handicaps for losing players to stay competitive.
2. The result of network latency during a multiplayer game; when the player's location is updated client-side, but the server does not immediately register the change, a player's character may 'bounce' to the appropriate location when the client and server finally synchronize.
Rush
A tactic in strategy games where the player sacrifices economic development in favor of using many low-cost fast/weak units to rush and overwhelm an enemy by attrition or sheer numbers. Can also be used to refer to a quick "rush" onto an objective or point, with the intention to overwhelm by surprise or speed.

== S ==
S Rank
An achievement awarded to a player in a single level, song, round, or stage by finishing them without "Miss" or any mistakes, or taking damage, or for getting the highest scores or percentage cleared (usually above 90% or 98%). The term can mean a high rating level or a rarity of an item or character within the confines of the game (as valuated by the developer), but it is also used by players in tier lists to refer to the top of the video game meta.
Sandbox game
A game with a gameplay element that gives the player a great degree of creativity to complete tasks towards a goal within the game, if such a goal exists. Some games exist as pure sandbox games with no objectives; these are also known as non-games or software toys. Very common examples of sandbox games are ones where the player has the ability to create, modify, or destroy their environment, i.e., a game that includes some form of a game creation system. The term alludes to a child's sandbox where the child can create and destroy with no given objective. While 'open world' and 'sandbox' are sometimes used interchangeably (or with only the implication of 'sandbox' being smaller), the terms refer to different concepts and are not synonymous.
Save point
A place in the game world of a video game where the player's progress in the game can be saved. Often, when the player dies or receives a Game Over, their progress will be reset back to the last Save Point that they used. Some games do not have specific save points, allowing the player to save at any point.
Save scumming
The manipulation of game save states to gain an advantage during play or achieve a particular outcome from unpredictable events. It is used, for example, in Roguelike games that automatically delete any save files when the player-character dies or in games that use an RNG system to calculate bonuses or item drops in order to achieve an optimal outcome.
Saved game

A file or similar data storage method that stores the state of the game in non-volatile memory, enabling the player to shut down the gaming system and then later restart the device and load the saved game state to continue playing from where they saved. Saved games may also be used to store the game's state before a difficult area that, should the player-character die, the player can try again without penalty.
Screen cheat

The act of looking at other players' areas of the screen when playing split-screen multiplayer, giving the screen cheater an unfair advantage. The 2014 game Screencheat derives both its name and core gameplay from this act.
Score attack
A mode of gameplay that challenges the player to earn the highest score possible in a game level or through the whole game.
Scuffed
Poor quality.
Season
1. The full set of downloadable content that is planned to be added to a video game, which can be entirely purchased with a season pass
2. A finite period of time in a massively multiplayer online game in which new content, such as themes, rules, modes, et cetera, becomes available, sometimes replacing prior time-limited content. Notable games that use this system include Star Wars: Battlefront II and Fortnite Battle Royale.
Season pass
A purchase made in addition to the cost of the base game that generally enables the purchaser access to all downloadable content that is planned for that title without further cost.
Second-party developer
A developer which, despite not being owned by a console maker nonetheless produces games solely for that maker's consoles. Often they have a special arrangement involved. Due to the ambiguity from the player's perspective, these developers are often referred to as first-party developers. Games developed by second-party developers are often called 'second-party games.'
Secret character
A player character that is only available to the player after meeting some sort of requirement; such as beating the game, completing optional challenges, entering cheat codes or even hacking the game (as some secret characters may be intended to not be in the game, but are still present in the game's code). Secret characters may initially appear as NPCs.
Secret level
A game level that is only accessible to the player by completing specific tasks within the game; these tasks are rarely described in detail to the player, if at all, and are often only found through exploration and trial and error, or even by hacking, if the level was not intended to be in the game, but is still present in the game's code.
Sequence breaking
Manipulating a game to carry out events out of their intended order. Sequence breaking can be used to speedrun a game, obtain desirable items earlier in a game's story than intended, unlock content faster, or induce other glitches that may be utilised for advantageous means.
Shoot 'em up (SHMUP)
A sub-genre of the shooter genre, where a single, usually mobile character has to shoot at enemies while all of the enemies attacking or moving toward it. The player character will typically have no allies, is extremely fragile, has little non-hazardous terrain to deal with, lacks any reload time for their basic weapon, and will gain power-ups to improve their abilities. Strongly associated with spaceships, but other player characters may be used. Sometimes conflated with shooters in general.
Shooter
A genre of video game that involves using ranged weapons.
Shoto
In fighting games, a character who has a projectile, an anti-air attack, and an attack that moves them forward. The term originates from the Street Fighter series, where Ryu and Ken were the first characters to use this moveset.
Shovelware
A poor quality, low-budget video game, often developed quickly alongside a large quantity of other shovelware. These often have a licensed property associated with them to increase their chances of being bought by an unsuspecting customer.
Shoulder button
A larger button usually placed on the rear or top of a gamepad that is usually pressed or held down with the index or middle finger. It can also be used as a modifier for certain actions performed with analog stick movement or face button presses.
Show mode
Side-scrolling video game

A game in which the action is viewed from a side-view camera angle and the screen follows the player as they move.
Side quest
An optional quest which does not advance the main quest.
Simulation video game (sim)
A game genre that simulates some aspect of reality and is usually open-ended with no intrinsic goal. Inclusive definitions allow for any video game that models reality, such as sports games, while exclusive definitions generally focus on city-building games, vehicle simulation games, or both.
Simcade
A term for a simulator that combines its serious elements with the fun factor of an arcade video game. Often used as a derogatory term by opponents of certain videogames.
Single-player
A game that can only have one player at a time.
Sistering
The act of two or more guilds banding together to become stronger. This is done to make certain tasks easier with frequent cooperation between guilds, and more.
Skill issue
A derogatory term that implies an opponent player is unskilled. Can be used to dismiss complaints about a game or to trash-talk an opponent.
Skill tree

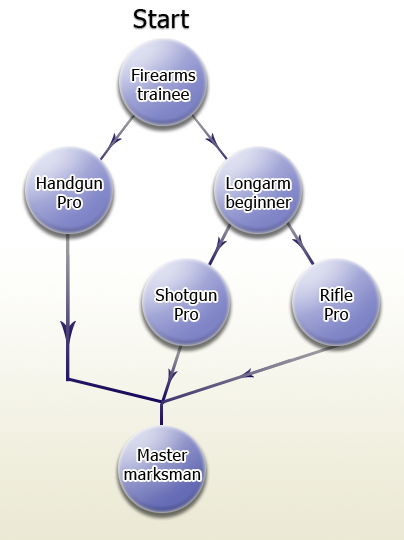
A simplified example of a skill tree structure, in this case for the usage of firearms

A character-development gaming mechanic typically seen in role-playing games. A skill tree consists of a series of skills (sometimes known as perks) which can be earned as the player levels up or otherwise progresses their player-character. These skills grant gameplay benefits; for example, giving the character the ability to perform a new action, or giving a boost to one of the character's stats. A skill tree is called a "tree" because it uses a tiered system and typically branches out into multiple paths. A tiered skill tree will require a player to achieve certain skills before the next tier of skills become available. The player may be required to achieve all skills in one tier before moving on to the next, or may only be required to complete prerequisites for individual branches. Skill trees are a common tool used for in-game balancing by game designers. Skill trees also offer a "game within a game" in which players are not only playing a video game, but their decisions on how they allocate points into their skill trees will affect their overall gaming experience. Some games allow for respecing while with others the changes are permanent. The action roleplaying game Diablo II, released in 2000, is often cited as the true innovator of in-depth skill trees.
Skin
A customization option for a player's in-game avatar or equipment that changes its appearance. Skins are featured as part of metagame loot drops, with most games rewarding them based on scarcity or by awarding skins for completing certain objectives or placing high in competitive modes. This enables players to display rare achievements or high skill level. Skins can also be obtained through in-app purchases or from game currency, depending on the game and the developer's monetization methodology. In gacha games, for instance, skins of some characters may require the purchase of a bundle, while others are more easily accessible through spending diamonds acquired in the game instead of the player's cash. Skins may be only decorative, or they can also provide the character with stat boosts.
Skirmish mode
A game mode in which players can fight immediate battles without having to go through the linear, story-based campaign mode. It is popular in real-time strategy games.
SMP
See
Smurf
In online multiplayer games that use matchmaking, a new or much lower-ranked account used by an experienced player in order to be matched with a new and inexperienced opponent who can be easily defeated. The concept is similar to hustling and sandbagging that can be found in gambling and board games.
Snowballing
A situation where a player or faction is able to leverage a small advantage into a larger and larger advantage. An example of a snowball effect.
Softlock
A situation where further progress in a game becomes impossible, but the game itself does not crash (or hard lock). An example of a no-win situation, softlocks can occur as the result of glitches in gameplay, the use of corruptors, sequence breaking, or as a result of poor game design. Sierra was well-known to purposely implement softlock situations into their games.
Sound test
A page or option in which the game makes noise to confirm that the player's audio equipment is working and at a good volume. Usually known for containing the soundtrack and sound effects of a video game, with the ability to freely listen to them being a secondary function.
Soulsborne
A soulslike game developed by FromSoftware, a portmanteau of Dark Souls and Bloodborne.
Soulslike
A game genre based on gameplay from the Dark Souls series, typically containing high levels of difficulty, stamina-based combat, and the prominent use of lore and environmental storytelling.
Spamming
Repeated use of the same item or action (e.g. chat message, combo, weapon). Often used generally to describe such repeated uses, but sometimes used pejoratively when the item or action is considered overpowered or annoying, such as an overreliance on rocket launchers in shooter games.
Spawn
The action of the player, enemy, or game object being generated at a spawn point within the game world. Also see respawn.
Spawn camping
Spawn killing
In PvP games, the act of killing other players at their spawn point, often immediately after they have spawned. Usually looked down upon as unfair for not giving opposing players a chance, though some gamers defend it as a legitimate strategy. Many games have features to prevent spawn killing, such as temporary invincibility or barriers preventing enemies from entering or attacking in spawns. A component of, but not entirely the same as, spawn camping.
Spawn point
A location in the game world where the player-character, non-player characters including enemies, or objects, such as weapons, ammunitions, and health items, are generated when they are created or "spawned" into the game. Part of game design is determining spawn point locations and quantities to work within the game's economy.
Spectator mode
1. A game mode that allows a player to view the world without restrictions, but without being able to interact with the game world in any way.
2. A game mode that allows a player to view the world from another player's perspective.
Specialization
A means of selecting certain options—such as a character, weapon, vehicle, or other in-game item—during the course of a game for a specific function, as opposed to selecting a specific character class at the start of the game. Such specialization allows that entity to have access to unique skills or options for that type while denying them access to other options. Some games allow players to re-specialize past choices for some in-game cost and pursue a different specialization.
Specs
Short for specifications, used to describe the details of a player's stats, gear, or build.
Speedrun
An attempt to complete a game as fast as possible. Depending on the rules for the speedrun, players may exploit glitches or bugs in the game to speed their progress.
Splash damage

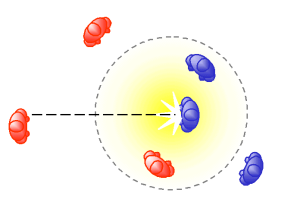
Although only the blue player in the center takes a direct hit, everyone within the circle takes splash damage. The damage may decrease further from the point of impact; this is known as damage falloff.

Attacks with an explosive or other area-of-effect component deal splash damage, affecting the area around the attack's impact. Splash damage is particularly useful against game targets that dodge well. However, splash damage weapons are also dangerous since they can damage the shooter and are not preferred in close-quarters combat. Such weapons are typically aimed at an opponent's feet; this ensures that the impact point is near enough for splash damage to cover the opponent in the event that the shot misses. Usually splash damage is separate from the damage of a direct hit with an attack, and the two may or may not both affect the target. Often there is damage falloff, meaning the further away from the center of the attack a target is, the lower the splash damage.
Split-screen multiplayer
A game that presents two or more views seen by different players in a multiplayer game on the same display unit.
Spray and pray
The act of blindly firing an automatic weapon with the intent of potentially hitting the target; tends to be ineffective.
Sprite
A 2D image used as a part of a larger graphical scene. Typically, sprites define all objects and entities within games that use 2D graphics, but they are sometimes also used in earlier 2.5D and 3D games.
Squeaker
A usually derogatory term that refers to young tween and preteen gamers that use voice chat, the word referring to their high-pitched voice as a result of them not having hit puberty yet.
Stage
Stamina
1. A resource that allows the player to use certain types of physically exerting actions, such as running and attacking, that typically replenishes over time.
2. A type of stat that governs a character's ability to take damage, either raising their health or increasing their defense.
Stat point
A discrete number of points for the player to distribute among their character's attributes, e.g., to choose their player's trade-offs between strength, charisma, and stamina.
Stat squish
A practice of scaling down numbers, commonly score or health points, damage or healing values, or item levels, in the aftermath of a stat inflation as numbers get exponentially large and more difficult for the player to conceptualize. The practice is most common in MMORPGs, and World of Warcraft is notable for having several stat squishes.
Status effect
An overarching term that covers both buffs and debuffs. Essentially, any effect to a character that is outside of the normal baseline is a status effect. Common negative status effects are poisoning (damage over time), petrification/paralysis (inability to move), or armor/damage reduction (lowering of defensive/offensive abilities). Common positive status effects include a heal-over-time (a small, pulsing heal that triggers multiple times over a set period), armor/damage increases, or speed increases.
Strafing
To move sideways, often to dodge incoming attacks while keeping the camera on the enemy.
Strategy guide
Printed or online manuals that are written to guide players through a game, typically offering maps, lists of equipment, moves, abilities, enemies, and secrets, and providing tips and hints for effective play strategies.
Strategy video game
A game genre which emphasizes consideration and planning to achieve victory. Subgenres include real-time strategy, turn-based strategy and wargames.
Stream-sniping
When a player watches another (usually professional) player livestream a game to locate their position or plans and gain the upper hand on them, typically to gain attention through the streamer's audience, or to disrupt or sabotage their gameplay. This practice most commonly occurs in online multiplayer games and is generally frowned upon.
Streaming media
Video and audio that is continuously fed from a server to a client and presented to the end user. In gaming, this may be used to watch a live or recorded Let's Play demonstration of a game, or to play a game through cloud gaming.
Stun lock
A situation whereby the player character cannot act for a long period of time due to being periodically stunned. Often caused by being staggered by repeated attacks from multiple enemies.
Subgame
Superboss
An optional super powerful boss, typically more powerful and harder to beat than the game's main final boss.
Support

In many multiplayer shooters, the player that provides team mates with utility items.
Survival game
A game set in a hostile open-world environment where characters are challenged to collect resources, craft items, and survive as long as possible.
Survival mode
A type of game mode in co-operative multiplayer games. Players work together to defend one or more objectives or simply to have at least one man standing as they fight through discrete waves of enemies, with each subsequent wave featuring more numerous and powerful enemies. Such modes often include elements of tower defense games where players can deploy defensive tools such as turrets or traps to injure or slow enemies. The game may offer short periods between waves where players can spend in-game currency or similar points to improve their defenses, their equipment, or similar boosts. Horde modes can be based on a fixed number of waves or in an endless mode where players attempt to last as long as possible.
Survival multiplayer
A multiplayer game mode where players start out with no items, a health bar, and are able to die (as opposed to creative mode, where players are immortal). Commonly used to refer to Minecraft servers, but can otherwise be used to refer to any similar game mode in any game. A well-known example is the Dream SMP.
Sweat

A derogatory term used to refer to players with a highly competitive attitude, typically in situations where such an attitude is uncalled for or unnecessary. Synonymous with tryhard.

== T ==
T-pose
A positioning of a character model in a video game with the character standing upright and arms up to the side. Typically used as a default position for 3D character models, this is often seen in games as a glitch or result of software bugs.
Tank

A character with high health and abilities or equipment that mitigate damage, draw aggro from opponents, and/or receive enemy attacks so that teammates can concentrate on their attacks or objectives. Common in MMORPGs.
Tank controls
A character movement control system in which up and down directional inputs move the player character forward or backward, while sideways directional inputs rotates the character, similar to how a tank's movement is controlled.
Targeting

A strategy used in online games where the player continuously kills or attacks the same opponent, ignoring the others surrounding them. It is often seen as unsportsmanlike behaviour in gaming.
Taunt
A tactic and an effect used during turn-based fights in which a character (usually with high defense or hit points (HP) – see Tank) tricks opponents into attacking him/herself instead of the rest of the team.
2. A move in a fighting game where one player presses a specific input or inputs to make their character play an animation which usually deals no damage and serves merely to mock their opponent.
Teabagging
A type of action used in multiplayer games where a victorious player-character repeatedly crouches down and stands back up (functions that are a common part of standard gameplay) over the head of knocked down or dead opponent, simulating the sexual act of the same name. The act is usually considered disrespectful and provocative, intended to irritate their opponents and make them act irrationally. While the act of teabagging is generally associated with first or third-person shooters, similar actions in other game genres have become synomous with teabagging.
Team deathmatch
Teamkill
The killing of teammates through destruction or damage done to allies, such as through deliberate shooting of teammates. Teamkilling is often identified as unsportsmanlike behavior.
Technology tree

A branching series of technologies that can be researched in strategy games, to customize the player's faction..
Telefrag
A frag or kill which occurs when a player uses a teleporter to get to a location occupied by another character. This character is killed and the player-character landing on them is granted credit for the kill.
Telegraphing
1. Animations or similar visual and audible indicators that indicate to a player what actions an opponent will take. Often used as part of computer-controlled artificial intelligence to help the player avoid or block attacks or make counter-attacks.
2. In multiplayer games, the actions a player does, revealing to their opponent or opponents what attack they may do next. Usually considered a sign of predictability, but for some characters it may be necessary.
Test room
A secret level that is used by developers to test the movements, actions and control of a game's player character(s). They are usually removed or hidden from regular access before the game is released.
Texture
An image that is mapped onto a 3d model.
Theory
Theorycraft
The analysis of a video game to mathematically determine the most-optimal approach to winning the game, typically in games that feature a number of player-character attributes that are enumerated. One common type of theorycraft is determining how to best maximize damage per second through selection of equipment and skills..
Third party
When two teams or players are in a fight and a third team or player attempts to kill one or both of the teams. The term was likely popularized in battle royale games such as Fortnite but is also used in first-person shooters.
Third person
A view where the player character is seen on screen.
Third-person shooter (TPS)
A genre of 3d game player from a third-person point of view where the primary mechanic is the use of guns and other ranged weapons to defeat enemies.
Throwing
Losing a game on purpose, or losing a game badly. Mostly used in competitive, team-based games.
Thumbstick
Tick
An increment of damage or healing periodically caused by a DoT or HoT effect.
Tickrate
The rate at which a game server runs simulation steps.
Tier list
A hierarchical organization of various gameplay elements, such as characters, classes, weapons, or abilities, organized into "tiers" based on their perceived usefulness. An element placing in the top or bottom tiers of this list can be called top-tier or bottom-tier, respectively, with similar terminology describing elements as high-tier, mid-tier, or low-tier.
Tile-matching video game
A type of puzzle video game where the player manipulates tiles in order to make them disappear according to a matching criterion. If this number is three, the game is called a match-3 game.
Tilt
When a player gets angry at someone or something, often resulting in reduced quality of play.
Time attack
A game mode that challenges player(s) to complete a level or the game within a fixed amount of game time or in the fastest time possible. Often, the best times are recorded for other players to see.
Timed exclusive
When a game releases exclusively for one platform but may release for other platforms when the exclusivity period expires.
Time to kill (TTK)
The average amount of time it takes to kill an opponent. Commonly used in first-person shooters, especially tactical shooters, where it is typically representative of how much damage or shots a character can take before dying, and thus also the game's realism.
Title screen

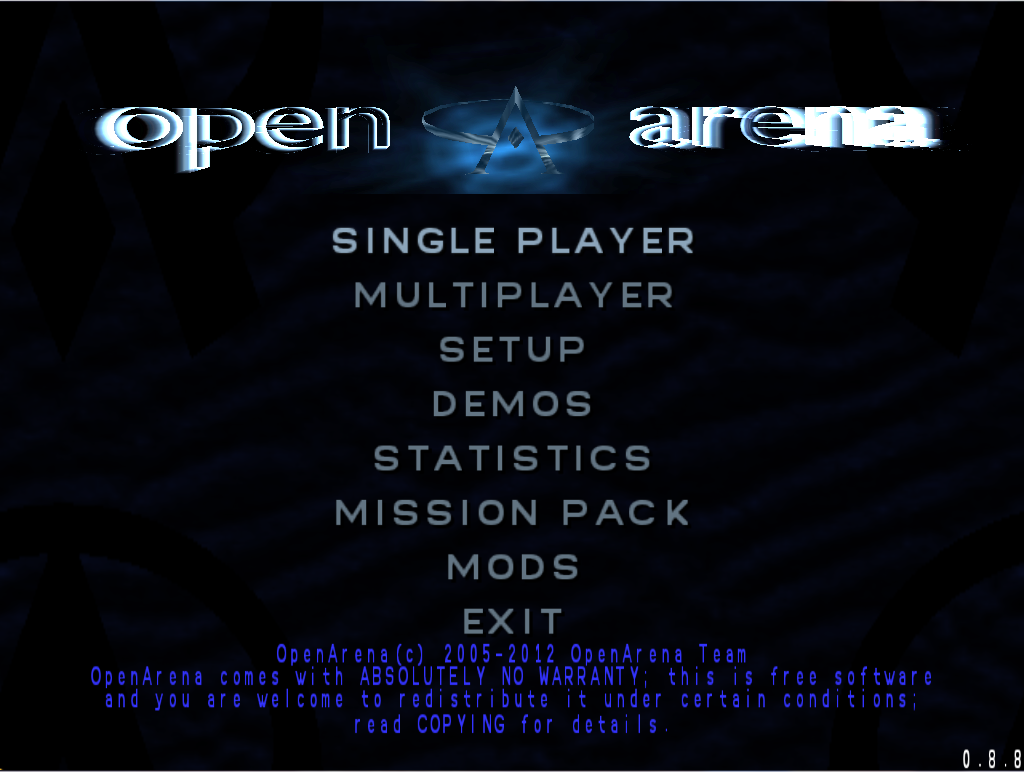
OpenArena title screen

The initial screen of a computer, video, or arcade game after the credits and logos of the game developer and publisher are displayed. Early title screens often included all the game options available (single player, multiplayer, configuration of controls, etc.) while modern games have opted for the title screen to serve as a splash screen. This can be attributed to the use of the title screen as a loading screen, in which to cache all the graphical elements of the main menu. Older computer and video games had relatively simple menu screens that often featured pre-rendered artwork.

In arcade games, the title screen is shown as part of the attract mode loop, usually after a game demonstration is played. The title screen and high score list urge potential players to insert coins. In console games, especially if the screen is not merged with the main menu, it urges the player to press start. Similarly, in computer games, the message "Hit any key" is often displayed. Controls that lack an actual "Start" button use a different prompt; the Wii, for example, usually prompts the player to press both letter buttons on the Wii Remote simultaneously, as in Super Mario Galaxy 2 or Mario Party 9. Fan-made games often parody the style of the title that inspired them.
Touchscreen
A form of user input that relies on physical touch, rather than a mouse, keyboard or other control method.
Toxicity
Actions of a rude and unwelcoming gamer or gaming community that detriments the experience for other players or developers. Almost universally viewed negatively across gaming, some game developers take measures to stymie toxicity in their games.
Tower dive
Commonly used in MOBAs to define the act of going into range of the opponent's tower, a defensive structure that damages its opponents, to kill low-health targets.
Trackball
A form of a video game controller, most often found on arcade game cabinets, in which the player uses a freely-rotating ball to interact with the game.
Transmogrification or transmog
Changing the appearance of gear, such as weapons and armor, typically to that of functionally equivalent gear.
Trash
1. A term meaning bad or poor, often used to insult a player(s) in online PvP games, but also used for items, spells, etc.
2. Commonly used in MMORPGs to refer to groups of non-boss enemies. Particularly in dungeons/ areas leading up to boss fights.
Trick-shot
A shot that requires significant skill to make. Usually associated with first-person shooters.
Trickjump
Any type of unusual jump that demonstrates skill and expertise, often considered an exploit that was unforeseen by the game's creators.
Triple A
Triple jump
Being able to jump twice in mid-air after leaving the ground, and must then typically touch the ground before being able to mid-air jump again.
True ending
In a game with multiple endings, the "true ending" is the ending that most fully and definitively resolves the game's storyline. True endings are sometimes designed to be inaccessible until a player has already reached other endings of the game.
True Last Boss (TLB)
Can be similar to a. Primarily in s, A boss in a game that is exceptionally difficult, and has specific requirements outside of a normal game clear that must be met in order to reach the boss.
Tryhard
An insult that means a gamer is ruining the fun of the game due to an inordinate obsession with winning. Also known as playing sweaty.
Turn-based game
When a game consists of multiple turns. When one player's turn is complete, they must wait until everyone else has finished their turn.
Turtling
A gameplay strategy that emphasizes heavy defense, with little or no offense. A player who turtles minimizes risk to themselves while baiting opponents to take risks in trying to overcome the defenses.
Twinking
A practice in MMORPGs of equipping a low-level character with items or resources not normally available to new characters, by transfer from high-level characters.

== U ==
Underpowered
A character, item, tactic, or ability considered to be too weak to be a balanced element of gameplay.
Underworld
A collection of isolated dungeon-, cave-, or hell-like levels which are connected by an open overworld.
Unfinished
Used to describe games that release in a very buggy state, or with missing/poor-quality content, such that it gives the impression of having been fully released before development was properly completed (whether or not this is the case). Compare beta release.
Unlockable
A piece of content that is obtained in-game by fulfilling certain conditions. These are sometimes represented in-game or represented through a platform-wide system of achievements. Such content can be purely cosmetic, a game mechanic, tool, character, a separate video game, and more. They are sometimes hidden Easter eggs.
Ultimate
Ultimate attacks or abilities (or ults) that a character may possess, often those that are the strongest or that deal the most damage. Ults often require an energy bar, charge meter, or other similar resource which must be filled before the ult can be used.
Upgrade
A game mechanic to make a given item, character, etc. more powerful. Equipment is commonly upgraded through crafting while a character upgrade may be an alternative to advancing a character level.

== V ==
VAC
An abbreviation of Valve Anti-Cheat, Valve Corporation's cheat detection software. Players who are caught using cheats on a VAC-secured server will be issued a VAC ban, banning them from VAC-secured servers for that particular game in the future and putting a mark on their Steam profile that can't be hidden from public view. VAC bans are permanent, non-negotiable, and cannot be removed by Steam Support. Players who have gotten a VAC ban are sometimes referred to as going on a "permanent VACation".
Vaporware
Video games which are announced and appear in active development for some time but are never released nor officially cancelled.
Video game design
The process of designing a video game, including content and game mechanics.
Virtual economy (in game money)
A term used to describe the economy in a video game, for example, gold and the auction house in Old School RuneScape money can be used to buy in game gear, all the way to in-game cosmetics.
Virtual reality (VR)
An interactive computer-generated experience taking place within a simulated environment. Used in video gaming primarily to describe a VR-based video game or a VR option for an otherwise non-VR video game.
Visual novel
A genre of video games with interactive stories. These games typically use static imagery, anime-styled character art (thanks in part to the popularity of the genre in Japan), and detailed backgrounds, with character dialogue presented in text boxes. Players may alter the path of the story by choosing from dialog trees or a small list of actions.

== W ==
Waggle
A pejorative term when one must shake a controller to do an action, regardless of how the controller is shaken. Usually implies that the controller needs to be shaken wildly. Sometimes extended to motion controls in general, ignoring any precision required.
Walking simulator
A term sometimes used to classify exploration games, which generally involve exploring an environment for story and narrative but with few, if any, puzzles or gameplay elements. May be considered derogatory but is often used as a neutral term.
Walkthrough
A description of the gameplay experience for a level or playthrough, intended to guide players who are unsure how to complete it.
Wall bang

In first or third person shooters, the act of shooting someone through a wall or object with bullets or other projectiles that have the ability to penetrate an obstacle. Made a popular term by games such as Counter-Strike and Call of Duty.
Wall climb
The ability for a video game character to rapidly scale a vertical wall or similar surface, typically as part of the character's passive abilities, but may be aided with a tool such as a grappling hook. This often appears in platform games alongside abilities like wall jumping and double jumping.
Wall jump
A jump performed off of a vertical surface to propel the player higher in the opposite direction. Wall jumps can be done between two tight walls in quick succession to climb vertically in some games, though some games such as Mega Man X and Transformice allow the player to repeatedly jump on a single wall. As a special jump, it is sometimes an acquired skill instead of available from the game's start.
Wallhack
A cheat that makes walls translucent. Some wallhacks let players shoot weapons or physically pass through walls.
Wall run
The ability for a video game character to appear to run along a vertical wall for a short distance without falling off. Common in games featuring parkour-type movement.
Wanted level
A game mechanic popularized by the Grand Theft Auto series and used in many Grand Theft Auto clone games. A player's actions in an open-world game may cause non-player characters, often representing law enforcement, to chase the player, with the response becoming more significant at higher wanted levels. The wanted level persists unless the player can elude these opponents, or if the character dies, eliminating the wanted level.
Warp zone
A shortcut that allows a player to bypass one or more sections of the game.
WASD keys
A common control-mechanism using a typical QWERTY keyboard, with the W, A, S, and D keys bound to movement controls. This allows arrow key-like control with the left hand.
Wave
In game genres or modes where player(s) are to defend a or stay alive as long as possible, enemies are commonly grouped into "waves" (sometimes referred to as levels). When one wave of enemies is defeated, player(s) are typically given a short period to prepare for the next wave.
Weekly
An in-game objective in live service games that offers optional rewards and can be completed every week.
Whale
In free-to-play games, a user who spends a considerable amount of real-world money for in-game items, rather than acquiring said items through grinding or playing the game normally. These players are typically seen as the largest segment for revenue production for free-to-play titles. Exceptionally high spenders may be called white whales or leviathans. Borrowed from gambling jargon; a 'whale', in that context, is a person who makes extravagant wagers or places reckless bets.
Wipe
1. An attack from the boss in which the said boss completely knocks out the entire party. Mostly in massively multiplayer online role-playing games.
2. An event intentionally resetting all game progress or deleting the save file - i.e., after major updates in early access games.
World
A series of levels that share a similar environment or theme. A boss fight will typically happen once all or most of these levels are completed rather than after each individual level.
World compression
The representation of a world on a much smaller scale than is realistic. For example, in many role-playing games, it is possible for the player character to walk across a continent in sometimes under a minute, and the player character may appear to be several kilometers tall given the relative scale. This is not the same as the player being much larger than the icon for a town or other settlement, but rather that a distance which is given as hundreds of kilometers appears to be much smaller. In some cases, such as in Final Fantasy VIII, trains will run between towns despite the visibly short distance. For voxel games such as Minecraft, the in-game narrative may refer to a distance as being tens of kilometers away, while the actual distance may be accurately measured by counting only a few hundred blocks understood to each be one meter across.
Wrapping
A principle for structuring a game world or portraying its map that allows a player to move in a straight line and get back to the point where they started moving, reaching it from the opposite direction, similar to walking along the circumference of a sphere in a straight line. This was often used in older games to make it seem that the player is moving up or down an extremely high hill; memory can be saved by using wrapping instead of creating a larger area filled with impassable walls. Wrapping is also used to make a 2D game world round; for example, in Pac-Man, exiting the game screen to the right wraps the player to the same position on the left side of the screen. Similarly, in Final Fantasy VII, exiting the game map to the right wraps the player to the same position on the left side of the map, and exiting the map to the top wraps the player to the bottom of the map.

== X ==
Ximmer
A term used to refer to console players who use an Xbox Input Machine (XIM) to use mouse-and-keyboard controls or other control units for games that do not officially support them. "Ximmer" is generally considered derogatory as this method is typically associated with cheating in multiplayer games, with such players having finer control over a game compared to a typical controller; however, this method also has valid uses to aid video game accessibility.
XP

== Y ==
YouTube bait

Games that are made for YouTubers or Twitch streamers.

== Z ==
Zerging

Tactic in strategy games in which the player uses overwhelming numbers of inexpensive, disposable units rather than skill or strategy. The term comes from the Zerg, a race in StarCraft that uses numerical advantage to overwhelm opponents.
Zero-day patch
A software security patch that fixes a Zero-day vulnerability. See: Zero-day and 0-day warez.
Zero-player game

A game that has no sentient players and only has CPUs.
Zone
1. A section of a MUD or MMO's shared environment within which communications may be limited or game mechanics altered to encourage certain types of gameplay.
2. A synonym for world, most popularly used within the Sonic the Hedgehog series.
Zoning
A fighting game strategy that involves continuously using long range attacks and projectiles. Characters who specialize in this type of play are called zoners.

== See also ==
- List of video game genres
- MUD terminology
