= Telegraphing (entertainment) =

Telegraphing, in the creation or performance of creative works, is conveying information to the audience through acting or nonverbal clues, providing a clear hint of the meaning or outcome of a dramatic action. Telegraphing may undercut suspense by advance disclosure or extreme hinting of an element in a composition, narrative plot, or recitation. A familiar example is stand-up comic and comedy films "telegraphing" the punch line of a joke, i.e. making its outcome obvious before it happens. This meaning for the term was coined shortly after the invention of the telegraph.

In music and the visual arts, such techniques are respected as means of preparing the audience by "building up" to the foreseeable result, as musical overtures usually do. In role-playing games such as live-action role-playing it may refer to non-verbal communication with other players through gestures to convey the intentions of the player outside the game.

Telegraphing is often compared to foreshadowing as a way to reveal incoming plot and make the listener form expectations. While foreshadowing doesn't necessarily reveal that the introduced element will play a role later, telegraphing conveys information to spectators about how the plot will develop. Contrast it with red herring, where the plot element revealed in advance is intended to be misleading.

In literature telegraphing is generally seen as lessening the final effect by approaching it too gradually, and thus as a failure of literary technique. Information used too often to telegraph about characters can be overused and become clichéd, such as a dumb police officer eating doughnuts, an absent-minded professor, or a beautiful librarian concealed by unattractive personal grooming.

== See also ==
- Telegraphing (sports)
