= Telegraphing (sports) =

Sporting terminology

In sporting terminology, to telegraph is to unintentionally alert an opponent to one's immediate situation or intentions. The sporting use of the term telegraph draws a direct comparison with the communication device of the same name. "Telegraphing" always refers to a reflexive physical action rather than a protracted or intentional give-away. For example, a boxer rotating his shoulders to throw a hook would be telegraphing. A rugby team betraying its line-out plays by using an easily decoded line-out code is not telegraphing.

While telegraphing is a hazard for any sporting event, it is particularly risky at upper levels of competition where talented players are better able to anticipate and react to telegraphed actions. The ability to suppress telegraphing, and pick up on the telegraphing of other players, is often a hallmark of elite athletes.

== Use in various sports ==
=== Martial arts and combat sports ===
The most widespread telegraph in all unarmed combat is to look directly at an intended target on the opponent's body. This is one of the reasons that competitors are encouraged to look their opponents in the eyes or shoulders when engaged in combat.

The term telegraph is arguably used most often in boxing. This will usually take the form of boxers moving their shoulders in a specific manner before throwing a punch. This can also refer to boxers whose overall movement is so slow that it can be anticipated by an opponent.

In martial arts that utilise legs as well as arms for striking, telegraphing often involves hip movements used to shift bodyweight. Wing chun is one martial art that attempts to avoid this pitfall by using uncommitted techniques.

=== Ice hockey ===
Ice hockey players tend to telegraph larger, more forceful actions such as slap shots or body checks. Telegraphing is not avoided as it is hoped that the forcefulness of the action is great enough to overcome its predictability.

=== Baseball ===
In baseball, pitchers can telegraph their selected pitch by allowing the batter to see their finger position. It is considered a basic skill to keep the pitching hand hidden in the glove as long as possible during a pitch. If the pitcher is failing to do this, he is said to be "tipping his pitches".

The split-finger fastball is one pitch that draws its success mainly by falsely telegraphing a straight fastball to the batter.

=== Cricket ===
In cricket, bowlers (spin bowlers even more so than fast or seam bowlers) can telegraph the trajectory and expected landing position of the ball, the likely direction of deviation after pitching, the amount of bounce etc. by allowing the batsman to see their finger position and the seam position of the ball at the time of release.

=== American Football ===
The quarterback in American football can telegraph where he is going to throw by following a certain receiver with his eyes. He can also telegraph when he is about to throw the ball by changing his grip on the ball.

=== Basketball ===
Basketball players can telegraph their passes if they continuously look at the intended teammate. This often results in a steal.

=== Poker ===
Poker is one of the few non-sporting events to frequently use the term. This is because those players who do betray their intentions, do so when they fail to suppress physical reflexes (such as blinking nervously when dealt a bad hand).

== See also ==
- Forkball
- Telegraphing (entertainment)
