= List of free PC games =

The following is a list of PC games that have been deemed monetarily free by their creator or copyright holder. This includes free-to-play games, even if they include monetized micro transactions.

== List ==
The following list has 27 segments in total, ranging from A to Z, followed by a numerical section.

A - B - C - D - E - F - G - H - I - J - K - L - M - N - O - P - Q - R - S - T - U - V - W - X - Y - Z - Numerical

=== A ===
| Name | Developer | Publisher | Genre(s) | Operating system(s) | Date released | Date free | Free type | Metacritic |
|---|---|---|---|---|---|---|---|---|
| Ahriman's Prophecy | Aveyond Studios | Aveyond Studios | Role playing video game | Microsoft Windows, macOS, Linux | 2004 | 2004 | Freeware | |
| Aion: The Tower of Eternity | NCsoft | NCsoft | MMORPG | Microsoft Windows | KOR: 25 November 2008 | EU: 29 February 2012; US: 11 April 2012 | Free to Play | |
| Allegiance | Microsoft Research | Microsoft | Space simulation, Real-time strategy, Action | Microsoft Windows | March 16, 2000 | 2004 | Freeware | |
| Angband | Angband Development Team | Angband Development Team | Roguelike | Microsoft Windows, macOS | 1990 | 1990 | Free and open-source | |
| Ao Oni | noprops | | Survival horror | Microsoft Windows | November 2008 | November 2008 | Freeware | |
| Apex Legends | Respawn Entertainment | Electronic Arts | Battle royale | Microsoft Windows | February 4, 2019 | February 4, 2019 | Free to Play | |
| APB Reloaded | Reloaded Productions | Gamersfirst | Action, MMO | Microsoft Windows | December 6, 2011 | | Free to Play | |
| ArcheAge | XL Games | Tencent Games (China); Trion Worlds (NA, Europe, Australia, NZ); Mail.ru (Russia) | MMORPG | Microsoft Windows | KOR: 15 January 2013; JP: 23 July 2013; RUS: Open beta; EU: 16 September 2014; US: 16 September 2014 | | Free to Play | |
| Armagetron Advanced | Armagetron Advanced Team | Armagetron Advanced Team | Snake game | Microsoft Windows, macOS, Linux, AmigaOS 4, OpenBSD | 2001 | 2001 | Free and open-source software | |
| Asphalt | Gameloft | Gameloft | Racing Game | Microsoft Windows, iOS, iPadOS, MacOS, Android, Steam, Xbox,… | 2005 | 2005 | Free-to-play | |
| The Elder Scrolls: Arena | Bethesda Softworks | Bethesda Softworks | RPG | DOS | 1994 | 2004 | Freeware | 80 |

=== B ===
| Name | Developer | Publisher | Genre(s) | Operating system(s) | Date released | Date free | Free type | Metacritic |
|---|---|---|---|---|---|---|---|---|
| Barkley, Shut Up and Jam: Gaiden | Tales of Game's Studios | Tales of Game's Studios | RPG | Microsoft Windows, macOS | January 22, 2008 | | Freeware | 93 |
| The Battle for Wesnoth | David White and others | David White and others | Turn-based strategy | Microsoft Windows, macOS, Linux | October 2005 | October 2005 | Freeware | 91 |
| Beneath a Steel Sky | Revolution Software | Virgin Interactive Entertainment | Adventure game | MS-DOS, Amiga, Amiga CD32 | March 1994 | August 2003 | Freeware | |
| Blacklight: Retribution | Zombie, Inc. | Perfect World Entertainment | Action | Playstation 4 | July 22, 2012 | | Free to Play | |
| Black Mesa | Crowbar Collective | Crowbar Collective | First-person shooter | Microsoft Windows, Linux | September 14, 2012 | September 14, 2012 | | 86 |
| Brawlhalla | Blue Mammoth Games | Ubisoft | Fighting | Microsoft Windows, macOS | October 17, 2017 | | Free to Play | |

=== C ===
| Name | Developer | Publisher | Genre(s) | Operating system(s) | Date released | Date free | Free type | Metacritic |
|---|---|---|---|---|---|---|---|---|
| Call of Duty: Warzone | Infinity Ward, Raven Software | Activision | Battle royale | Microsoft Windows | March 10, 2020 | March 10, 2020 | Free to Play | |
| Card Hunter | Blue Manchu | Blue Manchu | Card Game, Turn-based strategy | Web browser, Microsoft Windows, macOS | | | | |
| Cart Life | | | | | | | | |
| Castle of the Winds | | | | | | | | |
| Cataclysm: Dark Days Ahead | | | | | | | | |
| Cave Story | Daisuke "Pixel" Amaya | Daisuke "Pixel" Amaya | Metroidvania | Microsoft Windows | | | | |
| Command & Conquer: Tiberian Sun | Westwood Studios | Electronic Arts | Real-time strategy | Microsoft Windows | August 27, 1999 | February 12, 2010 | Freeware | |
| Counter-Strike 2 | Valve | Valve | First-person shooter | Microsoft Windows, Linux | September 27, 2023 | September 27, 2023 | Free to Play | |
| Crusader Kings II | Paradox Development Studio | Paradox Interactive | Grand strategy, role-playing | Microsoft Windows, Linux, macOS | February 14, 2012 | October 18, 2019 | Free to play | |

=== D ===
| Name | Developer | Publisher | Genre(s) | Operating system(s) | Date released | Date free | Free type | Metacritic |
|---|---|---|---|---|---|---|---|---|
| DC Universe Online | Daybreak Game Company | WB Games | MMORPG | Microsoft Windows | January 11, 2011 | November 1, 2011 | Free to Play | |
| A Date with Death | Two and a Half Studios | Two and a Half Studios | Visual novel | Microsoft Windows, MacOS, Linux | December 7, 2023 | December 7, 2023 | Freeware | |
| Death Rally | Remedy | Apogee Software, Ltd. | Vehicular combat, Racing | MS-DOS, Microsoft Windows | 7 September 1996 | 20 October 2009 | Freeware | |
| Destiny 2 | Bungie | Bungie | First-person shooter | Microsoft Windows | October 24, 2017 | October 1, 2019 | Free to Play | |
| Digital Combat Simulator | Eagle Dynamics | The Fighter Collection | Combat flight simulation game | Microsoft Windows | 17 October 2008 | 17 October 2008 | | |
| Digital: A Love Story | Love Conquers All Games | Love Conquers All Games | Visual novel | Microsoft Windows, Mac OS X, Linux | February 2010 | February 2010 | | |
| Dink Smallwood | Robinson Technologies | Iridon Interactive | Role-playing | Microsoft Windows | 1998 | October 17, 1999 | Freeware | |
| Doki Doki Literature Club! | Team Salvato | Team Salvato | Visual novel | Microsoft Windows, OS X, Linux | September 22, 2017 | September 22, 2017 | Freeware | 78 |
| Don't Take It Personally, Babe, It Just Ain't Your Story | | | | | | | | |
| Dota 2 | Valve | Valve | MOBA | Microsoft Windows, OS X, Linux | July 2013 | July 2013 | Free-to-play | 90 |
| Dragonsphere | | | | | | | | |
| Dungeon Crawl Stone Soup | | | | | | | | |
| Dwarf Fortress | Tarn Adams | Bay 12 Games | City-building game, Roguelike | Windows, OS X, Linux | August 2006 | August 2006 | Freeware | |

=== E ===
| Name | Developer | Publisher | Genre(s) | Operating system(s) | Date released | Date free | Free type | Metacritic |
|---|---|---|---|---|---|---|---|---|
| Egoboo | | | | | | | | |
| The Elder Scrolls: Daggerfall | Bethesda Softworks | Bethesda Softworks | RPG | DOS | September 20, 1996 | August 31, 1996 | Freeware | |
| Elona | | | | | | | | |
| Elsword | KOG | KOG | MMORPG | Microsoft Windows | December 27, 2007 | December 27, 2007 | Free To Play | |
| Eve Online | CCP Games | Simon & Schuster | MMORPG | Microsoft Windows | May 6, 2003 | November 11, 2016 | Limited Free To Play | |
| EverQuest II | Sony Online Entertainment, LLC | Sony Online Entertainment, LLC | MMORPG | Microsoft Windows | December 7, 2011 | December 7, 2011 | Free to Play | |

=== F ===
| Name | Developer | Publisher | Genre(s) | Operating system(s) | Date released | Date free | Free type | Metacritic |
|---|---|---|---|---|---|---|---|---|
| Fallen London | | | | | | | | |
| Façade | | | | | | | | |
| Fistful of Frags | Fistful of Frags Team | Fistful of Frags Team | FPS, Indie | Microsoft Windows, macOS, Linux | 9 May 2014 | 9 May 2014 | Free to play | 79 |
| Fortnite: Battle Royale | Epic Games | Epic Games | Battle royale game | Microsoft Windows, macOS | March, 2017 | March, 2017 | Free to Play | 81 |
| FreeCiv | | | | | | | | |
| FreeCol | | | | | | | | |
| FreeOrion | | | | | | | | |
| FreeSpace 2 | Volition | Interplay Entertainment | Space combat simulator | Microsoft Windows, Linux | September, 1999 | April, 2002 | Source code only | 91 |
| Frets on Fire | | | | | | | | None |
| Frog Fractions | | | | | | | | None |
| FS One 2022 | Michael Selig | InertiaSoft | Radio Control Flight Simulator | Microsoft Windows | 2003 | September 6, 2022 | Free, including updates | |

=== G ===
| Name | Developer | Publisher | Genre(s) | Operating system(s) | Date released | Date free | Free type | Metacritic |
|---|---|---|---|---|---|---|---|---|
| Gotham City Impostors | Monolith Productions, Inc. | Warner Bros. Interactive Entertainment | Action, first-person shooter | Microsoft Windows | August 30, 2012 | August 30, 2012 | Free to Play | |
| Gravity Bone | | | | | | | | |
| Guild Wars 2 | ArenaNet | NCSOFT | MMORPG | Microsoft Windows, Mac OS X | August 28, 2012 | August 29, 2015 | Free to Play | |
| Genshin Impact | miHoYo | miHoYo | Action Role-playing game (RPG) | Microsoft Windows | September 28, 2020 | September 28, 2020 | gacha game | 84 |

=== H ===
| Name | Developer | Publisher | Genre(s) | Operating system(s) | Date released | Date free | Free type | Metacritic |
|---|---|---|---|---|---|---|---|---|
| Happy Wars | | | | | | | | |
| Hearthstone | Blizzard Entertainment | Blizzard Entertainment | Digital collectible card game | Microsoft Windows, OS X | 11 March 2014 | Mar 11, 2014 | Free to Play | |
| Heroes and Generals | Reto-Moto | Reto-Moto | MMOFPS | Microsoft Windows | July 11, 2014 | July 11, 2014 | Free to Play | |
| Heroes of Newerth | S2 Games | Frostburn Studios | MOBA | Microsoft Windows | May 12, 2010 | July 29, 2011 | Free to Play | |
| Heroes of the Storm | Blizzard Entertainment | Blizzard Entertainment | MOBA | Microsoft Windows | June 2, 2015 | June 2, 2015 | Free to Play | |
| Heroine's Quest | | | | | | | | |
| Hidden and Dangerous | | | | | | | | |

=== I ===
| Name | Developer | Publisher | Genre(s) | Operating system(s) | Date released | Date free | Free type | Metacritic |
|---|---|---|---|---|---|---|---|---|
| Ib | | | | | | | | |
| Iji | | | | | | | | |
| I Wanna Be the Guy | | | | | | | | |

=== J ===
| Name | Developer | Publisher | Genre(s) | Operating system(s) | Date released | Date free | Free type | Metacritic |

=== K ===
| Name | Developer | Publisher | Genre(s) | Operating system(s) | Date released | Date free | Free type | Metacritic |
|---|---|---|---|---|---|---|---|---|
| Katawa Shoujo | | | | | | | | |
| King's Quest 1 | | | | | | | | |
| King's Quest 2 | | | | | | | | |
| King's Quest 3 | | | | | | | | |

=== L ===
| Name | Developer | Publisher | Genre(s) | Operating system(s) | Date released | Date free | Free type | Metacritic |
|---|---|---|---|---|---|---|---|---|
| League of Legends | Riot Games | Riot Games | MOBA | Microsoft Windows, OS X | October 27, 2009 | October 27, 2009 | Free to Play | |
| Legends of Runeterra | Riot Games | Riot Games | Digital collectible card game | Microsoft Windows | April 29, 2020 | April 29, 2020 | Free to Play | |
| Little Fighter 2 | | | | | | | | |
| Loadout | Edge of Reality | Edge of Reality | Action | Microsoft Windows | January 31, 2014 | January 31, 2014 | Free to Play | |
| The Lord of the Rings Online | Standing Stone Games | Daybreak Game Company | MMORPG | Microsoft Windows | April 24, 2007 | 2010 | Free to Play | |

=== M ===
| Name | Developer | Publisher | Genre(s) | Operating system(s) | Date released | Date free | Free type | Metacritic |
|---|---|---|---|---|---|---|---|---|
| Maldita Castilla | | | | | | | | |
| The Marathon Trilogy | | | | | | | | |
| Mari0 | | | | | | | | |
| Marvel Heroes 2015 | Gazzillion Entertainment | Gazzillion Entertainment | Action, MMO | Microsoft Windows, OS X | June 4, 2013 | June 4, 2013 | Free to Play | |
| Marvel Rivals | NetEase Games | NetEase Games | Hero shooter | Microsoft Windows | | | | |
| Moonbase Alpha | Virtual Heroes, Army Game Studio | NASA | Strategy, Simulation | Microsoft Windows | July 6. 2010 | July 6, 2010 | Free to Play | |
| M.U.G.E.N. | Elecbyte | Elecbyte | Fighting | Linux, MS-DOS, Microsoft Windows, OS X | July 7. 1999 | July 7, 1999 | Freeware | |

=== N ===
| Name | Developer | Publisher | Genre(s) | Operating system(s) | Date released | Date free | Free type | Metacritic |
|---|---|---|---|---|---|---|---|---|
| N | Metanet Software | Metanet Software | Platformer | | | | | |
| Neverball | | | | | | | | None |
| Neverwinter | Cryptic Studios | Perfect World Entertainment | Action, Adventure, MMORPG | Microsoft Windows | December 5, 2013 | December 5, 2013 | Free to Play | 74 |
| Nexuiz | | | | Microsoft Windows, OS X, Linux | December 6, 2024 | December 6, 2024 | Free to Play | |
| No More Room In Hell | No More Room in Hell Team | Lever Games | First-person shooter | Microsoft Windows, OS X, iOS | 31 October 2011 | 31 October 2011 | Free to Play | 63 |

=== O ===
| Name | Developer | Publisher | Genre(s) | Operating System(s) | Date Released | Date Free | Free Type | Metacritic |
|---|---|---|---|---|---|---|---|---|
| Octodad | | | | | | | | |
| OFF | | | | | | | | |
| OpenArena | | | First-person shooter | Microsoft Windows, Linux, OS X | | | Freeware | |
| Open Rails (based on Microsoft Train Simulator) | | | Train simulator | Microsoft Windows | 2009 | 2009 | | |
| OpenTTD | OpenTTD Team | OpenTTD Team | Business simulation game | BSD, Microsoft Windows, Linux, OS X | April 2014 | April 2014 | | 81 |
| osu! | Dean "peppy" Herbert | Dean "peppy" Herbert | Rhythm game | OS X, Microsoft Windows | September 16, 2007 | September 16, 2007 | | |

=== P ===
| Name | Developer | Publisher | Genre(s) | Operating system(s) | Date released | Date free | Free type | Metacritic |
|---|---|---|---|---|---|---|---|---|
| Paladins | Evil Mojo Games | Hi-Rez Studios | First-person shooter | Microsoft Windows | May 8, 2018 | May 8, 2018 | Free to Play | 83 |
| Passage | | | | | | | | None |
| Path of Exile | Grinding Gear Games | Grinding Gear Games | Action, Adventure, RPG | Microsoft Windows | October 23, 2013 | October 23, 2013 | Free to Play | 86 |
| Peggle Extreme | Popcap Games, Inc. | Popcap Games, Inc. | Casual | Microsoft Windows | September 11, 2007 | | | None |
| Perspective | | | | | | | | |
| Planeshift | | | | | | | | None |
| PlanetSide 2 | Sony Online Entertainment | Sony Online Entertainment | MMOFPS | Microsoft Windows | 2012 | 2012 | Free to Play | 84 |
| The Powder Toy | | | | | | | | |
| Prismata | Lunarch Studios | | Turn-based Strategy | Browser-based | | | Free to play | None |

=== Q ===
| Name | Developer | Publisher | Genre(s) | Operating system(s) | Date released | Date free | Free type | Metacritic |
|---|---|---|---|---|---|---|---|---|
| Quest for Glory II | AGD Interactive | | | | | | | 91 |

=== R ===
| Name | Developer | Publisher | Genre(s) | Operating system(s) | Date released | Date free | Free type | Metacritic |
|---|---|---|---|---|---|---|---|---|
| Realm of the Mad God | Wild Shadow Studios | Kabam | Action, MMORPG | Microsoft Windows, OS X | February 20, 2012 | February 20, 2012 | Free to Play | 82 |
| Renegade X (C&C Renegade Fan-Remake) | Totem Arts | Totem Arts | First-person shooter, Third-person shooter | Microsoft Windows | February 25, 2014(beta) | February 25, 2014(beta) | Free | |
| Reprisal | | | | | | | | 84 |
| RIFT | | | | | | | | |
| Robocraft | Freejam | Freejam | Vehicular combat game | Microsoft Windows, OS X, Linux | July 8, 2014 | July 8, 2014 | Free to Play | |
| RuneScape | Jagex Game Studio | Jagex Game Studio | Massively Multiplayer, Fantasy | Java, HTML5 (beta) | 2001 | 2001 | Free to Play | |

=== S ===
| Name | Developer | Publisher | Genre(s) | Operating system(s) | Date released | Date free | Free type | Metacritic |
|---|---|---|---|---|---|---|---|---|
| Scorched 3D | | | | | | | | |
| SCP | | | | | | | | |
| SCP: Secret Laboratory | Northwood Studios | Northwood Studios | Survival horror | Microsoft Windows | 2017 | 2017 | Free to Play | |
| Silkroad Online | Joymax | Joymax, Yahoo! Korea | MMORPG | Microsoft Windows | 2004 | 2004 | Free to Play | |
| The Silver Lining | | | | | | | | |
| Slender: The Eight Pages | Parsec Productions | Parsec Productions | Survival horror | Microsoft Windows, OS X | June 26, 2012 | June 26, 2012 | Free to Play | |
| Smite | Titan Forge Game | Hi-Rez Studios | MOBA | Microsoft Windows | March 25, 2014 | March 25, 2014 | Free to Play | 83 |
| Space Engine | | | | | | | | |
| Space Station 13 | | | | | | | | |
| Spelunky | | | | | | | | |
| Spiral Knights | | | | | | | | |
| StarCraft | Blizzard Entertainment | Blizzard Entertainment | Real-time strategy | Microsoft Windows | March 31, 1998 | April, 2017 | Freeware | 88 |
| Starmade | | | | | | | | |
| Star Trek Online | | | | | | | | |
| Street Fighter X Mega Man | | | | | | | | |
| Stronghold Kingdoms | | | | | | | | |
| Super Crate Box | Vlambeer | Vlambeer | Action | Microsoft Windows | August 29, 2012 | August 29, 2012 | Free to Play | |
| Super Mario Bros. Crossover | | | | | | | Free to Play | |
| Super Smash Land | | | | | | | | |
| System Shock | | | | | | | | |

=== T ===
| Name | Developer | Publisher | Genre(s) | Operating system(s) | Date released | Date free | Free type | Metacritic |
|---|---|---|---|---|---|---|---|---|
| Tactical Intervention | | | | | | | | |
| TagPro | Nick Riggs (LuckySpammer) | Nick Riggs (LuckySpammer) | MOBA | Microsoft Windows, OS X, Linux | June 2013 | June 2013 | Free-to-play | |
| Tales of Maj'Eyal | | | | | | | | |
| Team Fortress 2 | Valve | Valve | First-person shooter | Microsoft Windows, OS X, Linux | 10 October 2007 | 23 June 2011 | Free-to-play | |
| Tecmo Bowl | | | | | | | | |
| Tetr.io | Osk | | Puzzle/Stacker | Microsoft Windows, OS X, Linux, Web | 2019 | | Free-to-play | |
| theHunter | | | | | | | | |
| Tom Clancy's Ghost Recon Phantoms | | | | | | | | |
| Torcs | | | | | | | | |
| Toribash | Nabi Studios | Nicalis, Inc | Action, Strategy | Microsoft Windows, OS X, Linux | March 1, 2006 | March 1, 2006 | Free to Play | |
| TrackMania Nations Forever | Nadeo | Focus Interactive | Racing video game | Microsoft Windows | April 16, 2008 | April 16, 2008 | Free-to-Play | |
| Transcendence | | | | | | | | |
| Transformice | Atelier 801 | Atelier 801 | MMO, Platform | Microsoft Windows, macOS, Linux | May 1, 2010 | May 1, 2010 | Free-to-play | |
| Tribes: Ascend | | | | | | | | |
| Tyrian 2000 | | | | | | | | |

=== U ===
| Name | Developer | Publisher | Genre(s) | Operating system(s) | Date released | Date free | Free type | Metacritic |
|---|---|---|---|---|---|---|---|---|
| Ultima 4 | Origin Systems | Electronic Arts | RPG | DOS, Microsoft Windows | 1985 | | Freeware | |
| Unknown Horizons | | | | | | | | |
| Unreal Tournament | Epic Games | | FPS | Microsoft Windows, OS X, Linux | TBA | | | |
| UnReal World | | | | | | | | |
| Unturned | Nelson Sexton | Smartly Dressed Games | Action, Adventure, Casual | Microsoft Windows, OS X | July 7, 2017 | July 7, 2017 | Free to Play | |
| Urban Terror | FrozenSand | FrozenSand | FPS | Microsoft Windows, OS X, Linux | August 5, 2000 (Beta 1.0), Jan 25 2014 (4.2.018) | August 5, 2000 | | |

=== V ===
| Name | Developer | Publisher | Genre(s) | Operating system(s) | Date released | Date free | Free type | Metacritic |
|---|---|---|---|---|---|---|---|---|
| Valorant | Riot Games | Riot Games | First-person shooter | Microsoft Windows | June 2, 2020 | June 2, 2020 | Free to Play | |
| VDrift | | | | | | | | |
| Vindictus | Nexon | Nexon America Inc. | Action | Microsoft Windows | June 22, 2012 | | Free to Play. | |

=== W ===
| Name | Developer | Publisher | Genre(s) | Operating system(s) | Date released | Date free | Free type | Metacritic |
|---|---|---|---|---|---|---|---|---|
| Warface | Crytek | Crytek | Action | Microsoft Windows | July 1, 2014 | July 1, 2014 | Free to Play | |
| War Thunder | Gaijin Entertainment | Gaijin Entertainment | Simulation | Microsoft Windows, OS X | November 1, 2012 (Open Beta) | | Free to Play | |
| Warframe | Digital Extremes | Digital Extremes | Action | Microsoft Windows | March 15, 2013 | | Free to Play | |
| Warzone 2100 | Warzone 2100 Project | Warzone 2100 Project | Real-time strategy | Microsoft Windows, macOS, Linux, FreeBSD, OpenBSD | 1999 (Original retail release) | June 11, 2005 (Open-source release) | Free and open-source | |
| Within a Deep Forest | | | | | | | | |
| World Golf Tour | | | | | | | | |
| World of Tanks | Wargaming | Wargaming | Simulation | Microsoft Windows | March 2011 | | Free to Play | |
| World of Warplanes | Wargaming | Wargaming | Simulation | Microsoft Windows | November 2013 | | Free to Play | |
| World of Warships | Wargaming | Wargaming | Simulation | Microsoft Windows | September 17, 2015 | | Free to Play | |
| Worlds of Ultima: The Savage Empire | Origin Systems | Origin Systems, Pony Canyon | RPG | DOS, Microsoft Windows, NES | 1990 | June 18, 2012 | Freeware | |

=== X ===
| Name | Developer | Publisher | Genre(s) | Operating system(s) | Date released | Date free | Free type | Metacritic |
|---|---|---|---|---|---|---|---|---|
| X-Moto | | | | | | | | |
| Xonotic | | | First-person shooter | Windows, Mac, Linux | | | FOSS | 89 |

=== Y ===
| Name | Developer | Publisher | Genre(s) | Operating system(s) | Date released | Date free | Free type | Metacritic |
|---|---|---|---|---|---|---|---|---|
| Yume Nikki | | | | | | | | |

=== Z ===
| Name | Developer | Publisher | Genre(s) | Operating system(s) | Date released | Date free | Free type | Metacritic |
|---|---|---|---|---|---|---|---|---|
| Zero-K | | | | | | | | |

=== Numerical ===
| Name | Developer | Publisher | Genre(s) | Operating system(s) | Date released | Date free | Free type | Metacritic |
|---|---|---|---|---|---|---|---|---|
| 0 A.D. | | | | | | | | |

== See also ==
- List of open-source video games
- List of commercial video games with available source code
- List of PC games
- List of freeware
- List of freeware video games
- Lists of video games
