= Speed Dreams =

2010 racing video game

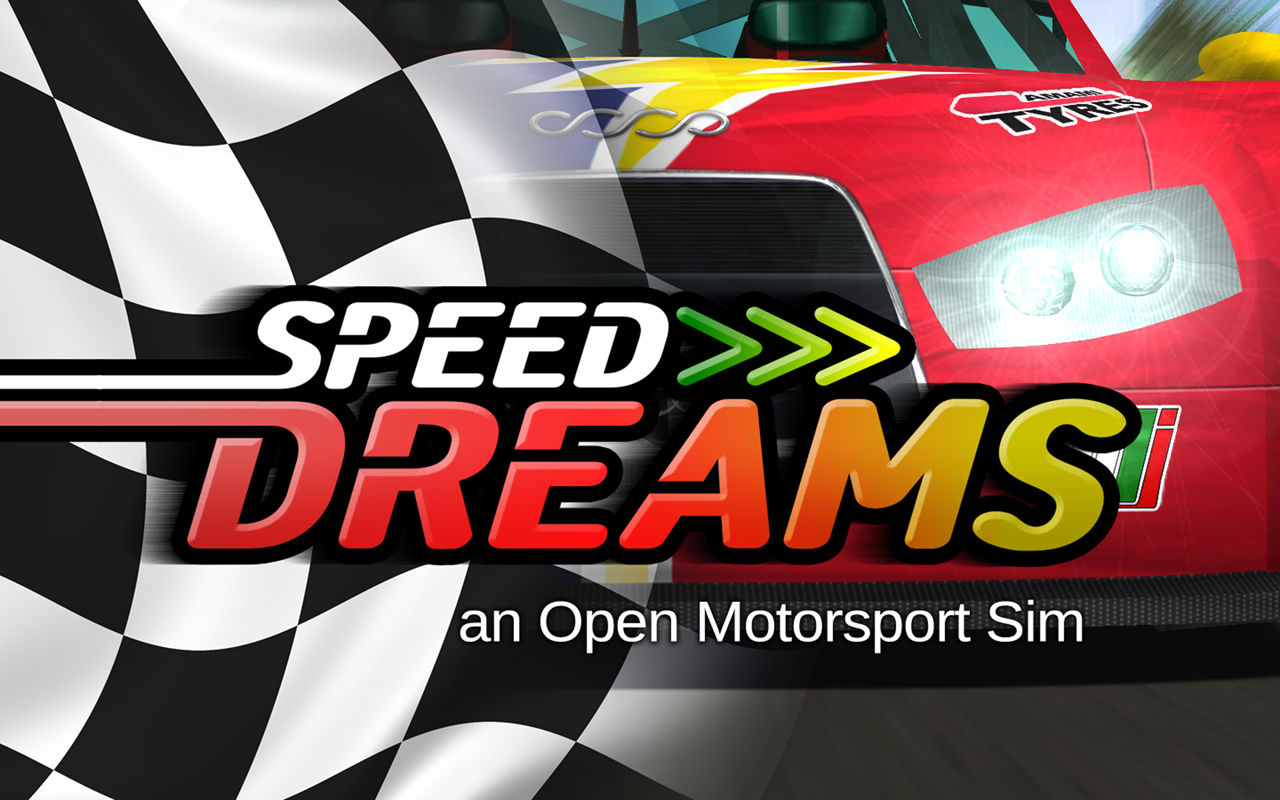
- Developer: The Speed Dreams Team
- Release: 27 March 2010; 16 years ago
- Stable release: 2.4.0 / 3 February 2025; 21 months ago
- Written in: C++, C, XML
- Operating system: Linux, Microsoft Windows, AmigaOS 4, AROS, MorphOS, Haiku
- Size: 120 MB
- Available in: English
- Type: Racing simulation
- License: GNU General Public License (code), Free Art License (artwork)
- Website: www.speed-dreams.net
- Repository: forge.a-lec.org/speed-dreams

Speed Dreams, is a free and open source 3D racing video game for Linux, Microsoft Windows, AmigaOS 4, AROS, MorphOS and Haiku. Started in 2008 as a fork of the racing car simulator TORCS, it is mainly written in C++ and released under GPL v2+ and Free Art License, the most recent release being version 2.4.2 as of September 2025.

The development of an accurate driving behavior, with different physics engines available, sets the project among the few open source racing simulation codebases. (Note: Considering that: Speed Dreams was forked from TORCS, which in turn was based on RARS.; Arcade racing is a different genre from sim racing, the only other actively developed open source codebases are those of VDrift and of Trigger, the latter being limited to rally racing.)

Speed Dreams can be played with a variety of input devices, including keyboards, mouses, joypads, joysticks, racing wheels and pedals.

== Gameplay ==
=== Racing modes ===
Speed Dreams features several different racing modes; while some offer greater customization than others, most generally try to reproduce real types of races. Complex events, such as various categories of championships or endurance races, are also available. Because racing modes are defined by plain-text configuration files, custom ones can be freely created. In this context the most relevant change since TORCS − introduced in Speed Dreams 2.0 − is the "Career" mode: here the player can compete with different car classes, during multiple seasons, on randomly selected tracks and against balanced random opponents, earning points in championship rankings. Within practice mode, since version 1.4.0, it is possible to run robot races in the "results-only" mode, that is, ignoring the graphics display of the race; this allows the simulation to be run at a speed limited only by the computing power available, and is mostly used by robot developers. For the same purpose version 2.0 provides also a text-only mode: the race is run without graphics − no hardware acceleration being required − and the results are displayed through a command-line interface.

Synopsis of racing modes that are officially released in version 2.0
| Name | Cars range | Tracks range | Drivers range | Race length | Qualification session | Multiple race sessions | Time of day | Sky conditions | Rainfall (Note: In all modes, if a race is attended by robots which don't support rainfall, this feature is disabled.) | Results-only mode | Results menu |
|---|---|---|---|---|---|---|---|---|---|---|---|
| Practice | All | All | All, only one at a time | Any | No | No | Custom | Custom | Custom | Yes (robot drivers only) | Complete lap-by-lap information |
| Quick race | All | All | All, up to 40 at a time | Any | No | No | Custom | Custom | Custom | No | Driver-by-driver information |
| Single event – Endurance | All | All | All, up to 50 at a time | Fixed: 500 km | Yes, customizable length | No | Custom | Custom | Custom | No | Driver-by-driver information |
| Single event – Challenge | All | All | All, up to 50 at a time | Fixed: 50 km (sprint), 180 km (main race) | Yes, customizable length | Two races: sprint and main race | Custom | Custom | Custom | No | Driver-by-driver information |
| Single event – Category-specific challenge | All cars within the given category (MP5, 36 GP or LS-GT1) | All | All drivers within the given car category | Any | Yes, customizable length | Depending on category chosen | Fixed | Custom | Custom | No | Driver-by-driver information |
| Championship – All classes | All | Fixed | All, up to 50 at a time | Fixed | Yes, fixed length (3 laps) | Yes, multiple race days on different tracks | Custom | Custom | Custom | No | Driver-by-driver information |
| Championship – category-specific | All cars within the given category (Supercars, TRB1, MP5, 36GP, LS-GT1) | Fixed | All drivers within the given car category | Custom | Yes, customizable length | Yes, multiple race days on different tracks | Custom | Custom | Custom | No | Driver-by-driver information |
| Career | Automatic choice | Automatic choice | Automatic choice of robots driving all cars from the same category as player's | Fixed | Yes, fixed length (3 laps) | Yes, multiple race days on different tracks and with different car categories | Custom | Custom | Custom | Possibility to skip practice sessions; forced results-only mode for AI robots' qualifications | Driver-by-driver information |

=== Weather ===
Speed Dreams 2.0 introduced the simulation of a real sky dome, along with customizable weather conditions: the user can choose the time of day, the cloud cover and the intensity of rainfall to have during the race. The sky dome can be set up as dynamic, namely simulating the succession of day and night and the movement of celestial bodies. Weather simulation affects both physics, with proper corrections to the cars' adherence, and graphics, with animated cloud layers, and if necessary a 2D overlay of rain particles.

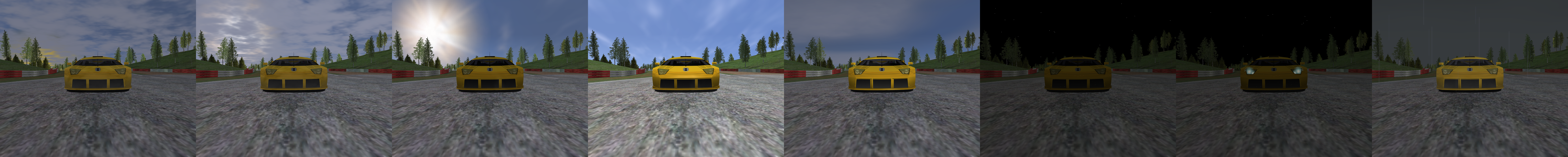
From left to right: cloudy dawn, cloudy morning, clear morning, clear noon, partly cloudy dusk, clear night, clear night with headlamps, rainy afternoon.

=== Physics ===
Speed Dreams can load different physics engines to use during races. Written in C++, they are software modules executed at every simulation frame to compute the cars' parameters such as position, speed, damage, collisions, suspensions. The user is able to select the physics engine before every race; currently available are:

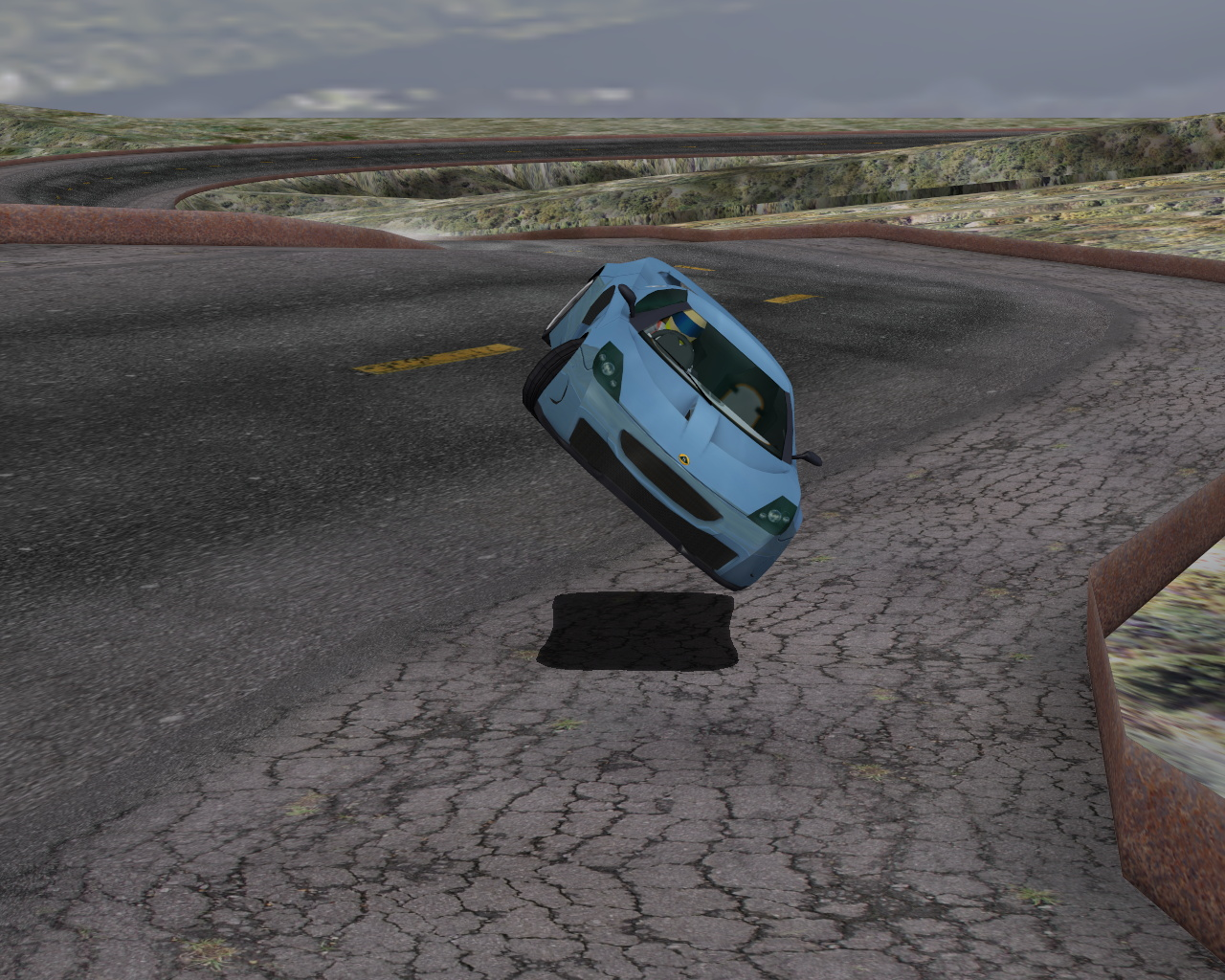
Driving at excessive speed on banked chicanes may result in car rolling under SimuV3.

| Name | Description |
|---|---|
| SimuV2 | The original TORCS pseudo-3D physics (Note: A "Pseudo-3D" engine projects the car's physics on a plane: Cars have a limited banking/pitch angle.; Physics are more precise for low values of banking and pitch.) with some backports from SimuV2.1 and SimuV3. |
| SimuV2.1 | New version of SimuV2 with some improvements; it is the official physics engine for Speed Dreams 2.0, upon which cars parameters are set up. |
| SimuV3 | 3D physics engine. |
| SimuV4 | New in release 2.1. |

All Speed Dreams physics engines feature real-time car collisions based on the SOLID library. Each car model defines a bounding box according to which the physics engine detects side and bottom collisions; these produce car damages, computed on a scale ranging from 0 to 10000; damages affect only cars' performances, without producing any graphical output. A car with more than 10000 damage points is excluded from the race.

=== Sound ===
Sound management is achieved through OpenAL or, optionally, PLIB. Audible sounds include collision and tire screeching noise, in addition to the engine's; there are simulated also complex effects such as attenuation and Doppler shift. In 2011, the professional sound production company audioberlin reworked the default Speed Dreams sounds; the improved versions are included in release 2.0.0.

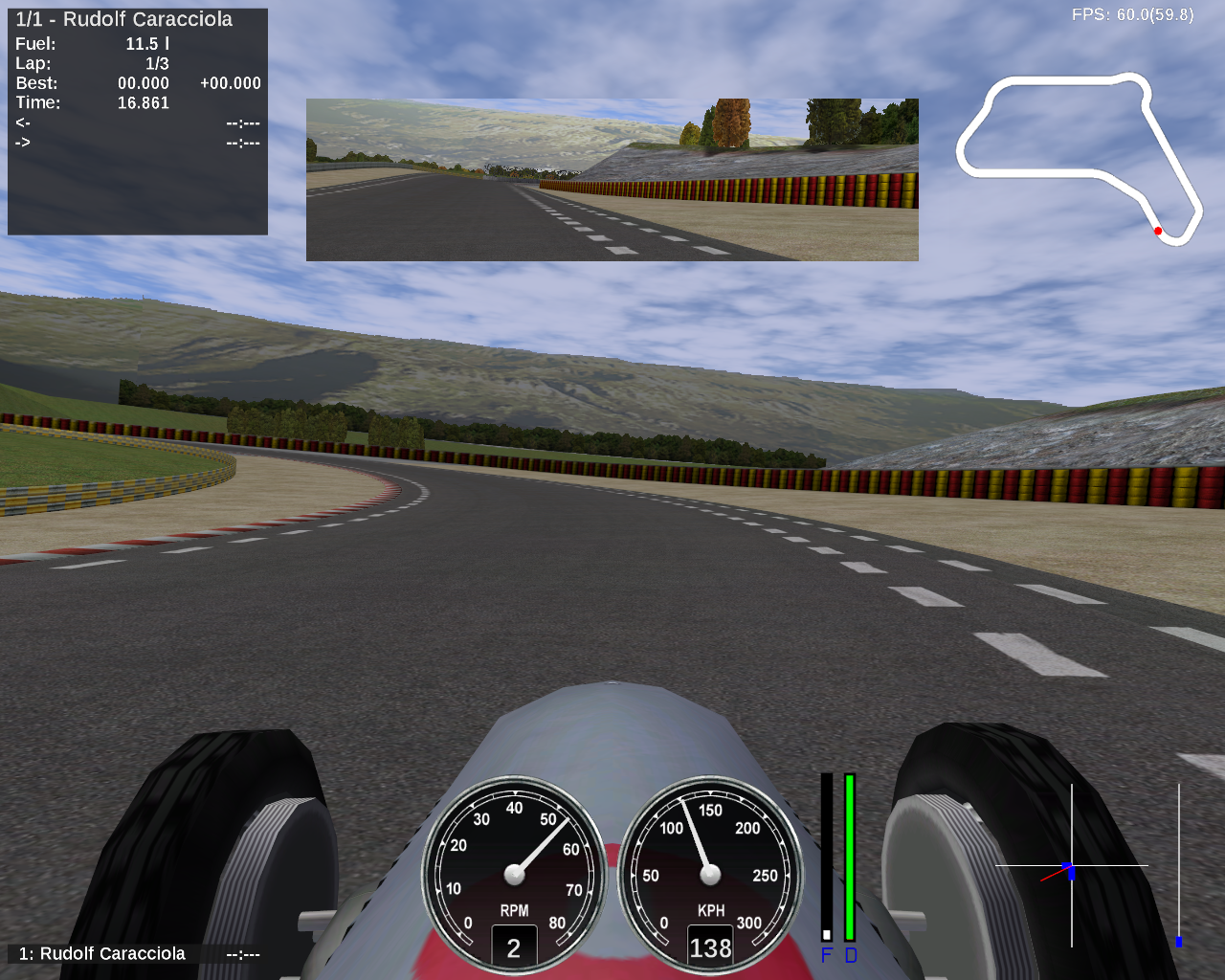
The racing interface with default layout and modes. Clockwise from top left corner: driver board, rear mirror, FPS counter, mini-map, clutch conditions graph, G-forces graph, damage bar, fuel bar, speedometer, tachometer, leaders board.

=== Racing interfaces ===
While racing, the player is offered a customizable 2D cockpit displaying various gauges, lap times information and a dynamic mini-map. Every instrument features several modes, among which the player can choose while racing in order to change the appearance, or even completely hide the interface. A rear mirror is also available, although quite expensive in terms of consumed computing power. An "arcade" mode, legacy of TORCS, is still maintained as of version 2.0; according to the authors of the Italian manual for TORCS, it is more suitable for the novice player of Speed Dreams. New addition to Speed Dreams is the Formula One-style timer with an accuracy of a millisecond (ten times more precise than TORCS' one).

=== AI ===
TORCS was born with focus set more on AI racing than on human driving. Speed Dreams, according to the project's description, shifted the balance towards a more user-oriented racing experience. Nonetheless, unlike the fate of the other legacy content, reworked but mostly maintained, in late 2009 all the robot engines inherited from TORCS were removed and replaced by new, more advanced ones.

==== General description ====
Speed Dreams features computer-controlled opponents to race against, commonly called "robots". These are software modules, written in C++, which control the behaviour of cars during any kind of practice, qualification or race session. A module can virtually handle any number of single robot drivers; these share the source code but may have custom car setups and liveries, and even drive different cars. Robots may be programmed with any kind of function in order to compute racing variables: throttle, brake, steer, gearbox and clutch. These values are sent to the race engine by an open interface of Speed Dreams. Human players are treated just like any other robot: their variables are controlled by user-defined input devices and can be influenced by automated driving aids such as ABS, TCS or speed limiter for pit-stops.

==== Available robots ====
Speed Dreams 2.0 features 3 official robot engines, for a grand total of about 150 drivers competing in all the official car categories:

| Name | Description | Author |
|---|---|---|
| Simplix | Described as "cautious and not too aggressive", Simplix robots won the 2008 and 2009 seasons of the TORCS world endurance championship. As of 2.0.0 release, it is the only robot engine able to drive on different weather conditions. | Wolf-Dieter Beelitz |
| USR | Based on K1999 racing line computation algorithm, USR robots won the 2007 season of the TORCS world endurance championship. USR driving style is described as "aggressive and very entertaining" by the Speed Dreams development team. | Andrew Sumner |
| kilo2008 | Based on a heavily modified version of the "Locus" robot tutorial by Andrew Sumner, kilo2008 attended the 2008 and 2009 seasons of the TORCS world endurance championship. | Gábor Kmetyko |

Another different set of drivers include dandriod and shadow.

Robots from the 1936 GP car series are named after real drivers of that period; the names of most other robots are fictitious, although many names of Speed Dreams developers and contributors appear, mostly in the Torcs Racing Board 1 category.

==== Common robot functions ====
Robots shipped within Speed Dreams share some kinds of behavioural functions in order to achieve realism in the driving simulation. While being loaded, robots compute a racing line, which depends on the track's XML description. Initial fuel amount, conforming to a fuel and pit-stop strategy, is also estimated and requested to the race engine. During the race robots aim at following the racing line, but their behaviour can be influenced by the parameters received by the race engine; these include the position and the speed of other cars, which is taken into account by collision-avoidance and overtaking algorithms. Robots also have learning capability: they can improve their lap times basing on previously driven laps. A function to regain the track after accidents is also implemented in all official robot engines. Speed Dreams robots can handle a so-called "skilling" parameter, defined by the player: this way the user can alter the robots' performance and therefore their lap times.

=== Pit stops ===
As of release 2.0, the pit stop simulation system remains unchanged from TORCS. When racing on tracks equipped with a pit lane, drivers are assigned a pit stop emplacement according to their position on the starting grid. Since most tracks don't provide enough emplacements for all the race competitors, robot drivers support pit stop sharing. To trigger pit stops, robots have to drive near their emplacement at sufficiently slow speed, then make the stop request to the race engine, which captures the car and keeps it still and unresponsive until the end of the process. The human robot automatically sends the request as soon as the other conditions are satisfied; the simulation is then paused, while the player is offered a menu where he can choose the parameters of the stop. Services offered during pit stops are repairing damage, refuelling and serving penalties; the stop's duration is automatically defined and depends on the amount of damage and of fuel to deal with. During pit stops no graphical animation is displayed.

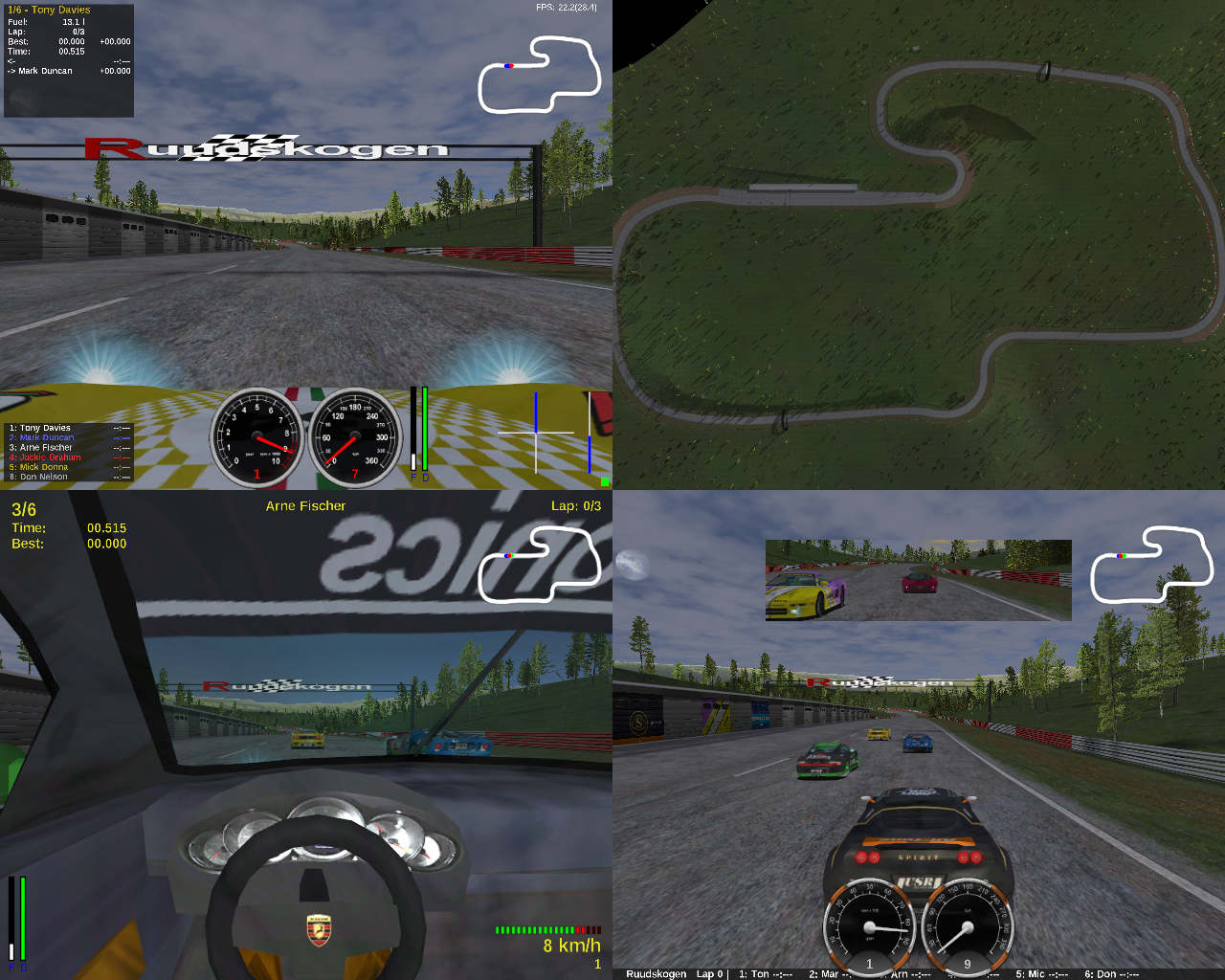
The split-screen feature at work with four regions and default layout. The green square near the centre of the picture identifies the selected region, whose interface, camera mode and focused driver can be currently shifted.

=== Multiplayer ===
The "split-screen" feature allows to split the display − on the same monitor − into up to four regions which act independently: these can show the perspective of different cameras, with different interface settings and following different drivers. During the race the regions can be dynamically created, deleted and arranged in several different layouts. On the human racer's side this system allows up to four players to simultaneously compete in the same race using the same PC.

An on-line multiplayer mode was developed for version 2.0, but wasn't included in the official release because it was not yet fully stable.

=== Penalties ===
Speed Dreams has inherited from TORCS a per-driver penalty system. Penalties are triggered by violations to pit lane rules: breaking the speed limit in the pit lane (90 km/h) results in a drive-through penalty, while crossing the pit lane border produces a stop-and-go penalty.

Penalties have to be cleared within five laps since the notification; disobeying drivers are automatically excluded from the race.

=== Cameras ===
Several different camera modes are available, covering different cockpit and outside views. The "TV director" camera mode makes use of segment-by-segment cameras defined by each track, automatically focusing on interesting events of a race. Each camera mode can be independently zoomed in and out. No free camera is available as of version 2.3.0.

=== Time warping ===
Speed Dreams inherited from TORCS the possibility to accelerate and slow down the simulation; release 2.0 of the project extended this feature so that, while keeping constant the actual duration of the simulated frame, the rendered simulation speed could range from 64 times slower to 16 times faster than default, with increment steps of powers of 2. To achieve such acceleration, more frames have to be rendered within the same actual time: hence the accordingly higher computing power required by this feature. This feature can be used on long straights when the driver is impatient.

== Content ==
The whole artwork shipped since version 1.4.0 is licensed under the Free Art License.

=== File formats ===
Speed Dreams makes an extensive use of plain-text files throughout its content. Used to define settings for cars (about 200 customizable values), tracks, in-game menus, game options and robot engines, XML markup accounts for about 40% of the whole project's code. As for 3D models, there was maintained the .acc format, TORCS evolution of the equally plain-text .ac format from AC3D allowing smoothing and shadow mapping on the model. Although changes to the file formats introduced new features, backward compatibility was preserved: Speed Dreams can load cars, tracks and robots designed for TORCS. The opposite is only partially true, as TORCS can't handle the unknown parameters from Speed Dreams.

=== Cars ===
==== Car features ====
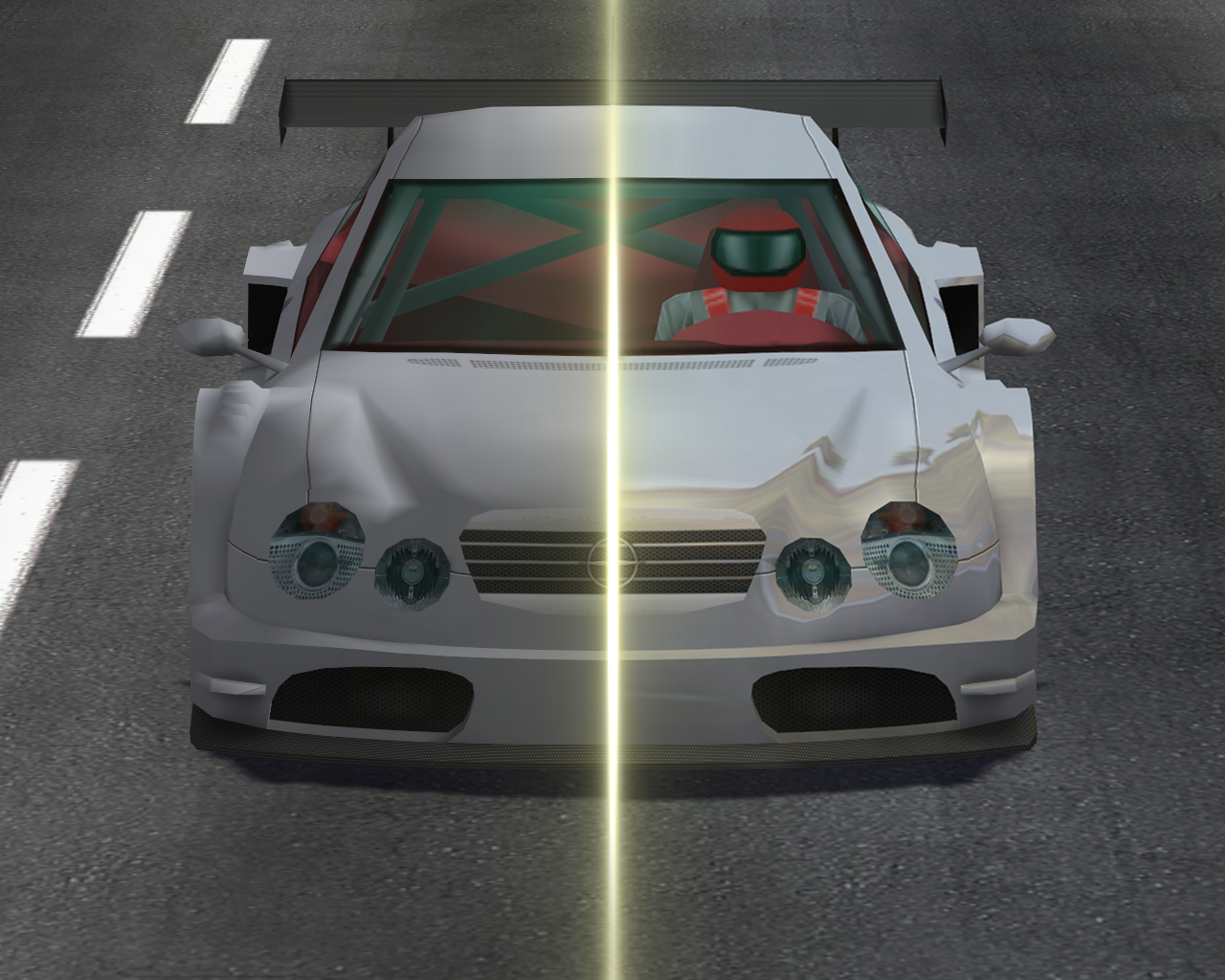
Comparison of the reflections system of TORCS 1.3.3 (left) and Speed Dreams 2.0 (right)

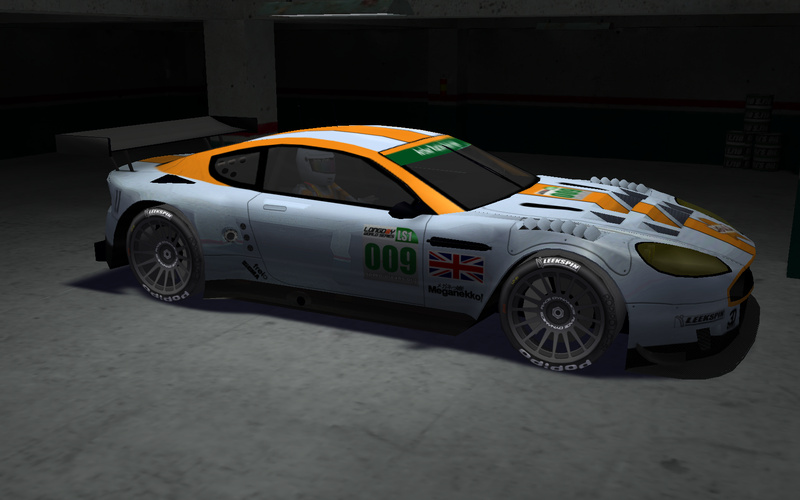
Official preview of the Archer R9 car model with the "Uguu" livery (Speed Dreams 2.0)

Speed Dreams inherited from TORCS the handling of some graphics features such as custom 3D wheels, working lights (front, rear, brake and reverse) and glowing brake disks; new features introduce support for animated drivers and steering wheels, first used on the 1936 Grand Prix class cars, and improved environment mapping for more realistic reflections. As there isn't support for dynamic shading, each car defines a shadow image that is projected under the car's model. Several levels of detail are supported for each car model in order to improve simulation performance, although − for size reasons − the official release ships only one. Since version 2.0 the user is enabled to choose among different liveries for each car, which affect the car's exterior paint, wheels and interior appearance. About 250 liveries, between player and robots skins, are shipped with the 2.0.0 release. A static preview of the car's appearance is displayed during the car's selection: a special "garage" track was created with the purpose of shooting preview images.

==== Available cars ====
Available cars are grouped into categories, usually containing 6 to 8 models of comparable performances and size. Release 2.0 features 44 official cars spread among 6 categories:

| Category name | Description |
|---|---|
| 1936 Grand Prix | Cars from the pre-World War II era of Grand-Prix racing. |
| TORCS Racing Board 1 | Highly modified version of the original TRB1 car set from TORCS. |
| Supercars | A set of six sports cars in their production state, meant to introduce novice drivers into Speed Dreams. |
| Long Day Series GT1 | Top-end sports cars modified for endurance racing, modeled after the real-world GT1 class. |
| Long Day Series GT2 | Other sport cars with less engine power. |
| Monoposto 5 | Loosely based on the British Formula Ford specifications. |
| World Rally Series | Offroad/Rally cars still under development. |

There are 26 more cars under development inside Speed Dreams SVN repository, covering various classes of open wheel racing.

Some models available in Speed Dreams, and especially the content inherited from TORCS, are inspired from the design of existing racing cars; in order to avoid possible legal issues, the names of manufacturers, of brands and of models were replaced by fictional ones before release 1.4.0.

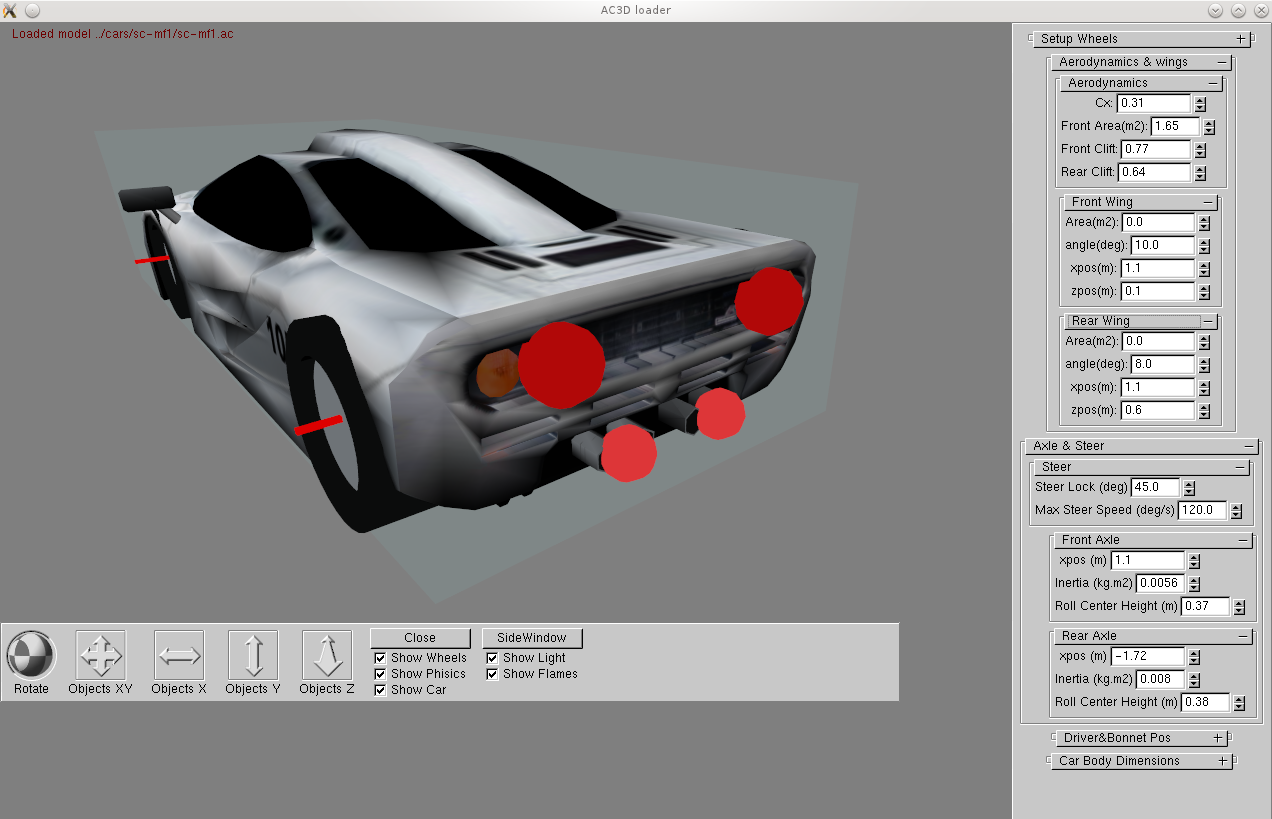
The 3D viewer of TCSE

==== External tools ====
The Torcs Car Setup Editor, generally shortened to TCSE, is a cross-platform program written in C++ by Vicente Martí Centelles. It allows to set up all the car's XML parameters from a graphical interface; it can automatically compute many values, draw different charts of the car's performance and display a 3D dynamic preview of the car's appearance.

=== Tracks ===
Sections and subsegments in a turn: general layout (light blue), main track (black), borders (red), sides (green) and barriers (purple)

==== Track system description ====
A Speed Dreams track is defined as a list of segments: straights and left/right turns. Every segment is divided into four sections: main track, sides, borders and barriers. These sections are customizable in terms of width, graphics, physics behaviour, etc. Track segments are split into more sub-segments in order to get a smoother result on the graphics and on the physics side through interpolation. As a result of this segment-based structure, tracks are limited by left and right boundaries: the physics engine restricts the area where cars can be driven so that no car can actually cross the boundaries, except while being excluded from the race, when it is no more subject to physics. As of release 2.0.0-rc1, Speed Dreams supports only a fixed width value for the "main track" section; variable width is simulated by property tweaks to borders and sides, which instead offer customizable width.

==== Available track categories ====
Traditionally, TORCS tracks had been divided in 3 categories: road, dirt and oval; the Grand Prix Circuits category was newly introduced in Speed Dreams to gather the available race tracks. Release 2.0 of Speed Dreams offers 44 official tracks spread among 4 categories:

| Category name | Description |
|---|---|
| Road tracks | Tracks laid out on fictional public roads, in a wide variety of environments. |
| Speedways | Oval tracks with an asphalt surface. |
| Grand Prix Circuits | Race tracks, both fictional and designed after real tracks layouts, with a rich 3D environment. |
| Dirt tracks | Short and bumpy tracks with dirt or ice surfaces. |

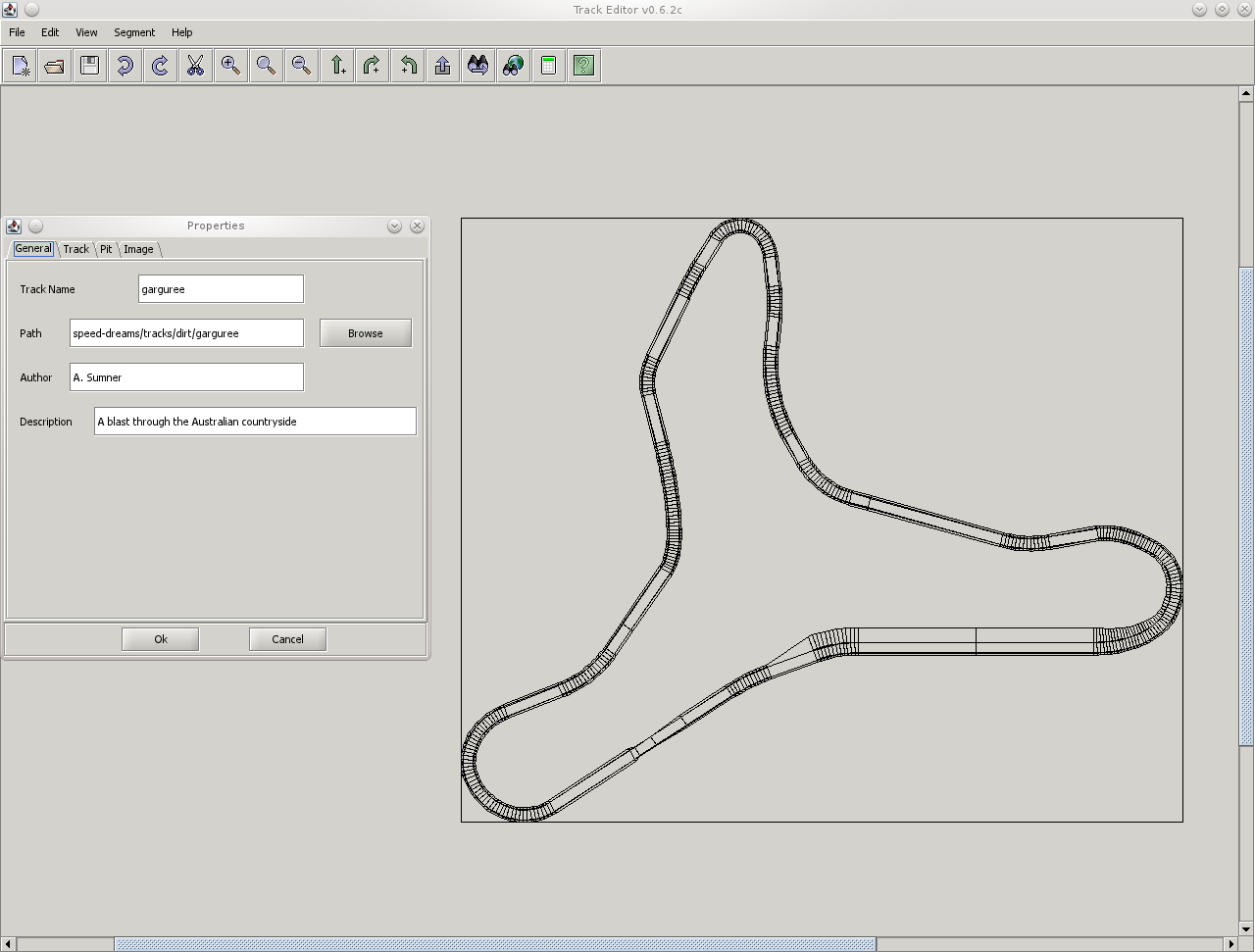
The main window of the track editor by Charalampos Alexandropoulos. On the left, the "General" tab of the "Properties" window, useful for customizing the track's name, path, author and description.

==== External tools ====
Text files describing the track's structure and 3D model are often too intricate to be edited as plain text; hence the need of external tools developed to help with track creation. The most popular graphical track editor, originally developed for TORCS in Java by Charalampos Alexandropoulos, features slider widgets to edit most parameters and a real-time 2D preview of the track's wireframe appearance; as a downside, it doesn't support parameters newly introduced in Speed Dreams, such as the ones related to the dynamic sky dome. A new track editor, by Mart Kelder of the Speed Dreams team, is under development inside the SVN repository of the main project. The track's 3D description is a plain text AC/ACC file usually generated by a command-line script named trackgen. This tool supports the use of heightmaps and object maps to enhance the quality of the final result. Official tracks of the Speed Dreams 2.0 release feature baked (static) shadow mapping, achieved using trackgen in conjunction with external 3D computer graphics software. While the .AC format is natively handled by the AC3D software, an ACC importing/exporting script makes Blender a common choice among designers for providing tracks with complex objects. An application for automated track generation, named "Interactive Track Generator for TORCS and Speed Dreams", was developed at the Dipartimento di Elettronica e Informazione (ICT) of the Italian Politecnico di Milano university. The project aims at applying evolutionary computing, through the use of genetic programming, for a procedural generation of TORCS/Speed Dreams tracks. The generator was tuned with the help of human interaction and produces a continuous on-line stream of new track outlines, each with a set of different scenarios available.

== Development ==
System requirements
| Requirement | Minimum | Recommended |
Windows XP
| Operating system | Windows XP 32-bit | |
| CPU | 1.5 GHz | 2 GHz |
| Memory | 512 MB | 1 GB |
| Free space | 700 MB | 900 MB |
| Graphics hardware | OpenGL 1.3 capable card with 128 MB RAM (Nvidia GeForce3 or better, ATI Radeon 9000 or better, Intel HD 2000 or better) | OpenGL 1.5 capable card with 256 MB RAM (Nvidia GeForce FX 5200 Ultra or better, ATI Radeon 9500 or better, Intel HD 3000 or better) |
Windows Vista
| Operating system | Windows Vista 32/64-bit | |
| CPU | 1.5 GHz | 2 GHz |
| Memory | 2 GB | 3 GB |
| Free space | 700 MB | 900 MB |
| Graphics hardware | OpenGL 1.3 capable card with 128 MB RAM (Nvidia GeForce FX 5200 Ultra or better, ATI Radeon 9500 or better, Intel HD 3000 or better) | OpenGL 1.5 capable card with 256 MB RAM (Nvidia GeForce 6600 GT or better, ATI Radeon X1300 or better) |
Windows 7
| Operating system | Windows 7 32/64-bit | |
| CPU | 1.5 GHz | 2 GHz |
| Memory | 1 GB | 2 GB |
| Free space | 700 MB | 900 MB |
| Graphics hardware | OpenGL 1.3 capable card with 128 MB RAM (Nvidia GeForce FX 5200 Ultra or better, ATI Radeon 9500 or better, Intel HD 3000 or better) | OpenGL 1.5 capable card with 256 MB RAM (Nvidia GeForce 6600 GT or better, ATI Radeon X1300 or better) |
Linux 32-bit
| Operating system | Linux 32-bit | |
| CPU | 1.5 GHz | 2 GHz |
| Memory | 1 GB | 1.5 GB |
| Free space | 900 MB | 1 GB |
| Graphics hardware | OpenGL 1.3 capable card with 128 MB RAM (Nvidia GeForce3 or better, ATI Radeon 9500 or better, Intel HD 2000 or better) | OpenGL 1.5 capable card with 256 MB RAM (Nvidia FX 5200 Ultra or better, ATI Radeon X1300 or better, Intel HD 3000 or better) |
Linux 64-bit
| Operating system | Linux 64-bit | |
| CPU | 1.5 GHz | 2 GHz |
| Memory | 1.5 GB | 2 GB |
| Free space | 900 MB | 1 GB |
| Graphics hardware | OpenGL 1.3 capable card with 128 MB RAM (Nvidia GeForce3 or better, ATI Radeon 9500 or better, Intel HD 2000 or better) | OpenGL 1.5 capable card with 256 MB RAM (Nvidia FX 5200 or better, ATI Radeon X1300 or better, Intel HD 3000 or better) |

=== Requirements ===
As of version 2.0, Speed Dreams still relies on OpenGL 1.3 for rendering. Due to the new graphical and physical features, computing power required has risen compared to TORCS. Yet, the use of PLIB, which doesn't need support for OpenGL 2, still lets Speed Dreams run on old – back to 2001 – video cards. In order to increase the performance of the simulation, dual threading was introduced in version 1.4.0: dividing the simulation work between a physics and a graphics thread allows the program to take advantage from multi-core CPUs.

=== Underlying software ===
The core architecture, which is still quite the same of TORCS, features a flexible structure that loads as separated modules the components of the simulation, such as the physics, graphics and robot engines. The graphics engine, PLIB's SimpleSceneGraph, offers high-level access to OpenGL functions; PLIB is also a possible choice to deal with sound, the other one − selectable by the user − being OpenAL. Another legacy from TORCS was the need of freeglut, which was removed after version 1.4.0. An SDL-port of the code, in order to get rid of the need of freeglut, was active from October 2008 to February 2010, when it was merged with the main project's trunk, but in some distributions freeglut still figures as a dependency for the Speed Dreams packages. The ENet library was used during the development of network play; while this feature was not released in version 2.0.0, it remained as a dependency in most packages. In the first months since the project's birth, the build system was moved from make to the more advanced CMake.

== The project ==
According to the community leaders, the project was born as a reaction to the slow development pace and the lack of willingness to integrate some new features, like Force Feedback, into TORCS code. At start the team was composed by only two developers, both from France; by the end of 2008 it had been joined by 5 more members, mostly old TORCS contributors who shared the above frustration. Accessions didn't cease during the following years, and release 2.0 was issued by an international development team numbering 12 people from 8 countries and 3 continents.

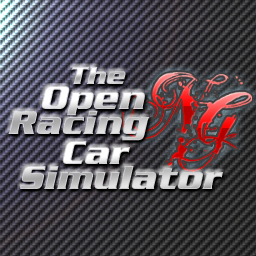
The Torcs-NG logo as it appeared in 2009 on a pylon texture

=== History ===
The content of the r1-3-1 branch of the TORCS CVS repository was forked into a new SVN repository in September 2008. At first the name chosen for the project was "Torcs-NG" (Next Generation). After a year of development, in August 2009 the development team decided to sever ties with the parent project: there followed a long discussion about a new name to adopt, in which Speed Dreams was selected by means of a developer community vote. The "non-free" content inherited from TORCS was also moved to an unmaintained "legacy" branch and replaced with new cars, tracks and robot engines. The first public release was then issued on March 27, 2010, as Speed Dreams 1.4.0, preserving the old versioning system of TORCS. However, for some reason, the release wasn't publicly advertised until April 14; five days later, the number of daily downloads reached 4,120. The development of the next version was started immediately after the release, and four months later the first alpha of Speed Dreams 2.0 was issued. According to the release plan, the final release should have been delivered by the end of 2010, but development progressed more slowly than expected, and only after 18 months, 5 development releases and more than 2,000 code changes a release candidate of version 2.0 was issued (January 15, 2012). The final version was finally released on April 8, 2012, the most prominent improvements being reworked reflections and menus, and the introduction of Career mode, dynamic weather, SimuV2.1 and dual-threading. Again, the official announcement came with a delay of some weeks; download figures started rising only after advertising began (25 April 2012) and reached about 500/day.

=== Community ===
Among the declared aims of the project, since its start, was a particular care to the players community, namely taking more into account the feedback and suggestions of the end-users; for this reason, a number of new communication channels were opened. First were the user and developer mailing lists on SourceForge.net: created along with the main project, they remain by far the most used channel, the speed-dreams-devel list having reached a milestone of 10,000 messages on March 16, 2012; (Note: The 10,000th message was, for a peculiar circumstance, an announcement related to this Wikipedia article; it can be found here.) there followed public forums on SourceForge.net, which, however, were never widely used; an official Twitter account was created two weeks before the release of version 1.4.0: as of May 2012, it is followed by 147 subscribers and has sent 124 tweets. In the end of 2011, the project created official pages on the popular social networks Facebook and Google+.

=== Distribution and packaging ===
Official releases include a source code package and a Windows installer, but Linux users aren't forced to compile the source code: binary packages are available, either provided within a distribution or through external repositories. The first package made available was an Ubuntu .deb of version 1.4.0, created by PlayDeb.net. As it didn't get updated for development releases of version 2.0, the Speed Dreams team created an official PPA on Launchpad; as of May 2012, Speed Dreams is packaged for the following distributions:

| Distribution name | Notes |
|---|---|
| Ubuntu | Xtradeb.net |
| Debian | User-built package on SourceForge.net (1.4.0) |
| Arch Linux | "Community" repository (2.0.0 i686 and x86_64) |
| Mageia | Provided with Mageia's development release Cauldron (2.0.0) |
| Fedora | Official 1.4.0 packages for Mandriva have been reported to work fine; an RPM source package of version 2.0.0 is also available. |
| Slackware | Build scripts provided by SlackBuilds.org (2.2.3_r7616) |
| Frugalware | Build files − allowing to compile the source code − provided since version 1.6 (1.4.0) |
| Gentoo | ebuild provided within Gentoo repository (1.4.0) |
| openSUSE | Packages provided by the openSUSE build service (2.0.0) |
| live.linuX-gamers.net | Provided on the live DVD of the gaming distribution linuX-gamers.net (1.4.0) |
| AppImage | Official package located on SourceForge, Mirror in AppImageHub |
| Flatpak | Package provided by Flathub repository |

A port of version 1.4.0 for the Haiku operating system was made available on Haikuware.com in April 2011; according to the packager, only minor changes to the code were needed to get Speed Dreams running.

Speed Dreams was made available also on the digital distribution platform Desura in March 2012. This platform was the first to publish the Windows binary packages for version 2.0, just two days after they were officially released. As of May 2012, the project is ranked 276 out of 6,558 projects.

==== Commercial redistribution ====
In April 2012 the development team was made aware of a commercial derivative of Speed Dreams. Initially believed to be a clone of TORCS, the product – published by the German company jalada GmbH – had been rebranded as jalada Ultimate Racing and sold for €12.09 since August 2011. The publisher claimed features such as force feedback support, and a Mac OS X port available at the same price. Although the GNU General Public License allows reselling of free software, this commercial redistribution doesn't comply with the requirement of express attribution to the original authors which is stated by the Free Art License, applied to the whole artwork of Speed Dreams.

=== Critical reception ===
Speed Dreams has received a wide variety of reviews, on technology websites, distribution platforms and open source software websites. Immediately after the release of version 1.4.0, Speed Dreams reached the first place in the "les plus populaires" ("the most popular") user ranking on the French free gaming portal JeuxLibres.net; as of April 2012, the project still maintains the second place. Published in the November 7, 2011 issue of the German computer magazine c't, a review of Speed Dreams 2.0-beta1 pointed out the quality of cars' physics and race balancing. In 2011, Speed Dreams was among the 23 candidates for the "Mejor juego libre" ("Best free game") prize by PortalProgramas, achieving the 13th place. As of May 2012, the project's files have been downloaded 595,000 times from the SF.net portal, but this figure, though, is disputable because of the January 2011 attacks on SourceForge.net. (Note: On 25 and 26 January 2011, download figures reached respectively 17,340 and 11,366: up to 20 times the number of average daily downloads of the previous week, without any new file release from the project.) More relevant are then the average periodic data, reaching about 1600 weekly downloads − or 230 per day − in the first months of 2012. As of May 2012, the project has received an average user rating of 88% out of 95 reviews on SourceForge.net portal. On the Linux gaming portal Penguspy, at the same date, Speed Dreams had received a mark of 9.49/10 out of 65 votes, which earned the project the first place within the "Racing" category, and the 18th place overall (8th considering only the open source games). On Desura, in the same period, the project's score was of 6/10 out of 90 reviews; the discrepancy can be interpreted as a result of the coexistence − on this platform − of both open source and proprietary video games.

== See also ==
- VDrift, another open source racing simulation
- Sim racing
- List of open-source video games
