= Elona (disambiguation) =

Elona is a genus of gastropods.

Elona may also refer to:

- Elona (video game), a 2007 video game for the Windows platform
- fictional continent and setting for the video game Guild Wars Nightfall
- a minor character in The Magicians of Xanth in the Xanth fantasy series by Piers Anthony
- A continent featured in Guild Wars 2's second expansion, Guild Wars 2: Path of Fire
- Elona Gjebrea, Albanian politician

== See also ==
- Ilona (disambiguation)
