= The Artisan of Glimmith =

2026 puzzle video game

- Developer: Lunarch Studios
- Publisher: 983 Interactive
- Platform: Windows
- Release: 17 March 2026
- Genre: Puzzle
- Mode: Single-player

The Artisan of Glimmith is a 2026 puzzle video game. Players solve logic puzzles based on dividing and coloring two-dimensional grids to restore stained glass windows. Developed by Lunarch Studios, the game was published by 983 Interactive and released in March 2026 for Windows. Critics praised the game's general concept, puzzle design, visual style, and atmosphere, while some noted concerns with the method and presentation of level selection.

== Gameplay ==
A completed puzzle with three rules

The Artisan of Glimmith is a single-player puzzle game where players solve a series of logic puzzles. Players restore stained glass windows by dividing two-dimensional grids into regions according to various rules. For example, one rule specifies the number of grid squares each region is allowed to contain, one specifies the shape of each region, and another specifies the number of other regions a region may border. Though each region is colored, the colors are freely choosable by the player as an aesthetic choice and do not affect the logic of the puzzles. The grid and applicable rules are visible to the player while solving the puzzles, but disappear once the puzzles are solved, presenting the solution as a stained glass pane. Each puzzle has a single unique solution.

Puzzles are given a difficulty rating from 1 to 7, with 7 being the most difficult. Initial puzzles focus on a single rule at time; more difficult optional puzzles present players with combinations of multiple rules at once. The game has over 20 different rules.

The game features a level editor, and players can share their created puzzles.

== Development and release ==
The Artisan of Glimmith was developed by Lunarch Studios, a Toronto, Canada-based indie studio of around 20 people first founded in 2010. They had previously developed Prismata (2018), Jelly is Sticky (2022), and Islands of Insight (2024). Islands of Insight was a puzzle game with similar logic puzzle mechanics, but with a shared world and MMORPG mechanics. The Artisan of Glimmith has been described as a distilled, single-player, version of the mechanics of Islands of Insight.

An announcement trailer and a demo were released on 30 December 2025. The game was released on 17 March 2026 for Windows, and was published by 983 Interactive.

== Reception ==
Writing for Kotaku, Mateo Lucio described The Artisan of Glimmith as opting for a slower, more contemplative game based on combining simple rules, rather than opting for complex mechanics or story. He described the puzzles as creating a feeling of discovery, and felt the game would appeal to more experienced players, with its more challenging puzzles forcing them to combine different techniques. 4Gamer.net praised the variety of puzzles available, and commented that the level editor would allows players to expand upon this variety. GameSpark's Kagami Toshin commented positively on the quantity of puzzles and them being handmade.

4Gamer also praised the visual style, in particular the finished stained glass panes. Writing for Thinky Games, Robin Bea described the color customization as satisfying and "a nice artistic touch". Multiple reviewers described the game as calming. Writing for Czech publication GamingProfessors, Nikola Erlebachová compared the experience of the game to the real-world process of creating stained glass, describing the game as rewarding patience and thinking ahead.

The overworld and method of level selection drew both positive and negative feedback, with GameCritics.com's Ben Schwartz describing some levels as "bootleg hobbit holes", whereas Kagami described finding the hidden puzzles as fun. Erlebachová commented that the fixed overhead view limited their ability to appreciate the completed works of stained glass.

The Artisan of Glimmith received positive user reviews on Steam, referencing its structure of introducing rules and its atmosphere, which users described as calming. Automaton Media described the feedback as "almost 100% positive".
