= Warzone 2100 =

1999 video game

- Original authors: Pumpkin Studios (original developer); Eidos Interactive (original publisher)
- Developers: Pumpkin Studios; Warzone 2100 Project
- Release: Microsoft Windows; March 26, 1999; PlayStation: NA: June 22, 1999; EU: 2000; macOS: WW: January 30, 2012; Linux: WW: January 30, 2012
- Stable release: 4.7.0 / 7 April 2026; 7 months ago
- Written in: C++
- Platform: Microsoft Windows, macOS, PlayStation, FreeBSD, AmigaOS 4, AROS, MorphOS, Linux, NetBSD, OpenBSD
- Type: Real-time strategy, Real-time tactics
- Licence: GPL-2.0-or-later
- Website: wz2100.net
- Repository: github.com/Warzone2100/warzone2100

Warzone 2100 is an open-source real-time strategy and real-time tactics hybrid computer game, originally developed by Pumpkin Studios and published by Eidos Interactive. It was originally released in 1999 for Microsoft Windows and PlayStation, and is now also available for macOS, FreeBSD, AmigaOS 4, AROS, MorphOS, Linux, NetBSD and OpenBSD.

While Warzone 2100 was developed and released as a proprietary commercial video game, on December 6, 2004, the source code and most of its data was released under the GNU GPL-2.0-or-later; the rest of the data followed on June 10, 2008.

== Synopsis ==
=== Setting ===
In the late 21st century, the world's civilizations are wiped out by a series of nuclear strikes, seemingly caused by a massive malfunction of the new NASDA (North American Strategic Defense Agency) strategic defense system. While most of the survivors form scavenger bands to survive, the player is a member of a group named "The Project", that is more organised and seeks to rebuild civilization using pre-war technology.

=== Plot ===
The game begins with The Project sending three teams (Alpha, Beta, and Gamma) to gather technology that would help with reconstruction; the player assumes command of Team Alpha in Arizona. While gathering pre-war "artifacts", the Project fends off attacks from an organization called the New Paradigm, another major survivalist organisation, which is more advanced than the player's forces. Later however, it is discovered that a self-aware computer virus named 'Nexus' is actually controlling the New Paradigm.

After the player defeats the New Paradigm, they are assigned to Team Beta, which is based in Chicago and under attack by a faction called 'The Collective'. Again, the player starts out less advanced than 'The Collective' and it is discovered that Nexus is controlling this faction too. At the end of the campaign, Nexus launches nuclear missiles at Alpha and Beta bases, prompting the player to abandon the facility and move to the Gamma base.

Upon arriving at Gamma base, the player is immediately ambushed by the Gamma forces, which have already been taken over by Nexus. After the player survives the ambush and develops countermeasures to 'Nexus' infection, Nexus takes control of the remaining NASDA satellites and attempts to destroy the player. However, before he can succeed, the Project captures a NASDA missile site, and shoots down the orbiting laser weapons. It is learned that the scientist Dr. Reed, who was bankrupted by the US military, transformed himself into the Nexus virus and was responsible for the nuclear holocaust by infiltrating the 'NASDA' systems. At this point, the survivors of the Alpha and Beta bases arrive, and the three Project teams launch a full-scale assault on Nexus. The Project destroys Nexus and can begin rebuilding civilization.

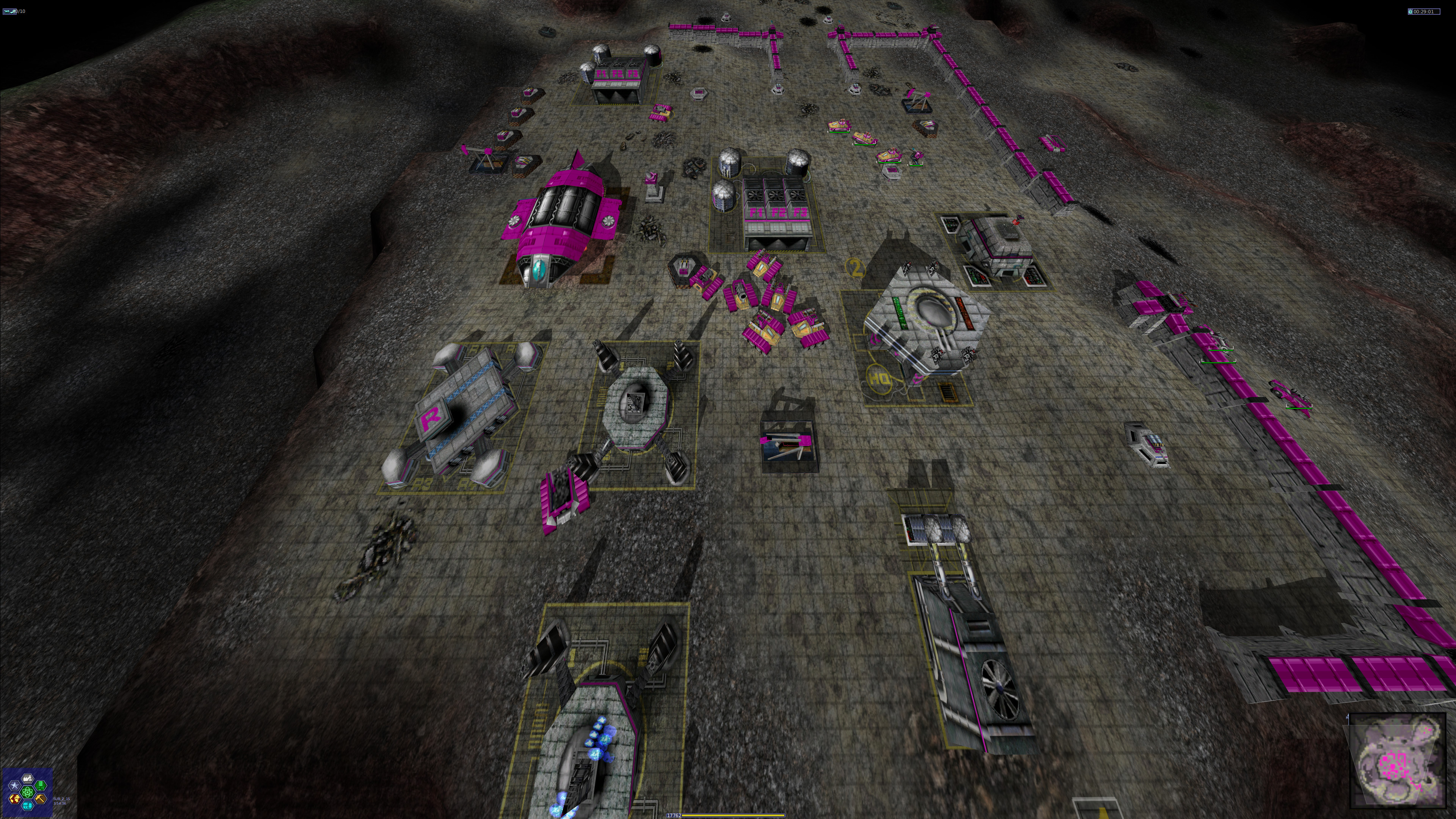
A base and some units in Warzone 2100 campaign mode (version 3.2.3)

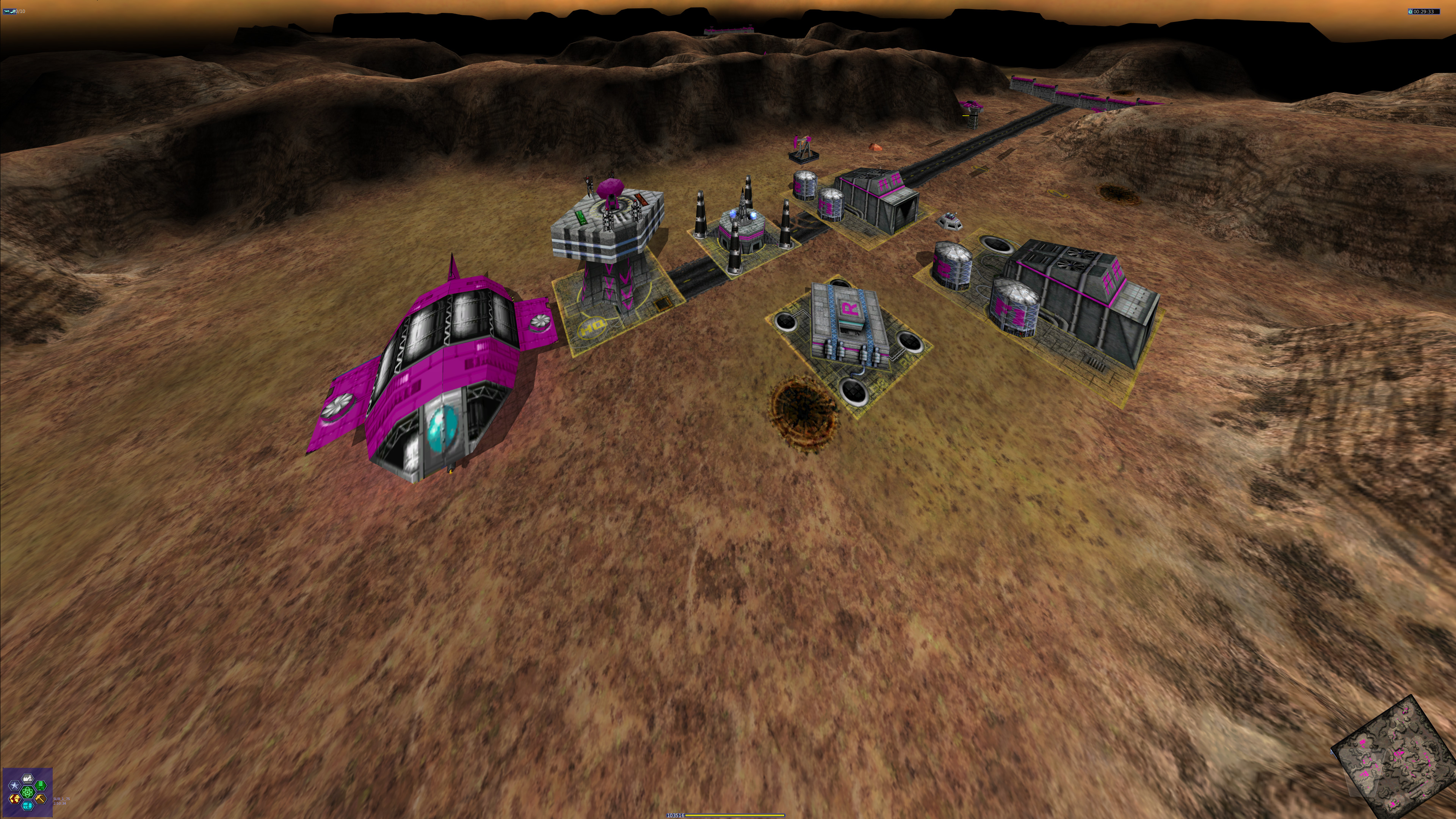
Warzone 2100 version 3.2.3 - campaign mode

== Gameplay ==
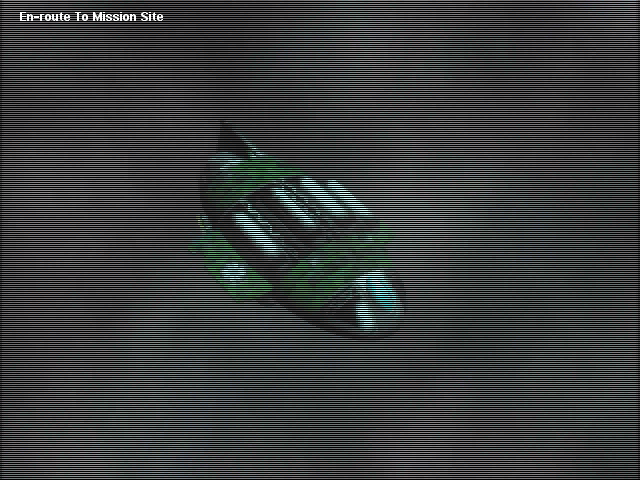
Videos frequently appear during gameplay. This image depicts a dropship transporting the player's forces towards the campaign's first Away mission.

The game is fully 3D, based on the iViS 3D graphics engine developed by Sam Kerbeck of Eidos Interactive. The game world is mapped by a grid; vehicles tilt to meet hilly terrain, and projectiles can be realistically blocked by steep mountains or buildings. The camera is free-moving and can zoom in and out, rotate, and pan up or down while navigating the battlefield.

In the game, units of different factions are painted different colors. The New Paradigm, the Collective, and Nexus are the enemies of the Project in the campaign, and they can be seen attacking Project forces as well as Scavengers, survivors of the nuclear fallout.

Units can all be customized according to: chassis (which, for example, takes weight and power into account); drive system (such as wheels or tracks); and mounted object (such as a weapon, or one of various support tools). Units can earn experience. Earning experience causes units to level up from ranks such as Rookie to Trained and Professional.

Warzone 2100 places an emphasis on sensors and radar to detect units and to coordinate ground attacks. Counter-battery sensors detect enemy artillery by sensing their projectiles and firing arcs and pinpointing their location to coordinate artillery strikes against enemy artillery. VTOL (Vertical Take-Off and Landing) sensors work like basic sensors, only they coordinate VTOL airstrikes. VTOL counter-battery sensors coordinate VTOLs to find and destroy enemy artillery batteries.

There is an emphasis on artillery: although many direct- and close-combat weapons and anti-air weapons can be researched and deployed, artillery is a staple of assault on enemy bases and outposts. While the technology tree is clearly defined and consistent, it never appears in-game and, therefore, the player can be left guessing as to what technology is next in the tree. Technology can be acquired by gathering artifacts left behind by certain destroyed enemy structures or units. Researching is composed of largely small and incremental advancements over existing weapons, armor, and chassis types.

Some levels require the player to achieve the objective within a time limit whilst some without these limits can be used to gather "power". In Away missions, the player must select a limited group of units to transport to a territory completely removed from the original base.

All of the terrain throughout the campaign is essentially composed of three areas, with different sectors for Away missions and other such levels; upon progression, previous maps simply expand and the player's original bases from past levels are maintained. Also, its resource system is quite different from mainstream RTS games; Oil Derricks are established over specific, scarce locations which constantly provide a slow, fixed rate of income. Combined with a mission time limit, this resource method makes it generally difficult for players to utilize certain traditional RTS tactics such as "turtling", but far from impossible (fortifying one or more bases against enemy attack, while stockpiling resources with which to produce a massive army).

However, there are certain missions throughout the game that do not have a time limit, and in these missions it is possible to use more traditional RTS tactics to prepare for subsequent timed missions.

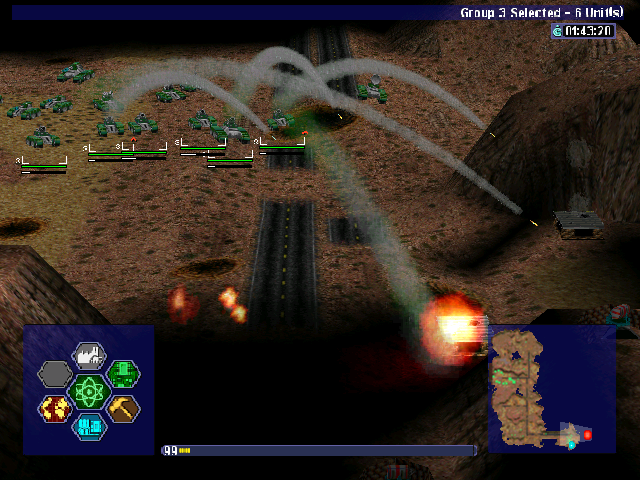
Screenshot of an older build of the game from 2008; mobile mortar weapons bombard Scavenger-occupied shacks from afar.

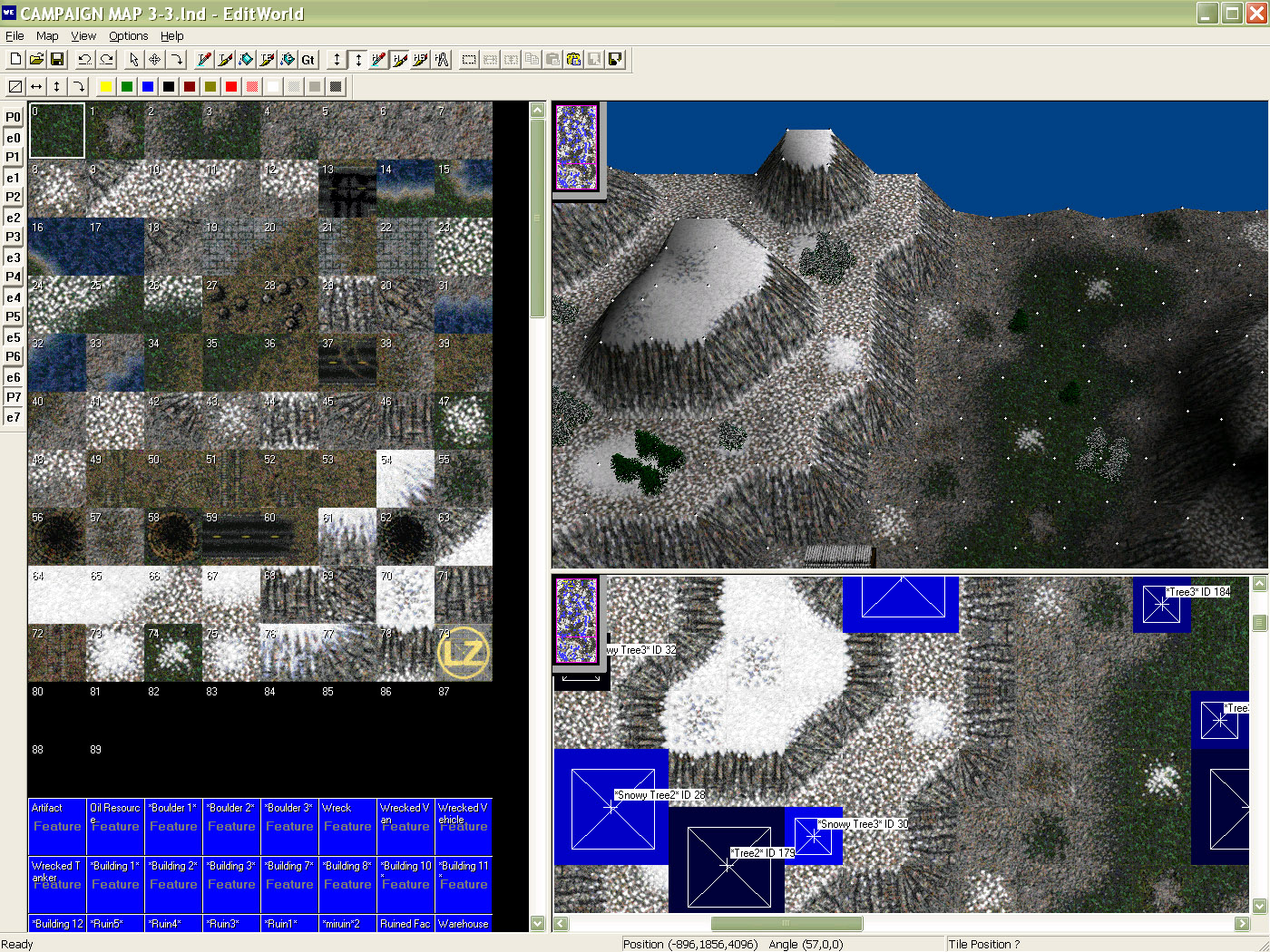
Warzone 2100 map editor (EditWorld)

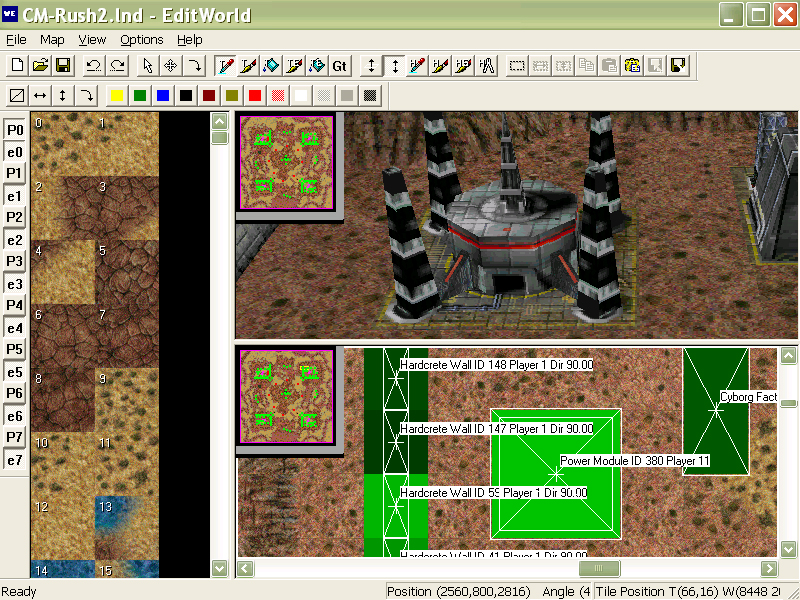
Warzone 2100 map editor (EditWorld)

== History ==
Warzone 2100 was originally developed by Pumpkin Studios and published by Eidos Interactive. In 1999 it was originally released for Microsoft Windows and PlayStation. After having released patch 1.10 final in November 1999, Pumpkin Studios ended their support for Warzone 2100 at January 5, 2000. On March 15, 2000, Pumpkin Studios was closed down by Eidos Interactive. Pumpkin Studios later reformed as Pivotal Games.

=== End of support and fan patch ===
After the official support ended with the dissolution of Pumpkin Studios, a third-party group of game enthusiasts, N.E.W.S.T., tried to continue the support in October 1999. Starting in November 2000, the group released unofficial patches which fixed many of the game's remaining problems. In February 2003 Pumpkin-2, the renamed N.E.W.S.T. group, sent a petition to copyright holder Eidos Interactive, asking for permission to get and use the source code and art content.

=== Open sourcing ===
On December 6, 2004 Warzone's source code was uploaded to Radiosity's FTP server by Alex McLean of Pivotal Games. Source code and artwork (beside the movies) of Warzone were placed under the GPL-2.0-or-later license, making the game free and open-source. On June 10, 2008, the license of the game was clarified; distribution of movies and soundtrack was now permitted, too.

=== Community driven development ===
Following the release, the game's community started a revival project, based on the available source code and assets: originally called "Warzone Re-Development Project", it was later renamed to the "Warzone 2100 Resurrection Project", and then to the "Warzone 2100 Project". On June 11, 2005, version 0.1 of the "Warzone 2100 Project" was released, with all proprietary technology replaced by free and open-source alternatives. As of 2025 the community development continues, and has been officially released on the Microsoft Store, Snap Store, itch.io, and others.

On February 18, 2020, an unofficial version of Warzone 2100 was released on the Steam gaming platform. Underdone Gaming has published only a Windows version of the game, with questions about other platforms left unanswered. The reception of the community to this release is generally negative and it is unlikely that community developers will aid technical support for the Steam version.

== Reception ==
Reception

Aggregate score
Aggregator	Score
GameRankings	PC: 81% PS1: 76%

Review scores
Publication	Score
AllGame	PC: 3/5
Computer Gaming World	PC: 3.5/5
Computer and Video Games	PC: 4/5
Edge	PC: 7/10
Electronic Gaming Monthly	PS1: 6.875/10 (Note: Four critics review the Playstation 1 port for Electronic Gaming Monthly, all of whom gave it a 7.5/10 except one that scored it 5/10.)
Game Informer	PS1: 7.75/10
GamePro	PS1: 3.125/5 (Note: GamePro scored the Playstation version 3.5/5 for graphics, 4/5 for sound, 1.5/5 for control, and 3.5/5 for play control.)
GameRevolution	PS1: B
GameSpot	PC: 7.6/10; PS1: 6.5/10
Hyper	PC: 87/100
IGN	PC: 8/10; PS1: 7.5/10
Next Generation	PC: 4/5; PS1: 2/5
PlayStation Official Magazine – UK	PS1: 9/10
Official U.S. PlayStation Magazine	PS1: 4/5
PC Accelerator	PC: 6/10
PC Gamer (US)	PC: 82%
PC Zone	PC: 90/100
PlayStation: The Official Magazine	PS1: 3/5

The game's new additions to the real-time strategy genre were positively noted, such as its create-a-unit feature, persistent world, 3D environments with control over a zoomable and rotatable floating camera, variety of terrain and environments, animated units, diverse colors, night-and-day mechanic, and numerous features.

GameSpot gave the PlayStation version a 6.5, and the PC version a 7.6. GameSpot praised the game for its high level of customizability and concluded, "Warzone 2100's highly navigable 3D engine, unique campaign structure, and multiplayer gameplay should please most real-time strategy fans."

IGN shared similar sentiments, rating the PC version 8.0, and the PlayStation version 7.5. IGN praised the PlayStation version for being one of the few RTS games on the system. IGN praised this aspect by saying "In the end the weird truth is that Warzone 2100 is one of the best RTS on the system." In their PC review, the author expressed disappointment with the lack of innovation, but praised it nonetheless with the following comment, "Mostly it boils down to taking great ideas found in other RTS titles and combining them into one. Pumpkin Studios did a fantastic job with that task and this one is certainly worth playing all the way through."

GameRevolution noted problems in the presentation, such as the "uninspiring" audio and "fuzzy graphics," and the lack of being able to save during gameplay. The PlayStation port was criticized for keeping the interface of the PC version, which was unsuitable for the PlayStation controller.

== See also ==
- List of free PC games
- List of open-source video games
