= Ilona (disambiguation) =

Ilona is a feminine given name. It may also refer to:

- Ilona (film), a 1921 German film
- 1182 Ilona, an asteroid
- Cyclone Ilona, which caused moderate damage in Australia in 1988
- Ilona (singer) (born 1985), Colombian singer-songwriter
