= RARS (video game) =

Open source 3D racing simulator

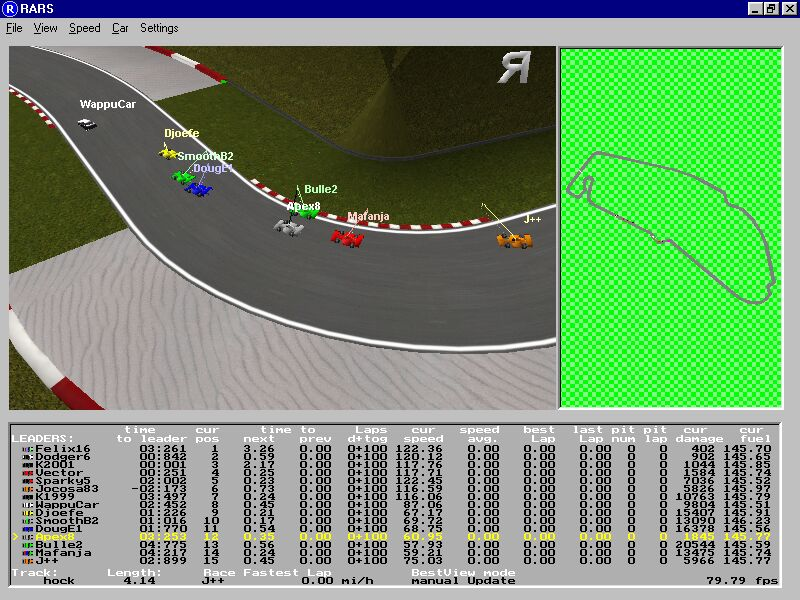
AI drivers trying to overtake on a curve. Overtaking was one of the most challenging parts of RARS competition, as touching another car usually caused an accident.

RARS is an acronym for Robot Auto Racing Simulator. It is an open source 3D racing simulator. RARS is designed to enable pre-programmed AI drivers to race against one another. RARS was used as the base for TORCS. It was used as an example in the book Intelligent Information Processing and Web Mining by Mieczysław Kłopotek.

It was a monthly on-going challenge for practitioners of artificial intelligence and real-time adaptive optimal control. It consists of:

- a simulation of the physics of cars racing on a track
- a graphic display of the race
- a separate control program (robot "driver") for each car

Each participant could submit a robot (a file written in C++) which controlled the car and competed to win the race.

- The input was the road and cars in front of it.
- The output was the driver wheel and driver accelerator position.

RARS was downloaded from its main repository on SourceForge.net between 2000 and May 2017 almost 100,000 times.
