= Renegade X =

2014 video game

- Developer: Totem Arts
- Producer: Waqas Iqbal
- Series: Command & Conquer
- Engine: Unreal Engine 3
- Platform: Microsoft Windows
- Release: February 26, 2014
- Genres: First-person shooter Third-person shooter Real-time strategy
- Modes: Single-player; Multiplayer

Renegade X is a tactical first and third-person shooter video game with real-time strategy elements. It is a free, remake of Command & Conquer: Renegade, which itself was a spin-off of the strategy series Command & Conquer published by Westwood Studios and later by Electronic Arts (EA). The developers entered open beta on February 26, 2014.

== Gameplay ==
Renegade X is a tactical shooter with elements from the original Command & Conquer. It boasts 64-player servers spread across two unique factions, the Global Defense Initiative and the Brotherhood of Nod, each with a different roster containing dozens of infantry classes with customizable equipment and 15 vehicles. Players can change class or order vehicles using credits, which are earned in a variety of ways. The aim is to destroy the opposing team's base while protecting your own, with each structure in the base having a specific purpose, and the loss of which detrimentally affects the owning team.

== Development ==
Totem Arts was formed as a volunteer team in 2006 by Waqas Iqbal (Havoc89), with the aim of remaking Command & Conquer: Renegade as a mod for Unreal Tournament 3. The mod was released in 2009 and received multiple awards. In 2010, Totem Arts decided to make a full standalone version and released a single-player mini-campaign called Operation Black Dawn in January 2012. The multiplayer beta was released in 2014.

== Reception ==
Renegade X won six awards across its development lifetime, including "#2 Best Vehicle Set" for the Making Something Unreal Contest, "#3 Best Upcoming Mod" for Mod of the Year 2008, "#4 Best Machinima" and "#2 Best Multiplayer" for Mod of the Year 2009. Despite legal concerns from the community, Totem Arts has received support and encouragement from EA Games as well as former Westwood studio developers, and reviews have praised it as containing "all of the high-quality action and entertainment values from a AAA big-budget title".

In 2014, Renegade X was named by PC Gamer among the "Ten top fan remade classics you can play for free right now".
