= 1182 Ilona =

Stony asteroid

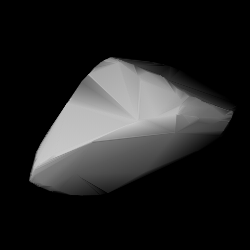
- Modelled shape of Ilona from its lightcurve

Discovery
- Discovered by: K. Reinmuth
- Discovery site: Heidelberg Obs.
- Discovery date: 3 March 1927

Designations
- Named after: unknown
- Alternative designations: 1927 EA · A915 RD
- Minor planet category: main-belt · (inner)

Orbital characteristics
- Epoch 4 September 2017 (JD 2458000.5)
- Uncertainty parameter 0
- Observation arc: 90.33 yr (32,993 days)
- Aphelion: 2.5261 AU
- Perihelion: 1.9930 AU
- Semi-major axis: 2.2596 AU
- Eccentricity: 0.1180
- Orbital period (sidereal): 3.40 yr (1,241 days)
- Mean anomaly: 328.01°
- Mean motion: 0° 17^{m} 24.72^{s} / day
- Inclination: 9.3881°
- Longitude of ascending node: 336.38°
- Argument of perihelion: 63.035°

Physical characteristics
- Dimensions: 12.67±2.95 km 13.29±2.48 km 13.448±0.074 km 14.09 km (derived); 14.162±0.257; 14.26±0.8 km 17.88±0.62 km
- Synodic rotation period: 14.938±0.005 h 29.8±0.1 h 29.853±0.0627 h
- Geometric albedo: 0.175±0.014; 0.2039 (derived); 0.22±0.11; 0.221±0.016; 0.2624±0.030; 0.29±0.13; 0.2957±0.0367
- Spectral type: S
- Absolute magnitude (H): 11.04±0.96 · 11.3 · 11.50 · 11.536±0.004 (R) · 11.6 · 11.77

1182 Ilona, provisional designation 1927 EA, is a stony asteroid from the inner regions of the asteroid belt, approximately 14 kilometers in diameter. It was discovered by German astronomer Karl Reinmuth at the Heidelberg Observatory on 3 March 1927, and later named Ilona. Any reference to its name is unknown.

== Classification and orbit ==
Ilona orbits the Sun in the inner main-belt at a distance of 2.0–2.5 AU once every 3 years and 5 months (1,241 days). Its orbit has an eccentricity of 0.12 and an inclination of 9° with respect to the ecliptic. The asteroid was first identified as A915 RD at Bergedorf Observatory in September 1915. The body's observation arc, however, begins at Heidelberg one night after its official discovery observation.

== Naming ==
Any reference to a person or occurrence of this minor planet's name is unknown. The name was suggested by German astronomer Gustav Stracke.

=== Unknown meaning ===
Among the many thousands of named minor planets, Ilona is one of 120 asteroids, for which no official naming citation has been published. All of these low-numbered asteroids have numbers between 164 Eva and 1514 Ricouxa and were discovered between 1876 and the 1930s, predominantly by astronomers Auguste Charlois, Johann Palisa, Max Wolf and Karl Reinmuth.

== Physical characteristics ==
Ilona is an assumed stony S-type asteroid.

=== Rotation period and shape ===
Three rotational lightcurve of Ilona were obtained from photometric observations. Lightcurve analysis gave a rotation period of 29.8 hours (including an alternative period solution 14.938 hours, or half the period) with a brightness variation of 0.98 to 1.20 magnitude (U=2/2/2). A high brightness amplitude typically indicates that the body has a non-spheroidal shape.

=== Diameter and albedo ===
According to the surveys carried out by the Infrared Astronomical Satellite IRAS, the Japanese Akari satellite, and NASA's Wide-field Infrared Survey Explorer with its subsequent NEOWISE mission, Ilona measures between 12.67 and 17.88 kilometers in diameter and its surface has an albedo between 0.175 and 0.2957. The Collaborative Asteroid Lightcurve Link derives an albedo of 0.2039 and calculates a diameter of 14.09 kilometers based on an absolute magnitude of 11.6.
