= Transcendence (video game) =

1995 video game

- Publisher(s): Kronosaur Productions
- Designer(s): George Moromisato
- Platform(s): Windows
- Release: Version 0.5: May 2, 1995 Version 0.7: November 28, 2003; Version 1.0: March 13, 2010; Version 1.2: November 22, 2013; Version 1.5: November 21, 2014; Version 1.7: February 28, 2017 Version 1.9: December 3, 2021
- Genre(s): Action RPG, shoot 'em up
- Mode(s): Single-player

Transcendence is a sci-fi-themed, freeware, action RPG for Microsoft Windows. It was created by George Moromisato.

== Gameplay ==
The player begins the game in one of three ships with basic equipment, a few credits (one of the two in-game currencies), and a near-empty cargo bay. This ship cannot be changed or upgraded to another ship, so the players are recommended to choose wisely. The player controls their ship in a two-dimensional universe, representing the planetary plane of various star systems; stargates are used to travel between star systems. The player encounters various stations and ships, friends as well as enemies while exploring the depths of the known universe.

The player collects money and items by several means, such as trading, looting the remains of destroyed ships or stations, escorting freighters, or agreeing to medical experiments. Key systems and encounters are pre-planned, while the less important systems and events are algorithmically generated, which makes the game very variable and re-playable. There are dozens of various adventure factors, such as military assignments, smuggling, and defense missions. Some missions provide access to better technologies and the ability to upgrade equipment on the player's ship.

Ships are protected by segments of armor and some also have a shield generator equipped. The player's ship has four armor segments and a shield: damage is absorbed by the shield which regenerates even while taking damage. However, if the shield is depleted then the player's individual armor segments are damaged depending on the angle of incoming attacks. If any one armor segment reaches below zero health then the player's ship is destroyed and the game ends. Some of the larger ships (both friendlies and enemies) have internal 'compartments' on top of armour. To destroy these ships, the player must first deplete an armour segment and then destroy the compartments lying underneath. This 'compartment' system was introduced in Transcendence version 1.6. It added another layer of fun and challenge to the game. Destroying compartments is essential to beat large ships, but if too many compartments are damaged, the chances to get the destroyed ship's equipment intact become less. None of the playerships have compartments. There are also limited weapon and device (devices are equipment which provide certain abilities, like faster acceleration to maximum speed) slots, which cannot be expanded. Armour also is installable up to a certain limit, which depends on the weight of the armour segments, which varies from ship to ship.

The player is guided and to some extent protected by the deity Domina; through donations in Domina monastery stations the player can be granted limited use of Domina's powers. There is another deity, called Oracus. Oracus is the opposite deity to Domina. Oracus does not aid the player, nor does Oracus create challenges for the player. The role of Oracus in the current game (The Stars of the Pilgrim) is dormant.

== Plot ==
Transcendence is installed with one storyline (known as an adventure), The Stars of the Pilgrim which is a part of the "Domina and Oracus" trilogy. Part 2 is in development and part 3 is in early planning stages. Additional adventures are available as mods or as downloadable content.

=== Setting ===
Transcendence is set in a fictional version of the Milky Way. Stars of the Pilgrim takes place in the year 2419. Humans inhabit a part of the galaxy known as Human Space, which is divided into three parts: the New Beyond, Ungoverned Territories and the Outer Realm. Within the galaxy are stargates, devices used for faster-than-light interstellar travel, left behind by alien races. In 2363, years before the game takes place, humans made contact with the Iocrym, who are members of the ancient races. Two mysterious beings, Domina and Oracus, inhabit the core of the galaxy. Domina is worshipped as a protector of all life in the galaxy, while Oracus is viewed as Domina's enemy.

=== Stars of the Pilgrim ===
The player's character receives a dream from the deity Domina, who compels the player to join her at the galaxy's core. The player, referred to as a pilgrim, leaves their home in a station in the Eridani star system and visits a monastery, where they are given training for their journey by the Sisters of Domina.

Leaving their home system, the player encounters various space stations and space ships, members of the Commonwealth, outlaws and other factions separated from Earth, which has been left behind since the Commonwealth now focuses on St. Katharine's Star.

At the Heretic system, the Iocrym block the pilgrim's path, having created an event horizon that prevents humans from leaving the inner system. The Iocrym imposed the quarantine in an attempt to protect the ancient races from Oracus, believing that humans are part of the threat posed by Oracus. The pilgrim works with scientists from the various human factions to shut down the quarantine. Fighting through Iocrym forces, the pilgrim reactivates the outer stargate, allowing them to continue their journey.

== Development ==
A preliminary version 0.5 alpha release of the game that would become Transcendence was made available in 1995.

The game is still under development, with roughly three-quarters of the game completed and its first milestone of version 1.0 reached. It is modifiable in the form of XML files. The game is available for download free of charge on the official website, without any formal license. The latest release implements online connectivity to the game including automatic updates and an adventure manager that allows players to download additional adventures for the game.

In 2015, the game was added to Steam.

=== Extensions ===
The game is extensively extendable. It features an XML format with scripting in TransLISP, a custom Lisp dialect designed for the game. It allows players to rewrite and add in-game objects, or even Adventures that create brand-new settings and game stories.

Two expansion packs were published for the game :

- Corporate Command, released in 2013
- Eternity Port, released in 2014

Both add new star systems, different start points, new starting ships, and other changes of gameplay.
