= TORCS =

Car racing simulator

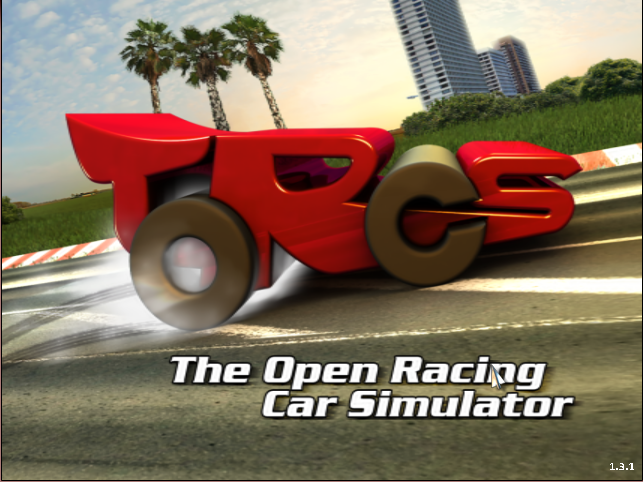
- Splash screen
- Original authors: Eric Espié and Christophe Guionneau
- Developers: Bernhard Wymann, et al.
- Release: 1997
- Stable release: v1.3.10 / October 1, 2026; 0 days ago
- Written in: C++
- Engine: PLIB
- Platform: Cross-platform
- Type: Racing game
- License: GNU GPL, Free Art license
- Website: torcs.sourceforge.net
- Repository: sourceforge.net/projects/torcs/

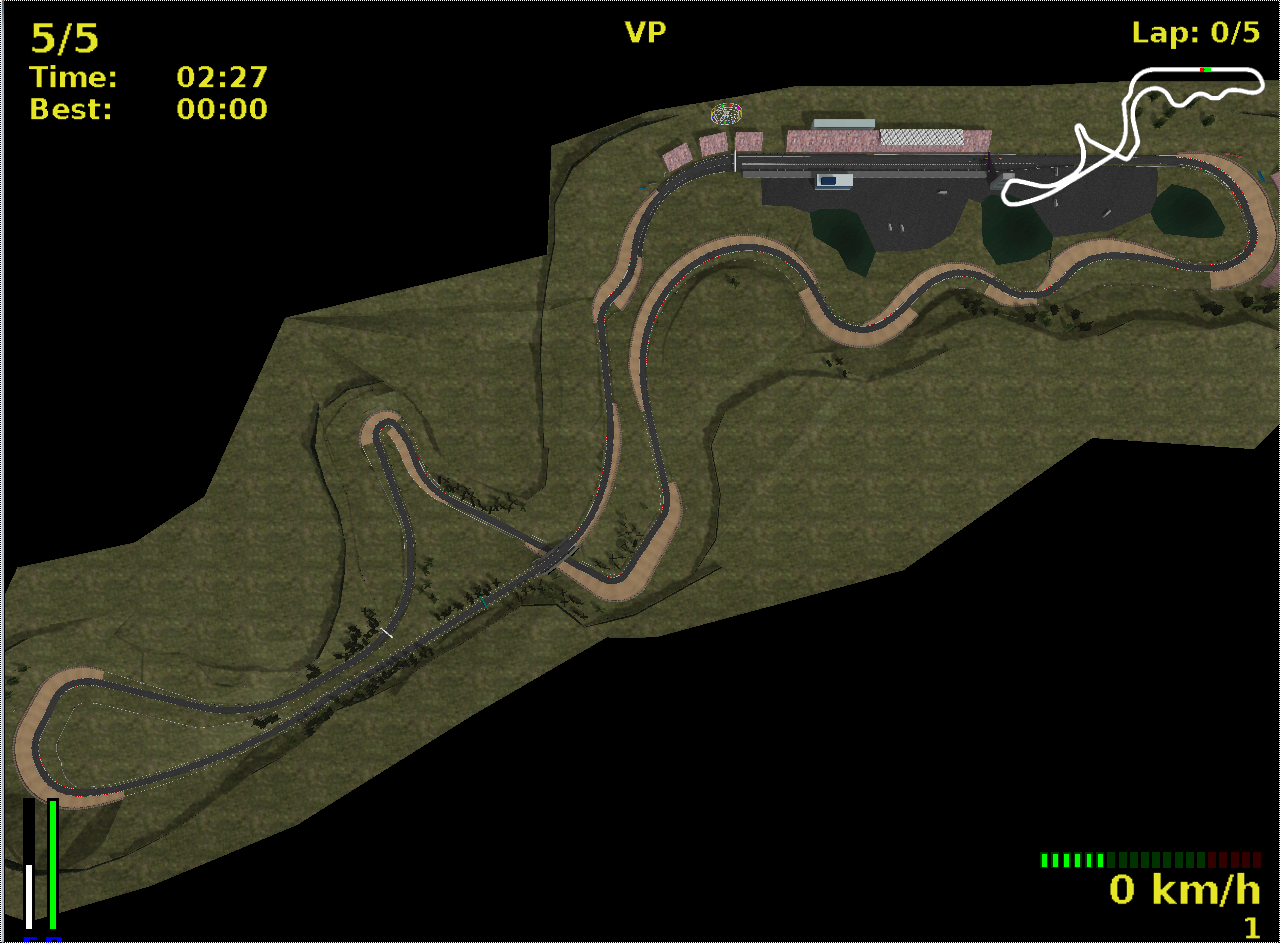
Race track in Torcs in top-down view

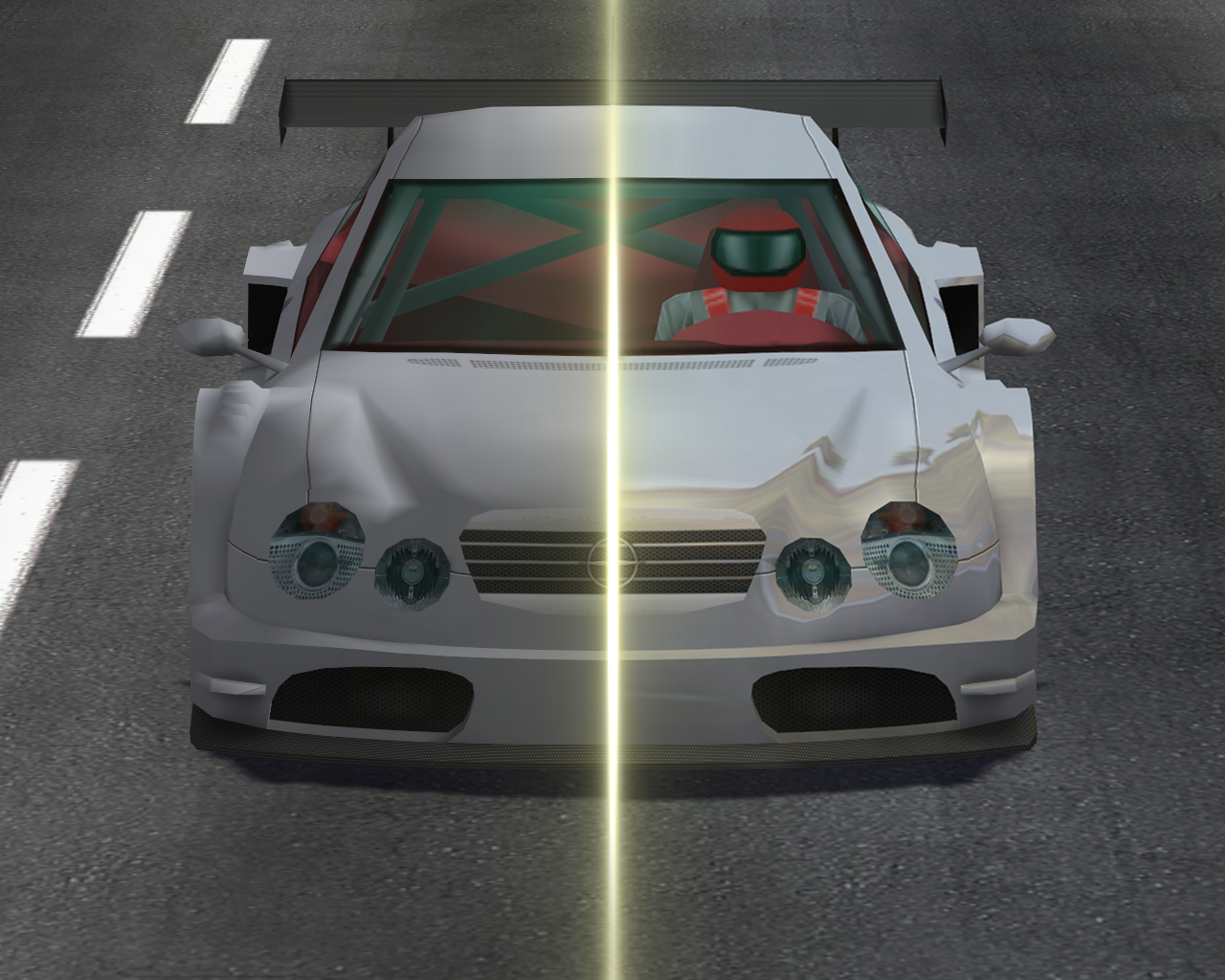
Comparison of the reflections system of TORCS 1.3.3 (left) and Speed Dreams 2.0 (right): Front view of a racing car split by a bright line; the right part shows more vivid reflections

TORCS (The Open Racing Car Simulator) is an open-source 3D car racing simulator available on Linux, FreeBSD, Mac OS X, AmigaOS 4, AROS, MorphOS and Microsoft Windows. TORCS was created by Eric Espié and Christophe Guionneau, but project development is now headed by Bernhard Wymann. It is written in C++ and is licensed under the GNU GPL. TORCS is designed to enable pre-programmed AI drivers to race against one another, while allowing the user to control a vehicle using either a keyboard, mouse, or wheel input.

== History ==
=== Development ===
Development of TORCS began in 1997 by Eric Espié and Christophe Guionneau as a 2D game called Racing Car Simulator (RCS). It was influenced by and based on RARS (Robot Auto Racing Simulator). When Espié and Guionneau acquired a 3dfx graphics card for game development, they made the first 3D version of the simulator with OpenGL and renamed it Open Racing Car Simulator (ORCS) so as not to be confused with the Revision Control System.

The early versions of ORCS did not include cars with engines, making the game a Soap Box Derby-style, downhill racing simulation. When engines and engine sounds were eventually added, the simulation was given its final name, TORCS, as the name seemed more relevant to automobiles given its similarity to the word torque.

Later, Guionneau added multiple camera angles during game-play. Guionneau developed much of the original graphics code in TORCS and eventually added texture mapping to give more detail to the cars. Espié then worked on piecing together and finalizing code for release.

=== Future goals ===
The current main developers of TORCS are Bernhard Wymann (project leader), Christos Dimitrakakis (simulation, sound, AI) and Andrew Sumner (graphics, tracks). Aside from bugfixes and maintenance of TORCS code, the next features planned include network multiplayer mode, improved physics engine, enhanced car interior detail, and replays.

== Reception and impact ==
In December 2000 CNN placed TORCS among the "Top 10 Linux games for the holidays". Linux Journal considered TORCS to be the best open source driving game in their October 18, 2007 issue, highlighting the ability for players to design their own cars, realistic graphics and vehicle handling. The game has gained substantial popularity; between 2000 and 2017, it was downloaded over 2.9 million times via SourceForge.net alone.

=== Competitions ===
The TORCS Racing Board hosts a competition on its website among players in the TORCS community. Unlike traditional network multiplayer events in which players compete in real-time on local network or Internet-connected clients simultaneously, the TORCS Racing Board is a competition between artificial intelligence "robots" developed and uploaded by users.

Faculty from the University of Würzburg and Politecnico di Milano host two AI competitions, the Simulated Car Racing Championship and the Demolition Derby Competition; the latter uses a patched TORCS server.

=== TORCS forks ===
TORCS has been forked into several projects, for example Speed Dreams, originally known as Torcs-NG.

=== Use in research ===
Due to its openness, modularity and extensibility, TORCS has been adopted as a base for many research projects; examples include automated computation of car setups, human-assisted algorithmic generation of tracks and the application of several computing techniques (e.g. genetic programming) to different aspects of robot driving. Since 2008, TORCS has also played an important role in various research fields within the IEEE Conference on Computational Intelligence and Games, where it appears as a base for 4 to 6 projects every year.

According to the TORCS FAQ the current version of TORCS should be cited as "B. Wymann, E. Espié, C. Guionneau, C. Dimitrakakis, R. Coulom, A. Sumner. TORCS: The Open Racing Car Simulator, vX.X.X, 20XX."

== See also ==
- List of open source games
- VDrift, another cross-platform, open source driving simulation
- X Motor Racing, TORCS compatible UDP interface
- Speed Dreams, TORCS fork under active development
