= VDrift =

Driving simulator

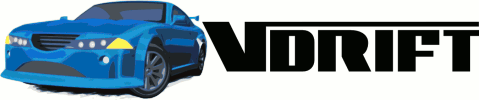
- Developers: Joe Venzon; Chris Guirl; Dick Maurer; Matthew Nicholson
- Release: March 29, 2005; 21 years ago
- Stable release: vdrift-2012-07-22 / July 22, 2012; 14 years ago
- Written in: Unknown rendering engine, with Vamos physics engine
- Platform: Linux, FreeBSD, OS X, Microsoft Windows
- Type: Single-player racing simulator
- License: GPLv3 (originally GPLv2)
- Website: https://vdrift.net/
- Repository: https://github.com/VDrift/

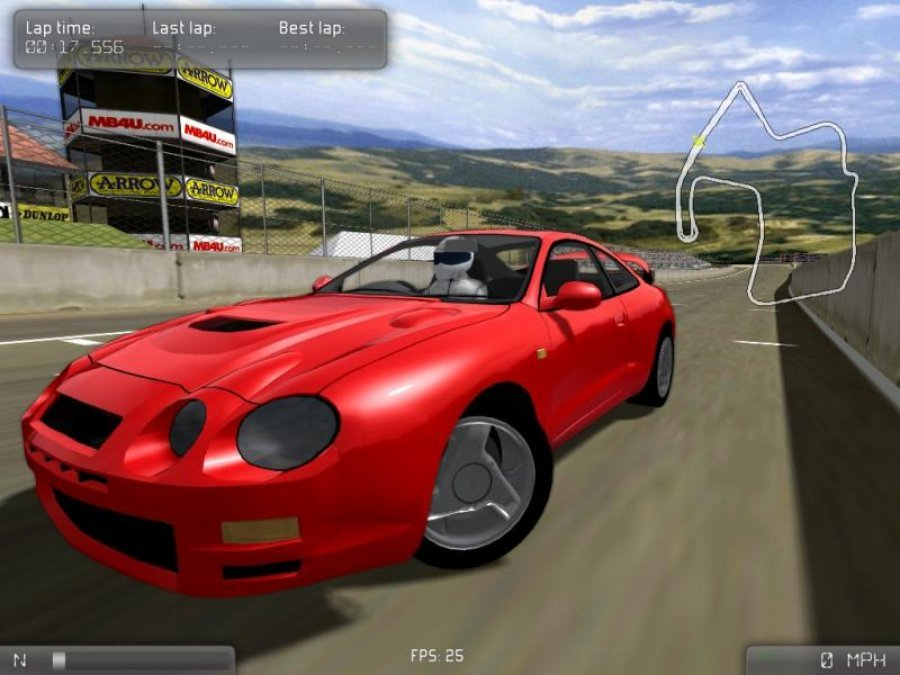
Screenshot of Vdrift (version from 2015)

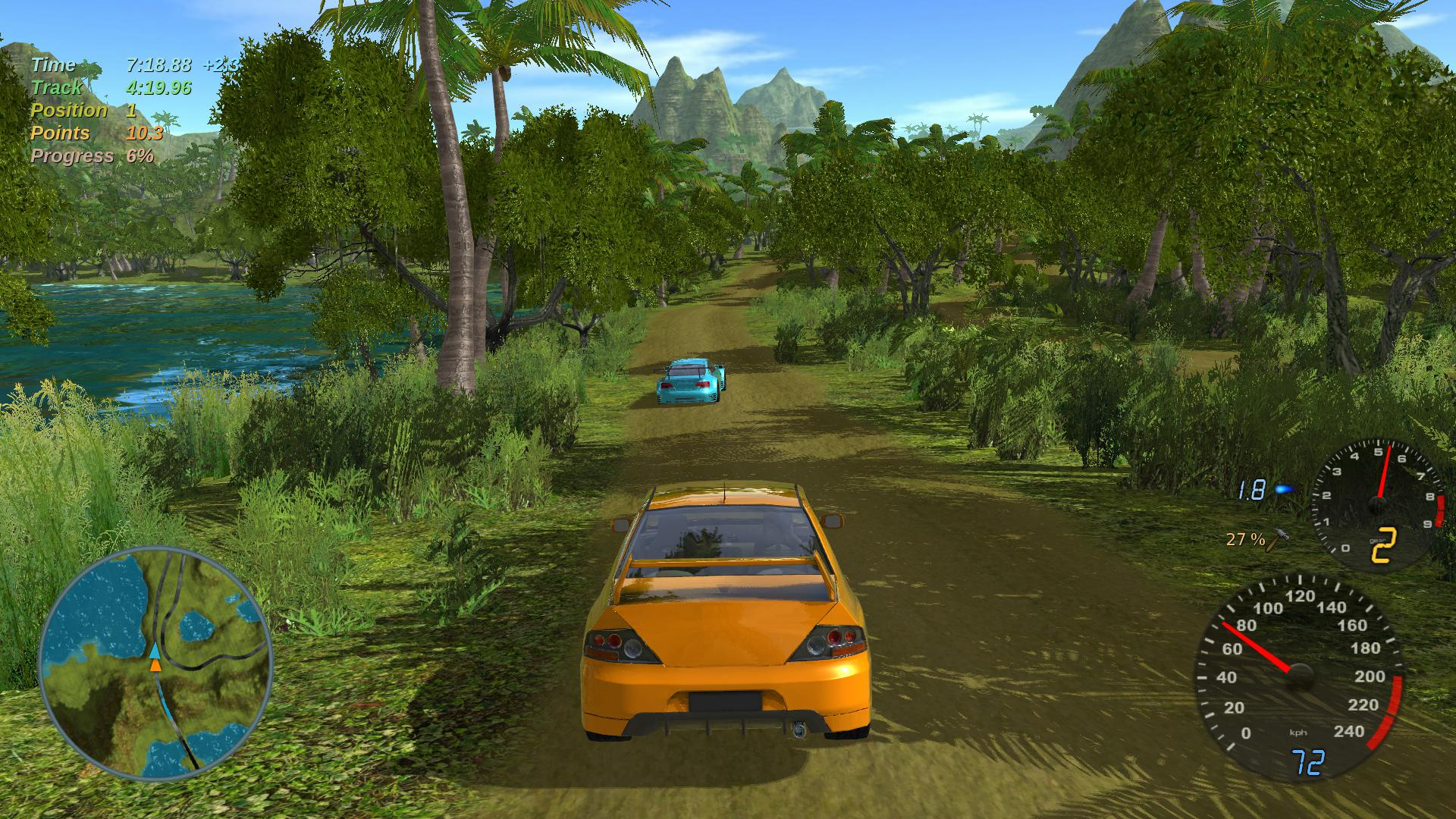
Screenshot of Stunt Rally, a derivative of Vdrift

VDrift is a cross-platform, free/open source driving simulation made with drift racing in mind. It is released under the GNU General Public License (GPL) v3. It is currently available for Linux, FreeBSD, Mac OS X and Microsoft Windows.

== Goals ==
The goals of the VDrift project are:

- To be a high-quality, open source racing simulation featuring enjoyable and challenging gameplay.
- To take advantage of modern computing hardware to accurately simulate vehicle physics in rich and immersive racing environments.
- To provide a platform for creative experimentation to a community of developers and artists.

== History ==
VDrift was created by Joe Venzon in early 2005. A fan of Gran Turismo, Joe had a lot of fun trying to drift in Gran Turismo 4, though he was disappointed with GT4's physics after loss of traction. Looking around online, the open source Vamos Automotive Simulator performed much better, although the graphics and features were minimal. Building around Vamos, using code adapted from his earlier 3D engine experiments, Joe created the first version of VDrift.

So far, every release has been a testing/development quality release. For this and other reasons, dates are used instead of version numbers.

The driving physics engine was later re-written from scratch but was inspired by and owes much to the Vamos physics engine.

Originally developed on a SourceForge repository, the project seems to have shifted around 2011 to a GitHub one.

== Features ==
This game is in the early stages of development but is already playable. Currently the game features:

- 45 tracks based on famous real-world tracks
- 39 cars based on real-world vehicles
- Realistic, simulation-grade driving physics
- Mouse/joystick/gamepad/wheel/keyboard support
- Fully modeled tracks, scenery and terrain
- Several different camera modes
- Basic replay system with Skip Forward/Skip Backward
- Fully customizable controls
- Joystick, mouse and keyboard input filtering
- Brake and reverse lights
- Driver aids: automatic shifting, traction control, anti-lock braking
- Experimental force feedback
- Race against up to 3 AI with variable difficulty
- Engine and road sounds

== Reception and impact ==
The game was reviewed between 2006 and 2009 by multiple websites.

The game became a quite popular downloadable freeware title and was downloaded between 2005 and May 2017 alone via SourceForge over 2.3 million times, Softpedia counted 58,000 downloads, and Softonic another 175,000 downloads in May 2017.

=== Derivatives ===
Due to the free and open source license of Vdrift forks and derivatives are possible and encouraged. Stunt Rally is an example which is based on VDrift and uses OGRE.

== See also ==
- List of open source games
- TORCS, another open source 3D car racing simulator.
