= Elona (video game) =

2007 video game

- Developer: Noa
- Platforms: Android, Microsoft Windows, IOS
- Release: August 31, 2007
- Genre: Roguelike
- Mode: Single-player

Elona (shorthand for Eternal League of Nefia) is a single-player, roguelike game developed by Japanese developer Noa; it was released in August, 2007.

== Gameplay ==
The game is set in a fantasy world called Irva, where the player can create a character by choosing from a selection of eleven races and ten classes to battle monsters, practice magic, perform music, or take on various other roles.

Unlike most roguelikes, the game's setting is an open-world environment and revolves around completing randomly-generated quests and exploring dungeons for higher-level rewards.

The game begins with the players' character surviving a disaster at sea in the north of Irva's northwestern continent, Tyris. North Tyris contains many towns and dungeons with randomly generated elements. These can be explored by the player as they deal with or avoid creatures, townsfolk, other adventurers, and the corrupting effects of a seasonal phenomenon called Etherwind. The player can take quests and make their character believe in one of several gods to enhance their skills and earn various bonuses.

=== Character creation ===
The playable races in Elona are the Yerles, Eulderna, Fairy, Dwarf, Juere, Elea, Snail, Lich, Goblin, Golem, and Mutant. It is possible to change a value in the configuration and play as special "debug" races, such as a god.

=== Online content ===
Elona allows players to create custom maps and content and then upload them to the server. These maps can be accessed via randomly spawning moon gates in town. It is recommended that players take caution when entering moon gates, as there may be no way back except death. Many moon gates contain a wide variety of bizarre ways to kill the player, ranging from cats that kill in a single hit to kamikaze monsters that set off a massive chain reaction of explosions when killed.

With the online setting enabled, players get notified server-wide of other participants' death messages and the manner in which they die, such as starving to death in a dungeon or being killed by a rock thrown by an old man.

== Development ==
The development of Elona began in 2006. Its premise was inspired by roguelikes such as Ancient Domains of Mystery (ADOM) and Angband. Noa had two other role-playing games in development at the time, Shade and Etherwind. It was programmed in the Hot Soup Processor (HSP) procedural language. Elona Shooter, a promotional Adobe Flash shooter game, was released in October 2009 on Kongregate.

There are many fan-made versions of Elona available, which continued support for the game after Noa ceased official development, such as ElonaPlus (stylized as Elona+) by Ano Inu and Omake_Overhaul_modify.

A mobile version of the game with optimized graphics was released on April 20, 2021. This version drew criticism from fans of the original game due to the exclusion or modification of ElonaPlus content as well as the inclusion of microtransactions.
