= Prismata =

- Developer: Lunarch Studios
- Designers: Elyot Grant, Will Ma, David Rhee, Shalev Ben David, and Alex Wice
- Artists: Dan Hunter; Stanley Lau
- Writer: Mike Fong
- Engine: Starling
- Platforms: Web browser, Microsoft Windows, OS X
- Genre: Strategy
- Modes: Single-player, multiplayer

Prismata is a hybrid strategy video game. It was released on Steam on March 8, 2018, as an early access game, following a successful Kickstarter campaign. The game has been free-to-play since September 2018. The game features a combination of mechanics from real-time strategy, turn-based strategy, and card games.

== Basic Two-Player Gameplay ==
Prismata is a turn-based, perfect information game. The game begins with the reveal of a "random set" of 5 or more units, randomly chosen from a list of about 100 units. Each turn, players may purchase units from the random set and the "base set", a set of 11 units available every game. Units may attack, block, produce gold or other resources, or have special abilities. The goal of the game is to destroy all of your opponents units by producing attack and using abilities.

== Campaign ==
Prismata's campaign is set in a science fiction universe where humanity has colonized other planets and lives alongside sentient machines. Years before the start of the game, there is a war between the humans and machines. The humans are assisted by both non-sentient robots and genetically engineered bionic animals. These are controlled by specially trained operatives called Swarmwielders. The Swarmwielders control their minions using a device called the Prismata Slate, which is the in-universe name for the game's user interface. At the time that the game opens, the humans and machines are at peace and Swarmwielders have been relegated to instructor and security roles. However, a rogue computer virus soon starts wreaking havoc across the planet...

Prismata Campaign
Episode	Levels	Release date
Outbreak	9	March 2018
Recombination	9	May 2018
Keystone	9	July 2018
Lockdown	9	TBA
Purge	9	TBA

== Development ==
Development began in late 2010 by several part-time students at MIT. Originally, a physical prototype game was built, titled MCDS, which featured many of the mechanics that would later make it into Prismata. The game later evolved through several digital prototypes and in 2011 a standalone application was constructed. In 2013, following the announcement of Hearthstone: Heroes of Warcraft at PAX East the three Canadian developers quit their PhD studies to begin work on Prismata full-time. On November 14, 2014, Lunarch Studios launched a Kickstarter campaign for 140,000 Canadian dollars. Prismata received a large amount of attention of social media attention after a post about the developers became the highest rated post ever on the popular Reddit board, /r/bestof. It received 100% funding at the end of the campaign with additional funds being raised through PayPal. As of September 27 2018, the game is free-to-play: the multiplayer content is available for free, while some single-player content and customizable cosmetics can be purchased.

== Reception ==
The development versions of the game have been well received. It is frequently referred to as a combination of StarCraft and Hearthstone. PCGamer referred to it as, "StarCraft without the RTS element" saying that "it does provide strategic depth without the necessity of mechanical skill." Comparisons have also been drawn to Magic: The Gathering and Dominion. Professional poker player, Michael McDonald is also an outspoken player of the game. It has also been placed on The Globe and Mail's "Top 10 Canadian crowdfunding campaigns of the year" list and it won a Curse award at PAX East 2015.
