= List of freeware video games =

This is a selected list of freeware video games implemented as traditional executable files that must be downloaded and installed. Freeware games are games that are released as freeware and can be downloaded and played, free of charge, for an unlimited amount of time.

This list does not include:

- Open-source games with fully free content (see List of free and open-source video games).
- Games that were previously sold commercially (see List of commercial video games released as freeware).
- Shareware or free-to-play games that require purchase for play time, game items, new content or features, or that rely on advertisements for profit (see Category:Shareware games and Category:Free-to-play video games).
- Browser games (see List of browser games).
- Mods: software that cannot be played as a stand-alone game (see Category:Video game mods).

== Games distributed as freeware ==
Freeware is often proprietary software as opposed to free software, meaning that the right to copy, modify, and distribute it is restricted in some way, as are these games in the following table, unless noted otherwise. Occasionally, their source code is made available, but nonetheless remains non-free, which this list may include.

Title	Original release date	Platforms affected	Notes
Ahriman's Prophecy	2004	Windows	A prequel to the Aveyond RPG series.
Alien Swarm	July 19, 2010	Windows	A top-down shooter from Valve used to test the Source 2010 beta.
America's Army	July 4, 2002	Windows	The official United States Army game. As a work of the United States federal government, it is in the public domain in the United States.
Anchorhead	1998		A horror interactive fiction game.
Ancient Domains of Mystery			A roguelike game (technically postcardware) by Thomas Biskup.
Astro Battle	2002	Windows	A top-down multi-directional shooter in which players design their own spacecraft and battle other players online.
Babbdi	December 22, 2022	Linux, macOS, Windows	An adventure game in which players attempt to leave a dystopian city.
Baldi's Basics in Education and Learning		Android, iOS, Linux, macOS, Windows	A puzzle horror game parodying 1990s educational games.
Barkley, Shut Up and Jam: Gaiden	January 21, 2008	Windows	A futuristic role-playing video game starring basketballer Charles Barkley.
Battleships Forever	2007	Windows	A real-time tactics game with a ship designer.
BMW M3 Challenge	September 2007	Windows	A BMW M3 car racing game.
Broken Sword 2.5: The Return of the Templars	September 28, 2008	Windows	A fan-made Broken Sword game.
BVE Trainsim		Windows	A railroad simulator created by Mackoy of Japan.
Cave Story	2004	Windows	A side-scrolling action-adventure game.
CellFactor: Revolution	May 2007	Windows	A single-player and multiplayer game that uses the Ageia PhysX engine.
Chicken Invaders		Windows	A space shooter by InterAction Studios.
Cho Ren Sha 68K	1997	Windows	A vertically scrolling shooter game.
Chzo Mythos			A set of four separate adventure games: 5 Days a Stranger, 7 Days a Skeptic, Trilby's Notes and 6 Days a Sacrifice by Ben Croshaw.
Cloud	2005	Windows	A third-person computer puzzle game based on weather and atmospheric aesthetics.
Continuum	2001	Windows	A top-down multiplayer video game.
A Date with Death	2023	Linux, macOS, Windows	A visual novel and dating sim.
Deadly Rooms of Death			A turn-based puzzle game available in two free versions: Architect's Edition and browser-based Flash version.
Digital: A Love Story	February 2010	Linux, macOS, Windows	A computer mystery/romance set "five minutes into the future of 1988". The game is released under a CC BY-NC-SA 3.0 license.
DinoHunters			An advertisement-supported first person shooter and machinima series created by Kuma Reality Games.
Dogfights: The Game			A combat flight simulator based on the History Channel series of the same name.
Doki Doki Literature Club!	September 22, 2017	Linux, macOS, Windows	A visual novel game developed by Team Salvato.
Dwarf Fortress	August 8, 2006	Linux, Windows	A real-time fantasy roguelike (technically donationware).
Eastside Hockey Manager	2001	Windows	A hockey manager game.
Elona			An open-world roguelike game.
Eternal Daughter	2002	Windows	A Castlevania-style action-adventure game.
Eversion	2008	Windows	A platform game.
Food Force	April 14, 2005	macOS, Windows	A game where the player must deliver food to places in which people are starving.
Freddy Fazbear's Pizzeria Simulator		Windows	
Future Pinball			A pinball simulation editor and game with many tables available.
Gate 88		Linux, macOS, Windows	An abstract top-down futuristic real-time strategy space combat simulator.
General		Windows	A strategy game with text interface.
Genetos	December 24, 2009	Windows	A scrolling shooter.
GridWars	2005	Windows	A clone of Geometry Wars.
Guns and Robots		Windows	A multiplayer third-person shooter.
Gunster		Windows	A discontinued multiplayer scrolling shooter.
Hero Core	May 1, 2010		A shooter game with Metroidvania elements, made by Daniel Remar.
Hydorah			A 2D Shoot 'em up similar to games such as Gradius. Was later released as a non-freeware title under the name Super Hydorah.
I Wanna Be the Guy	2007	Windows	A 2D platformer.
I'm O.K – A Murder Simulator	2006		A satirical side-scrolling shooter by Derek Yu.
Ib	February 2012	Windows	A horror/puzzle RPG Maker game.
Icy Tower		Windows	A tower-climbing platform game.
Iji	September 1, 2008	Windows	A platform-shooter by Daniel Remar.
Ikachan			An action-adventure game by Studio Pixel.
Inner Worlds	1996	DOS	A platformer where one plays as a woman that turns into a wolf. (Sleepless Software, 1996)
Jump 'n Bump	1998	DOS	A multiplayer battle game.
Knytt Stories	2007	Windows	A 2D exploration platformer with a built in editor by Nicklas Nygren.
La-Mulana	2006		A 2D platform game.
Liero	1998	DOS	A 2D side-scrolling shooting game for one or two players.
Little Fighter	1995	DOS	A beat 'em up fighting game.
Little Fighter 2	1999	Windows	The sequel to Little Fighter.
Liyla and the Shadows of War	2016	Android, iOS, Windows	A 2D side-scrolling platform game about the 2014 Gaza War.
The Looker	2022	Windows	A parody of the puzzle game The Witness
Mad Father	December 10, 2012	Windows	An RPG Maker game created by Miscreant's Room.
Maldita Castilla	2012		a platform game developed by Locomalito.
Monster Milktruck			A single-player online game using Google Earth technology.
Moon Whistle	1999	Windows	An RPG Maker game made by Kannazuki Sasuke.
Mugen	1999	Windows	A custom fighting game engine.
The Murder of Sonic the Hedgehog	2023	macOS, Windows	An official Sonic the Hedgehog visual novel released to celebrate April Fools' Day.
The Museum of Broken Memories		Windows	An adventure game by Jonas Kyratzes.
N	March 1, 2004	Linux, macOS, Windows	A ninja platform game.
Narbacular Drop	April 19, 2005	Windows	A 3D puzzle video game developed by Nuclear Monkey Software. It is the precursor to Valve's Portal.
Nitronic Rush	2011	Windows	A racing game.
Noctis			A space exploration simulator.
Off			A French RPG game about an entity known as "The Batter" and his quest to purify the world of OFF.
Off-Peak	2015		An adventure game set in a train station
One Night Trilogy		Windows	A series of three survival horror games.
osu!			A simulator of the rhythm video games Osu! Tatakae! Ouendan and Elite Beat Agents.
Perspective	December 12, 2012	Windows	A single-player puzzle game that includes aspects of a 2-D platformer where the player switches between a 2D and a 3D game environment.
Plasma Pong	Unreleased	macOS, Windows	An unfinished Pong game in which the ball is manipulated by a fluid dynamics environment.
Plobb!	2005	macOS, Windows	An Asteroids-like multidirectional shooter.
Project Reality	July 8, 2005	Windows	A modification of the tactical first-person shooter Battlefield 2 that became a standalone game in 2015.
Ragnarok Battle Offline			A 2D fighting game that is spin off of the MMO Ragnarok Online.
Samorost			A point-and-click adventure game.
A Second Face	December 23, 2008	Windows	A sci-fi adventure game.
Second Life			A virtual online world, created by its users. Developed by Linden Lab.
Seiklus	2003	Windows	An ambient single-player action-adventure game.
SimSig		Windows	A train simulation game based on real UK signalling systems.
Soldat		Windows	A 2D, fast-paced, action multi-player shooting game with many different game modes and weapon choices.
Space Combat			A 3D space simulator.
Space Funeral	2010	Windows	A horror and RPG parody game.
Space Tanks			A 2D/3D gravity game.
StepMania			A rhythm based game with online capability.
Synaesthete			A psychedelic rhythm shooter.
Synth	2007	Windows	An abstract procedurally rendered 3D game.
Syobon Action	2007	Windows	A Japanese game notorious for its difficulty.
Tag: The Power of Paint	2008	Windows	A 3D first-person action & puzzle game that uses paint to manipulate physics.
TAGAP: The Apocalyptic Game About Penguins		Windows	A 2D side-scrolling platform game.
Temporal	2008	Windows	A platform game involving time travel based puzzles.
Tinker		Windows	Also known as Microsoft Tinker, a 3D puzzle game.
Toribash			A 3D ragdoll fighting game in which the player controls every joint of their fighter.
Tough Guy: Fighting Titans			A fighting game available from Super Fighter Team.
Trackmania Nations	2006	Windows	A 3D racing game specially developed for the Electronic Sports World Cup by Nadeo.
Transcendence		Windows	A 2D space adventure game featuring extended moddability.
Vanguard Princess	June 2009	Windows	A dōjin 2D fighting game.
Vestaria Saga			A tactical role-playing game from Shouzou Kaga, the creator of the Fire Emblem series.
Vile: Exhumed	August 5, 2025	Windows	A 2025 indie horror game released as freeware after being banned from Steam. Released under a CC BY-NC-ND 4.0 license.
Visual Pinball	2000	Windows	A pinball simulation editor and game with many tables available.
Warmonger: Operation Downtown Destruction	November 28, 2007	Windows	An apocalyptic first-person shooter.
Warning Forever	December 30, 2003	Windows	A vertical shooter.
The WereCleaner	May 7, 2024	Android, iOS, macOS, Windows	A stealth-comedy game.
Within a Deep Forest	2006	Windows	A 2D physics and exploration game.
WolfQuest			A wildlife simulation game.
Yume Nikki	June 26, 2004	Windows	A relatively well-known "exploration" (walking simulator) game themed around dreams and nightmares with pixel graphics, which gained a cult following.
Zineth	2012	macOS, Windows	An indie third person skating game where one must traverse an environment with speed and agility.

== Freeware games with open-source code ==
These games have their source code published under a free and open-source license, but at least portions of their data remain proprietary or do not satisfy all the criteria as defined in The Free Software Definition to count as free software.

Title	Release date	Platforms affected	Engine license	Notes
AssaultCube	November 21, 2008	Android, Linux, macOS, Windows	zlib/libpng	A Counter-Strike-like first person shooter with low system requirements.
Celeste 64: Fragments of the Mountain	January 29, 2024	Linux, macOS, Windows	MIT	A 3D platformer released as a companion to Celeste.
Notrium	2003	Windows	GPLv3	A survival game.
Urban Terror	April 2, 2007	Linux, macOS, Windows	GPLv2	A free multiplayer shooter that can run on any Quake III Arena-compatible engine.

== Games formerly distributed as freeware ==
These games were first released as freeware before they were subsequently distributed as a commercial product. For a list of commercial games that were formerly distributed as freeware at a later point, see List of commercial video games no longer freely distributed.

Title	Release date	Platforms affected	Notes
Black Mesa	September 14, 2012	Windows	Originally Black Mesa: Source, a third-party remake of Half-Life. Originally a mod, it was first distributed in 2012 as a standalone product while still under development before it went commercial a year later.

== See also ==
- Open-source video game
- List of open-source video games
- List of free massively multiplayer online games
- List of free multiplayer online games
- List of free PC games
- List of commercial video games released as freeware
- List of commercial video games with later released source code
