= Temporal =

Temporal may refer to:

== Entertainment ==
- Temporal (Radio Tarifa album), 1997
- Temporal (Love Spirals Downwards album), 2000
- Temporal (Isis album), 2012
- Temporal (video game), a 2008 freeware platform and puzzle game
- Temporal (film), a 2022 Sri Lankan short film

== Philosophy ==
- Temporality
- Temporal actual entity, see Process and Reality § Whitehead's actual entities

== Other ==
- Temporal (anatomy), An alternative for lateral, in the head; towards the temporal bone
- Temporality (ecclesiastical), or temporal goods, secular possessions of the Church
- Temporal database

== See also ==
- Ephemeral
- Impermanence
- Temporal region (disambiguation)
