= Captain Forever =

- Designer(s): Jarrad Woods
- Platform(s): Adobe Flash, Windows
- Release: 2009 (Web), 2018 (Steam)
- Genre(s): Multidirectional shooter
- Mode(s): Single-player

Captain Forever is a multidirectional shooter video game by Australian developer Jarred "Farbs" Woods. The name comes from both its ongoing development process, with new versions of the game regularly being created and released, as well as its limitless gameplay experience.

There are four games in the series, the first of which is free and paying supporters may gain access to any future sequels released without being required to make any extra payments. In May 2018, the first three games in the series, namely Captain Forever, Captain Successor, and Captain Impostor, were re-built and bundled as Captain Forever Trilogy on Steam. All current Supporters are to be granted Steam Keys to redeem the Trilogy, and as of May 2018 the Supporter program stopped accepting new members.

A standalone "remix", Captain Forever Remix, was created by Pixelsaurus Games who worked in conjunction with Woods to bring the title to modern systems. Remix was released to Microsoft Windows, Mac OS X and Linux in March 2015.

== Gameplay ==
Captain Forever was inspired by the 2007 freeware game Battleships Forever, which itself drew inspiration from the 2003 game Warning Forever.

In each game in the Captain Forever series, with the exception of Captain Impostor, the player pilots a ship with the ability to be expanded by attaching 'modules' (such as lasers or boosters) gained from defeated enemies to a command module, represented by a box containing a broken heart. The goal in the game is to keep your ship alive for as long as possible. As the game progresses, stronger enemy ships (labeled according to letters from the NATO phonetic alphabet) arrive. Destroying stronger ships increases the Law (levels within the game), until Protectors (Peacekeepers in the original game) arrive to attack. The game effectively ends after the first Protector is destroyed (replacing the command module's broken heart with a complete one) but the player may continue accumulating parts indefinitely. If the player's ship is destroyed, it explodes, destroying all ships in the immediate area and clearing the area for the player to begin rebuilding their ship from scratch. The default background is a grid of green lines over a black background with a faint image of a pilot's face in the middle. The background can be changed, however, to an image taken by the player's webcam.

== Reception ==
Captain Forever won the Best Game award at China's first Independent Games Festival in 2009. Captain Forever was also named as one of the 1001 Video Games You Must Play Before You Die.

== Legacy ==
=== Sequels ===
Captain Successor: Launched for supporters in November 2009, as the original game was made freely available to all players. This new game introduces a variety of new weapons, propulsion and defensive modules, as well as more types of enemy ships.

Captain Impostor: Released in March 2010, but is only available to paying supporters. It introduced the Clone Drive which copies enemy designs entirely and cannot be constructed module by module.

Captain Jameson: A project that was intended to become a full-fledged RPG, it got scrapped in early 2013, but is still playable by Captain Forever supporters. The modern version of this is The Dawn Star.

The Dawn Star: Originally labeled "Captain Jameson Reboot", is a revision of the previous iteration. A commonly agreed origin of the name comes from a member page on the game's forums. The purpose is to further expand the game and to improve game mechanics and aesthetics.

- this was again renamed Captain Forever Universe and the beta is included in the trilogy on Steam

Captain Forever Trilogy: The bundle was released in May 2018 and consists of Forever, Successor, and Impostor. All three games were rebuilt and available on Steam. Additional module types were added to the game, such as angled shield modules and graphics were updated.

=== Captain Forever Remix ===
Captain Forever Remix adds a meta-game framed around Saturday morning cartoons.

The game follows Natalie Norberry, a schoolgirl that imagines herself as a cartoon character, Captain Forever, fighting to race to the edge of the Solar System against enemies set at her by her younger brother. The goal is to complete 10 stages as the player races to the end of the Solar System. The encounters at each stage are procedurally-generated, and should the player's core unit be destroyed, they must begin from the start. Each stage is completed by meeting a specific goal, such as destroying a ship of a given level (as assigned by the game).
