= Trap Adventure 2 =

2016 video game

- App icon
- Developer: Hiroyoshi Oshiba
- Publisher: Hiroyoshi Oshiba
- Engine: Clickteam Fusion 2.5
- Platform: iOS
- Release: June 29, 2016
- Genres: Platform, adventure, survival
- Mode: Single-player

Trap Adventure 2 is a 2D platform game made by Hiroyoshi Oshiba. The game is known for its very hard levels, with endless traps similar to Cat Mario. It was originally released in 2016 for iOS and gained popularity in 2018.

It is a sequel to Trap Adventure, a similarly difficult platform game released by the same developer in 2013.

== Gameplay ==
Trap Adventure 2 is a nightmarish version of the original Super Mario Bros, and has a similar gameplay to Shobon no Action. It is mostly a flip-screen game, but one part uses vertical scrolling. The game offers two modes: normal mode and last chance mode. In last chance mode, the player only has one life. An optional normal mode is available via in-app purchase. When bought, the player will have multiple lives and when they level up, they will get more lives. As the player runs and jumps into everything, a never-ending series of spikes, flames and other booby traps appear out of nowhere to kill the player, and once all lives are gone, it forces the player to start the game over again at the beginning with no checkpoints. The number of lives of players will increase as the player passes more levels of the game. Players have stated that the game is impossible to beat, although it has been beaten.

== Reception ==
Polygon described it as a "masocore" game in the vein of ultra hard platformers. Kotaku said the reason for Trap Adventure 2's sudden popularity was a video that was posted on Twitter in January 2018 that illustrates just how cruel and hilarious the game can be.

== Inspiration ==
This game was heavily inspired by the 1985 Nintendo Entertainment System game Super Mario Bros..
