= Chillingham (game) =

2004 audio game

Chillingham is an audio game for the PC designed for the blind and visually impaired. Created by Bavisoft and published 2004, Chillingham was part of the Game On exhibition showing at museums around the world. A sequel called Chillingham 2 has also been announced, but as of 2017 has not been published.
