= Battle Kid: Fortress of Peril =

2010 video game

- Developers: Sivak Games bit-games (version 2.0 co-production)
- Publishers: Retrozone (NES); Columbus Circle (FC); 8 Bit Legit (Xbox, Switch)
- Platforms: Nintendo Entertainment System, Xbox One, Nintendo Switch
- Release: NA: February 22, 2010; JP: October 18, 2018
- Genres: Platform, Metroidvania
- Mode: Single-player

Battle Kid: Fortress of Peril (Note: Known in Japan as Battle Kid: Kikenna Wana (バトルキッド 危険な罠, Batoru Kiddo: Kikenna Wana; lit. Battle Kid: A Perilous Trap)) is a platform game for the Nintendo Entertainment System released in February 2010 by American developer Sivak Games. It is published through Retrozone with the cover art designed by Larry Bundy Jr. Battle Kid is available for purchase on the Xbox store, the Nintendo Switch eShop, and as a game ROM or physical cartridge for the NES.

== Gameplay ==
A gameplay screenshot of an underwater area. The pink ball bounces back and forth on the bottom. The eyes shoot projectiles.

Battle Kid is very similar to I Wanna Be the Guy, an indie freeware game for the PC, in terms of the design of the main character and the projectile weapon he possesses, the trial-and-error difficulty, and instant death mechanics of all enemies and hazards. However, the similarities end here as the actual gameplay and control is much more in the likeness of Mega Man games on the NES and the boss fights at the end of each major stage. The main character, Timmy, can only be hit once before the player is greeted with a 'game over' screen, but there are infinite continues and the player will start over from the last save point. There are also keys which unlock different areas of the fortress and enhancement cards which give the player a number of different abilities to overcome obstacles. There are over 500 individual rooms, over 30 different enemy types, and multiple difficulty settings.

== Plot ==
Dr. Tina Byers, a scientist who works at Disch Corporation, receives a transmission about a group of unknown origin taking base and building a Supermech, a kind of robot that has many weapon systems at Fortress Il' Akab, a fortress once inhabited by a wizard race who planted monsters and traps inside. Fearing that the Supermech may be a threat, Dr. Byers informs Timmy about the transmission and introduces him to a prototype combat suit. Wearing the suit, Timmy goes out on his ship to stop the production of the Supermech.

== Releases ==
There have been three U.S. releases of Battle Kid: Fortress of Peril. The first one was a limited edition run of 33 copies for early pre-orders, game play testers and production staff, with each copy being uniquely numbered. February 2010's version 1.000 was the second, main, and currently most common release. A third release of version 1.100 was released on July 2, 2010.

The main differences between the 1.0 and 1.1 releases of Battle Kid was the fixing of a glitch discovered in the 1.0 version of the game. This allowed the player to become invincible, therefore being able to beat the game with ease. Also fixed was a sound effect and the letters "D" and "V" of the game's font, which were sometimes confused with "O" and "U" respectively. Exclusive to the 1.100 release as well is an extra level originally showcased at the 2010 ScrewAttack Gaming Convention which can be accessed by typing "SGCLEVEL" into the password screen.

The cover art and cartridge label for 1.1 were also totally redesigned and re-colored by "Guru Larry" Bundy Jr. He had made a pencil sketch of the original cover, but did not have enough time to finish off the piece personally, and therefore it was handled by Sivak.

=== Japanese release ===
A modified translated version of Battle Kid was released for the Family Computer in Japan in October 2018 under the name of Battle Kid: A Perilous Trap.

== Reception ==
=== Game Grumps ===
The YouTube channel Game Grumps featured Battle Kid in a 2014 Let's Play, resulting in one of the most popular moments from the channel's history. In the last episode, a furious Arin Hanson is unable to beat the game's first boss, the Lotus Guardian, and improvises nonsensical sentences aloud to try and focus as co-host Dan Avidan laughs along. At the episode's culmination, Arin decides to have one more attempt, but accidentally quits the game, resulting in a final outburst. The official animated version of this episode has reached 12 million views on YouTube as of 2024. A segment in a Game Grumps live show has Arin attempting to finally beat the game's first boss, and succeeding.

== Legacy ==
Battle Kid 2: Mountain of Torment was released on December 15, 2012 by developer Sivak Games. New features have been covered, such as the following: new block types of ice, conveyors, and sludge; Wall Grip upgrade; the in-game death counter; and the intro stage.
