= Moon Whistle =

1999 video game

- Developer: Kōichirō Takaki
- Publisher: Independent
- Designers: Kōichirō Takaki; Saia Hyōseki (music)
- Engine: RPG Maker 95
- Platform: Windows
- Release: 1999
- Genre: Role-playing video game
- Mode: Single player

Moon Whistle (ムーンホイッスル, Mūn Hoissuru) is a Japanese-language freeware role-playing video game created with RPG Maker 95. Mainly made by Kōichirō Takaki (高木 幸一郎), also known as Kannazuki Sasuke (神無月サスケ), this game involves an adventure of a five-year-old kindergartner in a pseudo-Japanese city of the 1980s and 1990s.

It won an ASCII-held monthly contest, Internet Contest Park, two popular votes on Internet Contest Park, reaching respectively #1 and #8, and received an honorable mention in the ASCII Entertainment Software Contest.

== Overview ==
Moon Whistle is a story-based role-playing game, featuring sprite characters and objects, 2D exploring maps, cutscene dialogues, and combats ― conventional fares of old-school role-playing games as a whole. The game's prominent feature is its setting; contrary to a regular save-the-world plot in a high fantasy setting, the story of Moon Whistle unfolds mostly in a fictionalized modern Japanese city completed with original chip sets and character sprites. Much like the Mother series, most of main characters are preteen children. Their wielding weapons are everyday items and toys, they wear casual clothing or mascot costumes instead of a piece of armor, and monsters they fight include weird ones like burner/tripod monsters and iron frogs. The entire music was composed for the game by the pseudonym Saia Hyōseki (氷石彩亜).

Basically its story revolves around a kindergarten-aged boy, Zenon (ぜのん), and his friends, while it also focuses on topics like alienation mainly from the viewpoint of another lead character, X Ranger (Xレンジャー). Zenon generally does not speak lines but with a few exceptions. The whole story is divided into over 20 small episodes, every of which takes place in a day. Once the player is finished with a day, the next day featured continues.

== Gameplay ==
While unique in appearances, its gameplay is a customary one for a role-playing game; buying items in shops, equipping gadgets, random encounters, boss battles, leveling up, explorations, communicating with townspeople, and so forth. Its battle system is the default one of RPG Tsukūru 95 so that battles are operated in a front-view, turn-based fashion that resembles to that of SNES Dragon Quest games.

== Plot ==
Set in Motomachi Town (もとまちタウン), a fictional 1980s Japanese suburb, the story begins on Zenon's first school day following spring vacation. After school, he goes to a hill in the town together with Narumi looking for X-Ranger, a superhero in a children's TV show, who allegedly appears in Motomachi Town for some reason. After meeting a man in X-Ranger's costume, Zenon and Narumi fight a bad monster in the hill in hope of helping him. Thanks to this, Zenon becomes popular enough with school-age children to be invited to their "secret base" to join them.

Later Zenon and the gang happen to visit X-Ranger's hideout, and touch the panel of a giant machine sitting in there without his consent. Then they find themselves in a strange town, where they save Zeta (ツェータ) from Hart (ハルト), a spoiled mean child, and are befriended with him. Once prohibited to use the machine by X-Ranger, later they are allowed to go between two cities. A cat-like creature, Max (マックス), is also acquainted with them.

After some events, Zeta notices that Zenon's town is very similar to his, Motomachi City (もとまちシティ), and questions X-Ranger on it. He reveals that he is a 19-year-old Zenon who came from the future (Motomachi City) to his past (Motomachi Town) by a time machine in order to recover hopes and dreams of people. Eidos (エイドス), a Priest of Time (時の神官), later confronts X-Ranger claiming that X-Ranger's action causes the timeline to shift, as well as Max, who, being also a Priest of Time, helped X-Ranger complete a time machine.

In autumn, a new toy Rocket Monster (ロケットモンスター) has become a fad among kids in Motomachi City. However, suddenly one of them goes berserk, and it results in severe criticism to the product by parents. Zenon and his friends find out that it was plotted by Hart's father, who intended to damage the profits of his rival firm by harming repute of their product, Rocket Monster. In consequence, Rocket Monster has succeeded in recovering its status.

After the next year began, people in Motomachi City suddenly all got melancholic. Zenon and his friends investigate the case, and fight with X Ranger's shadow. After the battle, X-Ranger realizes that this world is not real and he in reality is presumably unconscious for an attempted suicide. Also, this dream world was shared by Hart in reality. He acquires in his dream immense power, and challenges Zenon and Zeta again, only to be defeated. Out of grudge, he destroys Sphere (スフィア), enshrined in the Realm of Time (時の神殿), which maintains the order of worlds, while the master of the Shrine, Volatilis (ボラティル), restores it in exchange for his life. Despite this, still Sphere was split in two.

Since Sphere was broken, Zenon was no longer able to access to the future. X-Ranger decides to return to his reality, and together with Zenon, visits the Realm of Time to challenge the Final Trial, in which X-Ranger faces his surrounding problems. At the end of the Trial, Volatilis' spirit awaits to kill Zenon so as to extinguish the world of the dream. With the help of X Ranger, however, Zenon and his friends defeat Volatilis. After this, X-Ranger and Max return to each place. In March, Zenon and Narumi attend the graduation ceremony of their kindergarten.

== Off-shoots ==
As a spin-off of Moon Whistle, Another Moon Whistle: Kuzureteku Nyūdōgumo (アナザームーンホイッスル くずれてく入道雲; lit. "Another Moon Whistle: Collapsing Cumulonimbus") was released in April 2003, which, at that time, was developed by the use of RPG Tsukūru 2000.

Boku no Sumu Machi (ぼくのすむまち; literally; "A town where I live") was the omnibus of six short RPGs accomplished with RPG Tsukūru for Mobile and provided by Enterbrain via NTT Docomo's i-appli service. The sixth episode of it featured X Ranger, Zenon, and Narumi.
