= Hero Core =

2010 video game

- Developer: Daniel Remar
- Release: May 3, 2010
- Genres: Shooter, Metroidvania

Hero Core is a freeware shooter game created by Daniel Remar, the developer of Iji. The game was released on 3 May 2010. It was created in Game Maker Studio, with music composed by Brother Android. It is a sequel to the game Hero. Around 2013 the source code of the game was made available to the public.

== Gameplay ==
Hero Core is a "Metroidvania" styled shooter, where the player controls Flip Hero, and using two fire buttons, navigates his way through Cruiser Tetron's asteroid base. The ultimate goal of Hero Core is to get to the center of the asteroid base, and defeat the Machine Warlord, Cruiser Tetron.

== Plot ==
The game's plot concerns Flip Hero, a robot who has turned on his former master, Cruiser Tetron, and has been given the task of destroying Tetron in order to save Earth. Every time Flip Hero succeeds in defeating his foe, Tetron's robotic minions rebuild him, locking them in constant battle. The events of Hero Core portray the end of this cycle. Although the game briefly explores the relationship between master and servant turned foes, these examinations are fleeting because the game is primarily focused on gameplay rather than plot.

Players may either attempt to fight Cruiser Tetron immediately after starting the game or explore the asteroid base, fighting powerful enemy bosses and collecting items to improve their chances of success against Tetron. If the player can find all 10 secret computers in the base and defeat Tetron, it triggers an ending in which Tetron and his minions are permanently obliterated in an explosion caused by Flip Hero.
