= Farbs =

Independent video game developer

Farbs (Jarrad Woods)
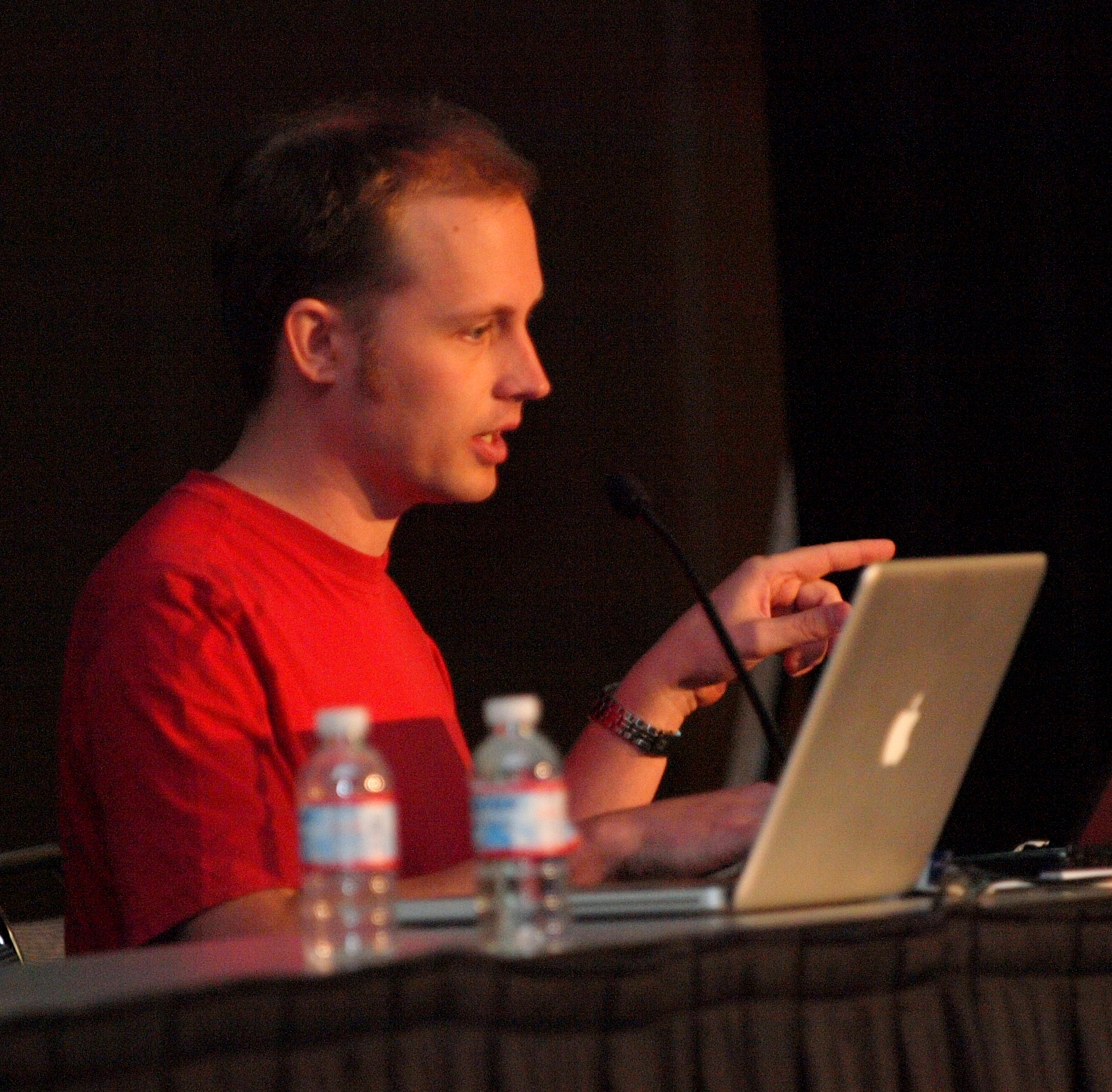
- Jarrad Woods (Farbs) at the Game Developers Conference in 2010
- Born: 1979 (age 46–47); Canberra, Australia
- Occupations: Independent game developer, Farbs.org

Farbs is the pseudonym of Jarrad Woods, an indie game developer who gained media attention when he quit his job at gaming firm 2K Australia using a video game. When asked in an interview where the idea had come from to quit via video game, Woods stated "At the time there were a lot of articles touting indie games as a form of expression, and I hate writing so I wanted to express my goodbye to the team in some other way. I had planned to leave for a few months, but the message was more spontaneous".

== Education ==
Farbs studied at the Academy of Interactive Entertainment in Canberra, Australia.

== Games ==
After eight years in commercial game design, Farbs started creating independent projects as a sideline in 2006.

Farbs has created several games including Polychromatic Funk Monkey, Fishie Fishie, ROM CHECK FAIL, Captain Forever and most recently, Captain Jameson. He also contributed work to Card Hunter.

== ROM CHECK FAIL ==
ROM CHECK FAIL was created for and won the 2008 Video Game Name Generator competition run by Derek Yu's site The Independent Gaming Source.

It went on to be listed in Gamasutra's top 5 indie games of 2008. Farbs presented ROM CHECK FAIL at the 2009 Experimental Gameplay Workshop, run by Jonathan Blow.

Following interest from the art community it was, or is to be, included in a number of exhibitions such as at the Powerhouse Museum, Finland's ManseDanse09 and Spain's Intermediae.

In 2011 Farbs made the Python source code of ROM CHECK FAIL freely available under a public domain like license.

== Captain Forever ==
Captain Forever is Farbs' most recent release, for which he won the Best Game award at the 2009 China Independent Games Festival.
