= A Second Face =

2008 video game

- Developer(s): Jospin Le Woltaire
- Series: A Second Face
- Engine: Adventure Game Studio
- Platform(s): Windows
- Release: December 23, 2008
- Genre(s): Point-and-click adventure

A Second Face is an independently produced adventure game that was created by German developer Jospin Le Woltaire in 2008 and released as freeware. It contains elements of fantasy but also science-fiction, however it also unifies them with elements of classic Cyberpunk and overtones of Enlightenment thought.

== Plot ==
The story is set on a tide locked planet. The sun-facing side is inhabited by the Strefis, the illuminated ones, while the dark side is populated by the Ugeltz, the people of night. No Ugeltz has ever seen a Strefis however each civilisation remembers the other, in legends. Ugk, the sovereign of the dark realm, has summoned his two sons Rabokk and Torg to send them on a quest that solves the energy problem of the dark side. The dark society depends on a substance called Margin, that is the only energy source and also the main currency of the realm. This substance is running out, because it can't be harvested any longer. Ugk hopes to find a solution for this problem by looking for the legendary realm of light, which could be a new energy source. He offers his position to the son who will succeed in finding the Realm of Light.

== History ==
A Second Face was scripted in Adventure Game Studio, with puzzles invented during the scripting process. Le Woltaire improvised much of this, starting with some backgrounds and characters until he got ideas for the plot and puzzles. Then the main cut-scenes were written to model the basic plot structure, and then the game was developed non-linearly. "Drawing, CAD-modelling, dramaturgy and scripting were mixed together which was a good way for me to make things grow together."

Character design began with a charcoal sketch, then coloured with watercolours. These were scanned and reduced in size to make the characters more detailed. Locations were also sketched, then used as a background reference for 3D-CAD models. These were then digitally edited to match the tone and style of the characters. Characters and locations were hand animated with photo editing software, and limited to six frames to make a compromise between economy and fluid motion.

Le Woltaire was influenced by a city map of ancient Babylonia for the design for City of Ugeltz.

== Gameplay ==
The plot develops with cinematic cutscenes and gameplay, controlled with a verb coin interface and an inventory-based action system that follows the tradition of classic point and click games. A characteristic text box makes open dialogues with other game figures possible when a single word is entered.

== Awards ==
A Second Face received 15 nominations for the 2008 AGS Awards. It won a total of three, namely "Best Game Created with AGS", "Best Original Story" and "Best Backgrounds".

== See also ==
- List of freeware games
