= I Wanna Be the Guy =

2007 platform video game

I Wanna Be the Guy: The Movie: The Game
- The title screen.
- Designer: Michael "Kayin" O'Reilly
- Programmer: Michael "Kayin" O'Reilly
- Engine: Multimedia Fusion 2
- Platform: Windows
- Release: October 2007
- Genre: Platform
- Mode: Single-player

I Wanna Be the Guy: The Movie: The Game, commonly called I Wanna Be the Guy and abbreviated to IWBTG, is a freeware platform game created by Michael "Kayin" O'Reilly for Microsoft Windows using Multimedia Fusion 2. First released in October 2007, the game's last official update came in February 2008, though its source code was released by Kayin in November 2011 and a remastered edition was released in December 2020. IWBTG has unusually difficult platforming elements, unorthodox level design, and uses sound effects, characters, and music from many other games.

== Gameplay ==
Screenshot of the first level

The player controls "The Kid". The controls are limited to left/right movement, jumping, double-jumping, and shooting. IWBTG is made up of several stages split into many screens, which are mostly pastiches of Nintendo Entertainment System games, such as Tetris, Ghosts 'n Goblins, The Legend of Zelda, Super Mario Bros., Castlevania, Mega Man, and Metroid. At the end of each stage, an oversized boss must be defeated to progress. They are:

- Mike Tyson (from Punch-Out!!)
- Mecha Birdo
- Dracula
- Kraidgief, a mix of Kraid (from the Metroid series) and Zangief (from the Street Fighter series)
- Mother Brain (from the Metroid series)
- Bowser, Wart, and Dr. Wily in the Koopa Clown Car
- A mix between the Mecha Dragon from Mega Man 2 and the Yellow Devil from Mega Man and Mega Man 3

They are adapted from classic games, mostly platformers, but their behavior and appearance have been modified and enhanced for IWBTG. The final boss, The Guy, is unique to IWBTG. The game parodies many 8-bit and 16-bit era video games, such as the frequent use of references and sound effects from the Nintendo game Mario Paint.

IWBTG is known for its extreme, intentionally unfair difficulty. Most of the landscape is engineered specifically to kill the player character. Alongside a traditional range of recognizable dangers, such as spikes and pits, there are many less obvious threats as well, most of which are all but impossible to avoid without either previous knowledge or trial and error (such as Tetris pieces and "Delicious Fruit", which can fall downwards, upwards, or sideways). The Kid always dies with a single hit, at which point he explodes into a mass of blood. Although each death results in a "Game Over", the player is allowed an infinite number of attempts. From the starting screen, there are four different ways to progress; all of them ultimately lead to the same warp screen which returns to the first screen. Thus, to complete the game, the first six bosses along each path must be defeated before the warp screen will allow the player to access the final area.

The game has four difficulty settings: "Medium", "Hard", "Very Hard", and "Impossible", with "Hard" considered to be the "normal difficulty". The only difference in gameplay between the difficulty settings is the number of save points available throughout the game, with 62 in Medium mode, 41 in Hard mode, 22 in Very Hard mode, and none at all in Impossible mode. Also, while playing on Medium mode, The Kid's hair has a pink bow in it, and any save points exclusive to Medium difficulty are labeled "WUSS" instead of "SAVE", a design decision the creator would later regret.

== Plot ==
Similar to many of its parodies, IWBTG displays a simple, straightforward plot with light impact on its gameplay.

The player controls "The Kid", who is on a mission to become "The Guy". The entirety of the plot is given in a message during the opening credits, a parody of bad Japanese translations and broken English in early NES games.

At the end, The Kid reaches The Guy, who reveals that he not only killed "Former Grandfather The Guy", but that he is also "The Father" to The Kid. A battle between the two takes place ending with The Kid becoming "The New Guy".

== Development ==
Kayin describes the game as "a sardonic love letter to the halcyon days of early American video gaming, packaged as a nail-rippingly difficult platform adventure". The inspiration came from a challenging Japanese Flash game on 2channel called The Big Adventure of Owata's Life, which Kayin played and thought he could outdo due to it being incomplete at the time.

On November 9, 2011, Kayin released the source code of the game under his own software license (forbidding new content), so that the game's community would be able to create fixes and patches.

== Reception ==
In "Critical games: Critical design in independent games", Lindsay Grace describes the game as one that critiques the logic and illogic of platform games in a way that questions the underlying assumptions of the genre, highlighting how jumping into a sword kills the protagonist instead of adding the sword to their inventory. Shaun Prescott similarly describes it as a self-critiquing game, noting that it "subverts the learning process of games by constantly breaking the rules."

The game has been categorized as "masocore", a descriptor for games with intentionally unfair design.

== Legacy ==
"The Kid" is an unlockable secret character in Super Meat Boy (2010). He also appears as an assist character in Fraymakers (2023).

=== Prequel ===
Two months after the release of IWBTG, Kayin announced a prequel titled I Wanna Save the Kids. IWSTK features "The Kid" escorting children back to their home. On the way, The Kid has to save these kids and himself from various dangers, as well as bringing them to the next level. The game closely parallels the classic computer game Lemmings, while still maintaining the notorious difficulty of IWBTG. The game is no longer in development, though a demo is available.

=== Sequel ===
After the success of fighting game competitor Ari "Floe" Weintraub streaming his playthroughs of IWBTG and multiple fan games, Kayin announced a sequel on June 26, 2012 titled I Wanna Be the Guy: Gaiden. Originally planned as an episodic series (though only one episode was released), IWBTG:G has "The Lad" trying to find "The Kid" after his ascent to Guy-dom. The game was first featured in the 2012 iteration of the Evolution Fighting Game Tournament with Floe playing.

=== Remaster ===
On December 22, 2020, a small group of fans remastered the game using the Yuuutu community fan game engine and Game Maker 8. The remaster was acknowledged by Kayin himself, citing it as a "best case scenario" and a "perfect package for anyone who wants to play IWBTG who isn't some super specific game 'research' type". The remaster is intended to make the game more accessible by removing the compatibility issues and frequent crashing caused by running the original game in newer Windows versions.

=== Fan games ===
Thousands of fan games based on IWBTG have been developed, including I Wanna Be the Boshy, which is frequently played at Games Done Quick events. Others include I Wanna Be the Fangame, developed by Tijitdamijit, one of the first players to beat IWBTG on "Impossible" difficulty, and I Wanna Run the Marathon, developed specifically for a marathon of similar games. A level editor named I Wanna Maker has also been released on Steam allowing free creation of IWBTG inspired levels.

== See also ==
- Battle Kid: Fortress of Peril
- Kaizo
- Syobon Action
