= Plobb! =

2005 video game

Plobb!'
- Screenshot game intro
- Developer(s): Nothing
- Designer(s): Bastiaan van Rooden, Nothing
- Platform(s): Windows 98/ME/2000/Vista/7; Mac OS X
- Release: Windows: 2005; Mac OS X: 2007
- Genre(s): Shoot 'em up
- Mode(s): Single Player

Plobb! is a single-player 2D freeware game developed with BlitzMax. The game involves the player guiding the small blob-shaped main character named "Plobb" around the screen where he is attacked by enemy bubbles. The aim is to eliminate the bubbles and finally also the arch-enemy in order to win the game and regain Plobb's freedom.

The game was created as a research project by Bastiaan van Rooden from Nothing Inc., Switzerland, which develops other freeware games but also advergames among other products. It is available as a stand-alone offline game for download free of charge. First launched in 2005, the game was only available for Windows while a version compatible with Mac OS X was developed in 2007. The game is distributed via download from the website of Nothing Inc.

== Gameplay ==
An introduction tells the story of Plobb's captivation by his arch-enemy the Evil Motts of Psodor. In order to escape from Evil Motts' Castle of Nightmares Plobb has, by spitting shots, to fight and eliminate the enemy bubbles that sap his energy.

The game-play structure follows those of classic shoot 'em ups of the 80s, also known as Golden Age of Arcade Games, and resembles first and foremost the game-play of Asteroids. It follows a simple and intuitive game-play pattern. The player, acting by the avatar Plobb throughout the game has to navigate around the bubbles that come crossing the screen and to aim shots at them by spitting in their direction. The player navigates Plobb by placing the cursor in the direction of or directly on the target towards which Plobb will then move to and upon left mouse click also will emit shots. The speed with which Plobb moves increases with the distance of the cursor to the actual position of Plobb on the screen. The bubbles differ in size and react to being shot at by dividing into two smaller bubbles until disappearing completely. If Plobb is touched by an enemy bubble he will lose energy.

The play is structured in 5 worlds with 5 levels each with the final fight between Plobb and Evil Motts on a separate last level.

Design elements used in the Plobb! game

== Critical reception ==
Although kept simply structured, the game design uses colors and shapes to the effect of creating candy store aesthetics. The generally round and colorful design can be considered a distinct characteristic of the Plobb! game and an original game design concept.
