= The Big Adventure of Owata's Life =

Jinsei Owata no Daibōken
- Developer: King
- Publisher: King (free release)
- Engine: Adobe Flash
- Platform: Web browser
- Genres: Action; platformer
- Mode: Single-player

Jinsei Owata no Daibōken (Japanese: 人生オワタの大冒険, lit. "The Great Adventure of 'My Life Is Over'") is a Japanese browser-based platform game developed by the independent creator King and released for free online as an Adobe Flash game in the late 2000s. The game features the 2channel (2ch) ASCII art character Jinsei Owata (人生ｵﾜﾀ ＼(^o^)／) as its protagonist and became known for dense "trial-and-error" level design with numerous instant-death traps.

A sequel, Jinsei Owata no Daibōken 2 (人生ｵﾜﾀの大冒険2), was released on 15 August 2020, shortly before Adobe Flash Player support ended in late 2020. Following the end of Flash support, the games were later made playable again via the open-source Flash emulator Ruffle and were re-published on King's website in November 2023.

== Gameplay ==
Gameplay screenshot

Jinsei Owata no Daibōken is a side-scrolling platform game in which the player controls Jinsei Owata—commonly represented by the emoticon "＼(^o^)／"—through stages constructed largely from ASCII art, with the goal of reaching the end while avoiding traps that typically kill the character in a single hit. The player's basic actions are movement, jumping, and firing a forward projectile (the "Owata Buster"). Frequent deaths are expected, and the game encourages repeated attempts via fast restarts (a retry function).

The sequel retains the same core controls and structure while thematically framing its setting around the impending end of Flash content; contemporary coverage described the sequel as taking place in a disappearing world tied to the shutdown of Flash support.

== Development and release ==
According to interviews with King published in Japanese media, the project originated from King's familiarity with 2channel ASCII art culture and the Jinsei Owata character, and he began developing the game while a university student as part of learning and practicing Flash development. Version logs archived by the Flashpoint preservation project list early public releases in January 2007 and subsequent updates during 2007.

Japanese coverage in 2010 reported that the game was released as a "complete version" in September 2009, and that it later included additional stages referencing I Wanna Be the Guy.

=== Jinsei Owata no Daibōken 2 ===
On 15 August 2020, King released Jinsei Owata no Daibōken 2 for free on his website, with multiple outlets highlighting its release as one of the last notable new Flash games before the end of Flash support. The sequel was widely framed as explicitly referencing Flash's impending discontinuation, including in feature coverage by Denfaminicogamer.

=== Removal and re-release via Ruffle ===
After Flash Player support ended at the end of 2020, playing Flash games in modern browsers became difficult without emulation. On 19 November 2023, Japanese outlet AUTOMATON reported that King re-published Jinsei Owata no Daibōken and its sequel on his website using the open-source Flash emulator Ruffle, making the games playable again in a browser environment. Denfaminicogamer similarly noted that the re-release relied on Ruffle for browser playback.

== Reception ==
The series became known in Japanese internet culture for its extreme difficulty and frequent "instant-death" surprises, and it is often discussed as a representative example of Flash-era "die-and-retry" action games.

In 2020, the Suntory coffee brand Craft Boss released a promotional web video reflecting on the history of Flash culture; contemporary reporting noted that the video referenced multiple Flash-era internet icons, including Jinsei Owata.

== Legacy and influence ==
Japanese outlet GetNews reported in 2010 that Michael "Kayin" O'Reilly, creator of I Wanna Be the Guy, sent a message to King thanking him and stating that O'Reilly had been inspired by Jinsei Owata no Daibōken. Denfaminicogamer's 2020 feature on the sequel also discussed the game's ongoing influence and noted continued interest in the series around the end of the Flash era.

The game has also been referenced in academic writing discussing Flash-era online game culture; a 2022 article on Flash and online media history cited King's Jinsei Owata no Daibōken (2007) among notable Flash works and provided the official URL.

== See also ==
- Syobon Action – 2007 video game
