= Game On (exhibition) =

Exhibition featuring historic video games

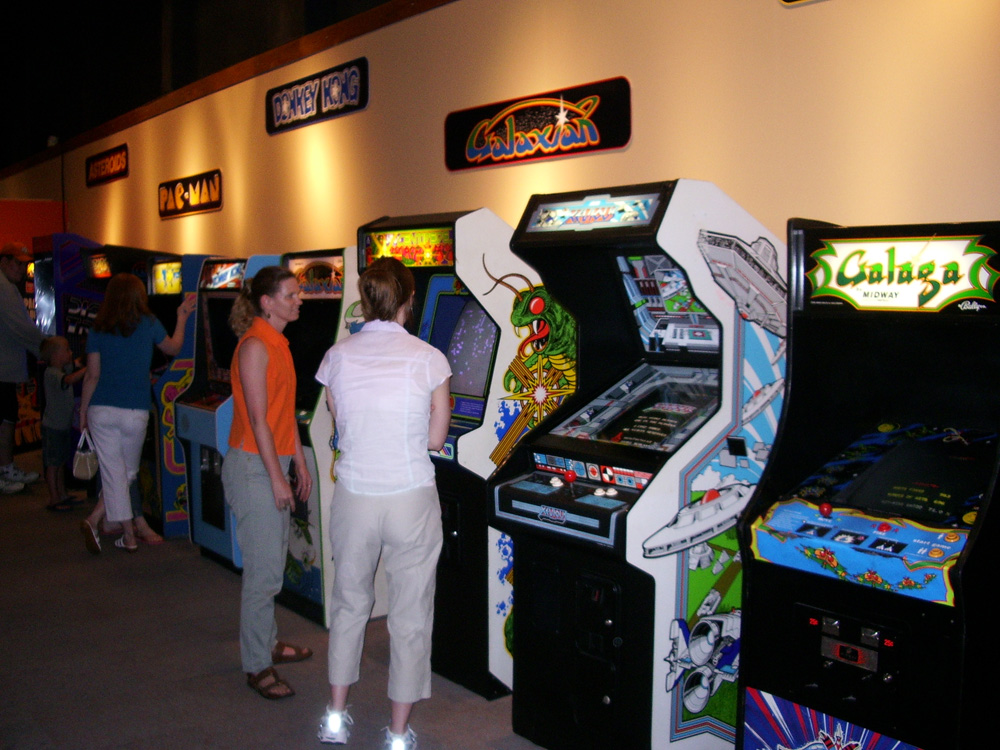
Part of the 2006 exhibition at the Pacific Science Center in Seattle

Game On is a touring exhibition on the history and culture of computer games. The exhibition was first shown at the Barbican Centre in London in 2002, and has since been exhibited by Barbican International Enterprises to over 20 countries, where it has been seen by over 2 million people.

The exhibition displays notable game developments from the early sixties to the present day, from the PDP-1 in 1960 to contemporary industry releases.

It reveals the design processes behind four of the most significant games of recent times: Tomb Raider, Grand Theft Auto, Pokémon and The Sims, following these games from their initial concept to the final product design.

Over 150 playable games are available, including Donkey Kong, Pong and Rock Band, and the top ten most influential games consoles.

Game On aims to highlight the wider, global framework of gaming, exploring the influence of manga and anime on computer games, as well as the films that have been influenced by, and continue to influence computer games. The exhibition also considers online gaming, music compositions for games, and the latest game technologies.

== Showings ==
- Barbican Art Gallery, London (May 2002 to September 2002)
- The Royal Museum at the National Museum of Scotland, Edinburgh (October 2002 to February 2003)
- Tilburg Art Foundation, Netherlands (May 2003 to August 2003)
- Helsinki City Art Museum, Finland (September 2003 to December 2003)
- A European Capital of Culture event in Lille, France (May 2004 to August 2004)
- Eretz Israel Museum in Israel (September 2004 to January 2005)
- The Tech Museum of Innovation, San Jose (September 2005 to January 2006)
- Museum of Science and Industry, Chicago (March 2005 to September 2005), (February 2006 to April 2006)
- Pacific Science Center, Seattle (May 2006 to August 2006)
- Science Museum, London (October 2006 to February 2007)
- Cyberport, Hong Kong (July 2007 to October 2007)
- Australian Centre for the Moving Image, Melbourne (March 2008 to July 2008)
- State Library of Queensland, Brisbane (November 2008 to February 2009)
- National Science and Technology Museum, Kaohsiung, Taiwan (18 July to 31 October 2009)
- The Cellars of Cureghem, Brussels (December 2009 to April 2010)
- Ambassador Theatre, Dublin ( 20 September 2010 to 30 January 2011)
- Galerías Monterrey, Monterrey, Mexico (30 April to 30 June 2011)
- Museu da Imagem e do Som (MIS), São Paulo, Brazil (10 November 2011 to 8 January 2012)
- CCBB, Brasília (26 January to 26 February 2012)
- Museum of Popular Art, Lisbon, Portugal (16 March to 30 June 2012)
- Costanera Center, Santiago Chile (27 March 2013 to 15 May 2013)
- Tecnopolis, Buenos Aires, Argentina (12 July 2013 to 3 November 2013)
- Montreal Science Centre, Montreal, Quebec, Canada (15 April 2015 to 13 September 2015)
- National Museum of Emerging Science and Innovation, Tokyo, Japan (2 March 2016 to 30 May 2016)

== Game On 2.0 ==
In 2010, the original show Game On was re-curated by Barbican International Enterprises to expand the original exhibition and the exhibition Game On 2.0 was produced. Game On 2.0 has been exhibited at:

- Queen Victoria Museum and Art Gallery, Launceston, Tasmania (3 July to 3 October 2010)
- Technopolis, Athens, Greece (16 December 2010 to 16 March 2011)
- Oregon Museum of Science and Industry, Portland, Oregon (2 July to 18 September 2011)
- Kinokino centre for Art and Film, Sandnes, Norway (25 February to 9 June 2012)
- VAM Design Center, Budapest, Hungary (19 October 2012 to 8 January 2013)
- Ontario Science Centre, Toronto, Ontario, Canada (9 March to 2 September 2013)
- Swedish National Museum of Science and Technology, Stockholm, Sweden (25 October 2013 to 28 September 2014)
- Life Science Centre, Newcastle upon Tyne, UK (23 May 2015 to 3 January 2016)
- Norsk Teknisk Museum, Oslo, Norway (March 2016 to 29 January 2017)
- Spazio Eventi Tirso, Rome, Italy (4 March 2017 to 6 June 2017)
- Pavilhão da Bienal – Parque Ibirapuera, São Paulo, Brazil (16 August 2017 to 12 November 2017)
- Village Mall, Rio de Janeiro, Brazil (1 December 2017 to 25 February 2018)
- OCT Harbour, Shenzhen, China (18 August 2018 to 14 October 2018)
- Fundacion Canal, Madrid, Spain (29 November 2019 to 31 May 2020)
- Forum Groningen, Groningen, The Netherlands (2 October 2021 to )
- National Museum of Scotland, Scotland (29 June to 3 November 2024)

== Games that have been exhibited ==
- 1942
- Adventure
- Alien Attack/Scramble
- Amanda the Witch's Apprentice (Dreamcast homebrew)
- Amidar
- Animal Crossing
- Asteroids
- Bag Man
- Berzerk
- Blue Dragon
- Bob the Builder
- Breakout
- Bubble Bobble
- BurgerTime
- Burnout Paradise
- Bust-A-Move 4
- Cars
- Castlevania: Lords of Shadow
- Caveman
- Centipede
- Child of Eden
- Chillingham
- Code Breaker (cheating device)
- Combat (Atari 2600 Pack-in Game)
- Cookie Monster Munch
- Cosmic Smash
- Dance Dance Fusion
- Dark Reign
- Daytona USA
- Densha De Go – Train simulator
- Destroy All Humans!
- Devil World
- Dig Dug
- Discs of Tron
- Dodonpachi Resurrection
- Donkey Kong
- Donkey Kong Country 3: Dixie Kong's Double Trouble!
- Donkey Kong Jr.
- Doom
- Dragon Ball Z: Budokai Tenkaichi 2
- Driver
- Elite
- Fighting Street
- Final Fantasy VII
- Forza Motorsport 2
- Freeway
- Frogger
- Galaga
- Galaxian
- Garou: Mark of the Wolves
- Gate of Thunder
- Go by Train 3
- GoldenEye 007
- Gradius V
- Guitar Hero
- Gunstar Super Heroes
- Half-Life 2
- Halo: Combat Evolved
- Halo 2
- Halo 3
- Heroes of the Pacific
- Hey You, Pikachu!
- Highway Star
- The Hitchhiker's Guide to the Galaxy
- Indy 500
- Jak and Daxter
- Junkbot
- Katamari Damacy
- Knack
- Lady Bug
- Le Mans 24 Hours
- The Legend of Zelda: Ocarina of Time
- Lego Star Wars: The Video Game
- Lemmings
- LocoRoco
- Magical Drop 3
- Manic Miner
- Mario & Sonic at the Olympic Games
- Mario Bros.
- Mario's Tennis
- Mario Superstar Baseball
- Max Payne
- Mega Man 4
- Metal Slug X
- Metroid Prime
- Missile Command
- Moon Cresta
- Moon Patrol
- MotorStorm
- Mr. Do!
- Ms. Pac-Man
- MSX Collection
- New Super Mario Bros.
- Nintendogs
- Odin Sphere
- OutRun 2006: Coast 2 Coast
- Overtop
- Pac-Man
- Parappa the Rapper 2
- Pengo
- Phoenix
- Pilotwings
- Pirates of the Burning Sea
- Pitfall!
- Pokémon Emerald
- Pokémon Stadium 2
- Pokémon XD: Gale of Darkness
- Pong
- Pony Friends
- Populous
- Portal 2
- Powerslide
- Prince of Persia
- Prince of Persia: The Sands of Time
- Pro Evolution Soccer 2008
- Puyo Puyo 2
- Puzzle Quest: Challenge of the Warlords
- Qix
- Rave Racer
- Rayman 2: The Great Escape
- Resogun
- Rez
- Ridge Racer
- RiME
- Rockstar Games Presents Table Tennis
- R-Type
- Rugby 08
- Sailor Moon Super S: Kondowa Puzzle de Oshiokiyo
- Samurai Shodown II
- Saturn Bomberman
- Scramble
- The Secret of Monkey Island
- Sega Superstars Tennis
- Shark Attack
- SimCity
- Simon 2
- Sokoban
- Sonic Mega Collection
- Sonic Rivals
- Sonic The Hedgehog
- Sonic X
- Space Invaders
- Space Invaders Part II
- Space Panic
- Space War
- Speak and Spell
- Star Soldier
- Star Wars
- Steel Battalion
- Street Fighter II Turbo
- Street Gangs
- Super Mario 64
- Super Mario All-Stars + Super Mario World
- Super Mario Kart
- Super Mario Galaxy 2
- Super Monkey Ball 2
- Super Smash Bros. Melee
- Mario Kart Wii
- Tennis
- Tetris
- The Hobbit
- The Sims
- Tomb Raider
- Tony Hawk's American Wasteland
- TowerFall (Ouya version)
- Track & Field
- Transformers
- TY the Tasmanian Tiger
- Uridium
- Vib-Ribbon
- Viewpoint
- Virtua Fighter
- Virtua Fighter 2
- Virtua Tennis 2
- V/SpaceLab Bricklane Walkthrough
- VS. Ice Climber
- Warlords
- Warning Forever
- The Way of the Exploding Fist
- Umihara Kawase
- Wii Sports
- Wii Sports Resort
- Windjammers
- Xevious
- Yaroze games

== See also ==
- The Art of Video Games – a similar exhibition at the Smithsonian American Art Museum that explores the artistic aspects of video games
- Game Masters (exhibition) – a similar exhibition at the Australian Centre for the Moving Image that explores key designers of the video game medium
- List of video games in the Museum of Modern Art – a list of video games in a similar, but smaller exhibition of the Museum of Modern Art
