= Radio Tarifa =

Radio Tarifa is a Spanish World music ensemble, combining Flamenco, Arab-Andalusian music, Arabic music, Moorish music and other musical influences of the Mediterranean, the Middle Ages and the Caribbean. The name of the ensemble comes from an imaginary radio station in Tarifa, a small town in the Spanish province of Cadiz, Andalusia, the closest part of Spain to Morocco. Instead of simply fusing musical styles as they are currently known, Radio Tarifa studied the common past of those styles, before the final conquest of Granada in 1492, when the Moors and Jews were exiled from Spain. This invented style sheds light upon the real styles of Spain, most notably flamenco, although the band rejected all musical purism, preferring to mix arrangements of traditional compositions with their own melodies and combining instruments from Ancient Egypt, classical Greek and Roman times with modern saxophones and electric bass.

== History ==
Faín and Vincent founded an early music group playing music from the late Middle Ages and Renaissance called 'Ars Antiqua Musicalis'. When they met Benjamin Escoriza from Granada in Madrid in the late 1980s, the last piece for a new band was in place.

Their first album, Rumba Argelina, was recorded in 1993 and became a success in Europe, and again, when it was re-issued (through association with Nonesuch Records) in America in 1997. Faín played strings and percussion as well as conducted and arranged discs and live groups. Benjamín sang and wrote lyrics. Vincent played wind instruments. The critical and financial success of that disc made it possible to put together a touring band which played in 17 European countries, as well as in Turkey, Morocco, Egypt, Palestine, Australia, New Zealand, Brazil, Colombia, Mexico, Canada and the United States".

After 14 years of intense musical activity, the band announced they would take an indefinite break; their farewell concert was performed in Barcelona on 11 November 2006. On 9 March 2012, singer Benjamin Escoriza died at the age of 58.

After a hiatus of nearly 20 years, Radio Tarifa released a new album "La Noche" on September 26th, 2025 featuring original band members Faín Dueñas, Vincent Molino, Benjamín Escoriza (from previously recorded material prior to his death), and several guest musicians and vocalists.

== Discography ==
- Rumba Argelina (1993)
- Temporal (1996)
- Cruzando el río (2000)
- Fiebre (2003) (live at the 2002 Toronto Small World Music Festival)
- Live 25 July 2004 - Ramallah, Palestine
- La Noche (2025)

== Personnel ==
- Benjamin Escoriza - vocals and lyrics
- Fain Sanchez Dueñas - darbuka, percussion, strings, arrangements and musical direction.
- Vincent Molino - ney, crumhorn, poitou oboe

=== Guests ===
- Jaime Muela - flute, soprano saxophone
- Pedro Esparza - soprano saxophone
- Amir-John Haddad - oud, backing vocals
- Wafir Sh. Gibril - accordion
- Ramiro Amusategui - bouzouki
- Jorge Gomez - flamenco guitar, electric guitar
- Sebastian Rubio - pandereta, bongos
- David Purdye - electric bass, backing vocals
- Peter Oteo - electric bass
- Javier Paxarino - flutes, wind instruments
