= Battleships Forever =

2007 video game

- Developer: Sean "th15" Chan
- Publisher: Independent
- Designer: Sean "th15" Chan
- Engine: Game Maker
- Platform: Windows
- Release: 2007
- Genre: Real-time tactics
- Mode: Single player

Battleships Forever is an IGF award-nominated freeware real-time tactics video game set in a futuristic space environment inspired by Warning Forever. While still in beta phase, there is no further development by the author. Players control a variety of spaceships and must position them to maximize damage on opposing ships and minimize damage to their own ships utilizing a wide variety of tactics and vessel sub-systems.

== Gameplay ==
Players can embark on a single-player campaign, play four different scenarios, or use a free-form "sandbox" gameplay mode. The game is played in 2D, with ships designed using raster graphics that resemble vector graphics. Battleships Forever has no resource management, and play centers on the positioning of ships to attain the best tactical solutions. The campaign begins with the player being issued a single ship, with more ships being added both during and between missions. Several grouped warships can be commanded at once, or individual turrets can be selected and issued attack commands. All, even the smallest ships, are separated into sections, each of which can be individually targeted and destroyed. The ships are separated into 3 categories: patrol craft (or frigates), destroyers, and battleships. Patrol craft tend to be small, with only 2 sections, and fast with 2-3 weapons and little to no defense. Destroyers are larger, 4-8 section craft with some active and passive defenses, but tend to focus on firepower.

A gameplay scene depicting ship formation

Battleships are highly specialized, with some acting as massive mobile shields for other vessels and others as heavy assault ships, able to focus comparatively huge amounts of firepower on a single target or multiple targets. One of the larger battleships, the Cronus, also carries a flux projector, which allows players to draw their own defense layout within set parameters using their mouse. Among other modules with special functions are several kinds of 'deflectors', which can render sections of ships invulnerable. Some defensive ships can also intercept and destroy enemy fire with their own weapons. Since ships are constructed from individual sections, if one section is destroyed the ship can continue to function. A ship editor is included with the game, which allows the player to design custom ships, which can be uploaded to the developer's website to share with other players. These ships can be used with the game's various 'skirmish' scenarios in place of the normally available selection of vessels (though any scores attained through the use of this feature are not valid and cannot be uploaded to the high score database), or spawned within the 'sandbox', which includes a number of special options not available in the other game modes, such as the ability to spawn asteroids, meteors, and powerups, or to destroy ships at ease.

== Development ==
Battleships Forever was created by Singaporean Sean "th15" Chan, using the free Game Maker software. The later releases have also been developed by community members of the Battleships Forever forums, mainly the largely expanded ShipMaker 4.0. Latest release happened in 2009 with version 0.9d, since then development is dormant and no support is provided anymore. Successor plans of the author did not materialize. Despite the years long dormancy, the author refrained from taking help offers and refused to open up the development and source code to the community.

== Ship Maker and Sandbox ==
The Ship Maker component began as a separate project by Jack Coady, but has since been developed by Sean Chan. The recent 4.0 release largely featured content developed by community members at the Wyrdysm Games forums. This includes many features that almost infinitely multiply the possibilities, including sprite importing for use in ship sections, turrets, doodads and bullets, as well as the ability for ships to spawn other custom built ships by the players. Moving and rotating sections were added, as well as the ability to make sections turn in key with a hidden weapon - allowing them to act as turrets.

Finally, a series of triggered events can be set up, such as a charging animation and firing sequence for a main weapon. Even working boolean logic gates can be set up using ShipMaker's trigger system, albeit via a convoluted process. Ships made in the Ship Maker can be played in various scenarios such as protecting a never ending evacuation from aliens, destroying a large alien battlestation, and acting as a pirate force looting civilians. The Sandbox lets the player spawn any custom ships into an area that can be resized by the player. These ships can be made to interact with one another at the player's leisure, or set to be controlled by one of two AI teams.

Since the release of the game, the Ship Maker has increasingly become the focus of the game for many players. In essence, the Ship Maker allows players to act as game designers on their own, molding a gameplay and visual experience to their own liking. While the gameplay largely remains an expansion on the original formula, with custom sprite import, graphics can greatly deviate from the standard vector-like graphic style created by Chan.

The most community-focused and multiplayer aspect of Battleships Forever is pitting custom ships made by one or more players against one another, controlled by the AI, in a form of gladiatorial combat to see which ship emerges victorious.

== Reception ==
Battleships Forever is a finalist in the 10th annual Independent Games Festival's Design Innovation Award and has received positive feedback from the indie gaming community. Independent gaming site Play This Thing's Greg Costikyan found the game "very nice indeed", but found that the game crashed sometimes and hoped this would be rectified when version 1.0 is released. He suggested that the game would appeal more to strategy gamers than action game fans. Shacknews' Chris Remo was impressed that the game had been designed single-handedly and described gameplay as "accessible, but not overly simplistic". GameAxis Online associate editor Ismet Bachtiar stated that Battleships Forever is the first Singaporean developed game to become a finalist in the Independent Games Festival's main category, "if there's one defining moment that marks the coming of age for Singapore game development, I'll have to point you to this amazing achievement by one lone individual".

== See also ==
- Warning Forever
- Captain Forever
