= Amir John Haddad =

German-Spanish flamenco musician

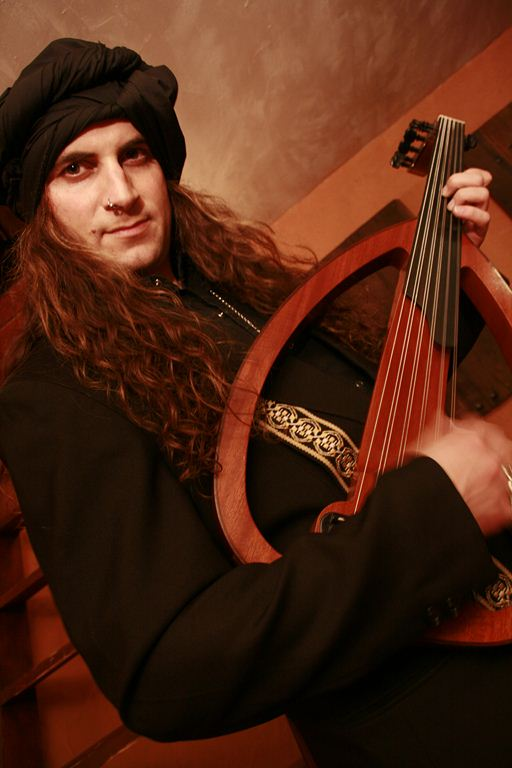

Background information
- Born: 28 August 1975
- Origin: Freiburg
- Instruments: flamenco guitar, Arabic oud, Greek bouzouki, Turkish Saz, banjo, triple neck electric guitar (6, 7 and 12 string), bass
- Label: Doublemoon Records

Amir John Haddad (born 1975) is a German-Spanish flamenco guitarist and multi-instrumentalist, based in Spain since 1997. He was the official oud, bouzouki and guitar player for Radio Tarifa for almost ten years and in that role received a nomination for Best Folk Album at the Latin Grammy Awards of 2004.

== Background ==
Haddad was born in Freiburg im Breisgau, West Germany (now Germany) in 1975, to a Colombian mother and a Palestinian father. He began learning the Arabic oud at home from his Palestinian father Rimon Haddad, and at the age of 8 he took up flamenco guitar and gave his first public performance at the age of 12. In 1997, at the age of 22, he moved to Jerez de la Frontera, one of the cultural homes of flamenco, to further his skills among the masters there, and moved to Madrid a year later. There he often performs in clubs such as Las Carboneras, Café de Chinitas, Corral de la Pacheca and Casa Patas. Haddad has performed worldwide and has played at such venues as the Royal Festival Hall, the Barbican Centre and the Royal Albert Hall in London, the HotHouse jazz club in Chicago, the Town Hall in New York, Luna Park in Los Angeles, the Teatro Bellini in Palermo, and the Palau de la música and Teatro Tivoli in Barcelona. He was the official oud, bouzouki and guitar player for Radio Tarifa for almost ten years and whilst there received a nomination for Best Folk Album at the Latin Grammy Awards of 2004.

Haddad has performed at numerous festivals including Festival de la Guitarra de Córdoba, MIDEA Festival Tenerife Canary Islands and the Murcia Tres Culturas Festival. In 1999 he won first prize for his original music composition at the Certamen Nacional de Coreografia para Danza Española y Flamenco (National Choreography Competition for Spanish Dance and Flamenco).

He's the guitarist for the World of Hans Zimmer band.

== Style and compositions ==
As a flamenco player Haddad is noted for his rich chord voicings, with a clear Moorish and Arabic influence. He frequently uses sophisticated jazz chords and innovative extended voicings for major and minor chords, and often creates a mysterious and atmospheric Moorish ambiance to his compositions through a lush tapestry of flat ninth, minor major seventh and augmented chords. Additionally he often uses slash chords, gripping the bass string. His picados are typically heavily executed and crisp-sounding, and his rasqueados are cascading and dynamic. He is also an adept player of rock music and metal electric guitar and embraces a wide range of styles.

In March 2013 Haddad, in collaboration with Thomas Vogt and Héctor Tellini, released the album 9 Guitarras, featuring flamenco music with an Arabic and Oriental flavour. The album takes its title from the nine different flamenco guitar, one for each track, loaned to him by guitar reseller Mundo Flamenco. His best-known compositions, Suena el viento (Rumba), Punta y tacón (Alegría), Recuerdos (Farruca) and Dos Palomas Vuelan (Balada), all feature on the album.
