= Notrium =

2003 video game

- Developer: Ville Mönkkönen
- Platforms: Windows, Linux
- Release: September 9, 2003
- Genre: Survival
- Mode: Single player

Notrium is a survival top-down view video game for PC/Microsoft Windows, developed by independent Finnish programmer Ville Mönkkönen. Released as freeware in 2003, later also the source code was released under a custom license. It won second place in the "Adventure Game of the Year" contest on GameTunnel. In 2015 a "Notrium Special Surprise Edition" was released commercially by the author in the digital distribution.

== Setting ==
=== Location ===
The game takes place on the fictional eponymous planet, Notrium. The game world is divided into large squares, each of which has its own separate environment and set of objectives. The player may move between squares at will to reach the other areas, though some are only accessible via methods such as boarding certain vehicles or using teleportation. Environments range from jungle terrain, to desert, to tundra, all of which are affected by a day-night cycle, except for interior levels which are artificially lit.

The game's graphics, aside from certain plot-related areas, are all randomly generated at the beginning of the game. Random generation affects the precise location of items and vegetation, though most objects and all scenery will remain in their environment square, the placement of which in relation to others is a set constant. For example, tree placement in the Jungle zone changes each time a new game is begun, but the start location will not, and the Jungle zone stays adjacent to the same areas.

=== Backstory ===
The general plot of the game is that a starship, the Var' Equinalin, is exploring the Hive sector, when it approaches the titular planet Notrium, and is attacked by ground-launched missiles. The player's character (either the human captain, the android engineer, the psionic medic, or the alien stowaway) manages to reach the only working escape pod (the others having been sabotaged by the alien) and crash-lands on the planet's surface. From there, they must find a way to survive, as well as a method of escape.

Varying on whichever character is being played, 'journal entries', which appear every day-night cycle for the first in-game fortnight, detail different happenings. For example, the journal of the Human tells that he was the captain of the ship, and details his experience on board the spacecraft; while the journal of the Android states that he was the ship's mechanic and goes into his point of view over the same proceedings. Other plot points outside of journal entries are triggered by entering certain locales, or completing an objective.

Notrium has several endings, which differ depending on what character the player has chosen to use. Some endings are exclusive to certain characters, while others can be achieved by more than one.

== Gameplay ==
Notrium is played from a top-down perspective, giving an overhead view of proceedings. The player may move in all directions while facing in a separate one, similar to the way a first-person shooter is controlled, and similar to the shareware PC shooter Crimsonland.

During the course of the game, the player encounters various items and objects strewn across the terrain, such as edible plants, weapons, and other machinery. As most needed materials, such as a protective force field, are not found intact, the player is required to build them out of two or three separate pieces. Most useful machinery in the game is constructed in this manner.

Gameplay revolves around harvesting needed materials to build, defend oneself against enemies, and ultimately achieving one of the game's endings. Depending on the character chosen, the game is played differently. Most characters begin with a weak attack, and no weaponry, yielding them quite vulnerable to the various enemies. The Alien begins with a powerful attack and evolves more abilities over time, though it cannot use weapons, so an Alien player tends to be more aggressive, taking advantage of the more difficult endings which would take longer for other characters to achieve. In contrast, the Human is weaker, and a Human player will take time to build up a heavy arsenal of weaponry and armor before attempting action.

In-game weather also plays a large part in the game. On difficulty settings above 'easy', the player's character is affected by the elements, especially heat and cold. Standing near a fire or in the shade of a tree will counteract these two, and later in the game the player is able to construct an armor which decreases the effects of weather. In some areas of the game, weather is more extreme; the location undergoing sand storms, blizzards, or acid rain.

=== Mods ===
Notrium is designed to be highly moddable, and a guide to modifying is provided for download on Ville's website. When the player begins a new game, they are able to choose the mod they want to play, provided that additional mods have been downloaded and placed in the correct place in the main Notrium folder on the player's PC desktop.

Mods can have a variety of different effects, such as adding new items and objectives, altering or creating new environments, or even adding a completely new character for play in the case of the popular "Werivar" mod.

== History ==
Notrium was developed by independent Finnish programmer Ville Mönkkönen and released in 2003. It is the seventh game by Mönkkönen, but only the fifth to be released fully in English. Notrium's source code was released by the developer after 2003 under a custom open-source like software license. It is developed as OpenNotrium on GitHub by the community, with new code being GPLv3. Following that, the game was ported to many other platforms (Linux etc.), also mobile devices like the Pandora.

On Dec 8, 2015 a "Notrium Special Surprise Edition" was released commercially by the author in the digital distribution adding some improvements.

== Reception ==
The game won second place in the "Adventure Game of the Year" contest on GameTunnel. In a 2014 retrospective, Rock, Paper, Shotgun noted Notrium as one of the early procedural generated survival games.
