= Synth (video game) =

2009 video game

SYNTH
- Developer(s): Rhys Paul Hovey
- Platform(s): Microsoft Windows
- Release: 2009
- Genre(s): Action, real-time strategy
- Mode(s): Single-player

Synth is an action real-time strategy video game by Canadian developer Rhys Paul Hovey for Microsoft Windows. Synth is an abstract and procedurally generated 3D game, in which the graphics have an algorithmic C++ representation.

== Gameplay ==
Synth is a strategic action game, in which the player must find an exit in a procedurally generated landscape. The player is equipped with a laser, bombs, and a device that acts as a vacuum or blower. The overall goal is to reach the highest level possible.

Synth uses C++ algorithms to generate the level's structure and graphics. Levels are seeded from four-letter words: for example, "BGNI" is the first level. As the game does not need to store pre-rendered textures and model data, only small filesizes are required.

Synth's drum and bass synthesizer soundtrack dynamically changes during the game. The sounds were pre-composed by Hovey, but the player's controls are mapped to a loop-sequence remixer.

== Development ==
Hovey cites the artwork of Roger Dean (who produced the covers for several Psygnosis titles), other Amiga graphics, and Pink Floyd as influences for Synth's imagery.

Synth is currently only available as a game demo. Once a full version is ready, Hovey intends to acquire a digital distribution deal.

== Critical reception ==
Todd Ciolek, an editor with Gamasutra made reference to the game's experimental design: "Rhys Paul Hovey’s SYNTH is an experimental game in many ways". Rock, Paper, Shotgun drew comparisons with the visuals of Darwinia and the procedural nature of .kkrieger. The graphics were described as fascinating: "a bizarre, mesmerizing cross between the deeply archaic and the thoroughly high-tech."

In November 2010, SYNTH:Electropix 64 bit version 1.505, won 1st place in the Intel corporation's "Level up" 2010 game demo contest, in the "Best game for a desktop" category. Hovey used the user name Paul Richard.

== See also ==
- Procedural generation
- Psychedelic art
