= Vile: Exhumed =

2025 video game

- Developer: Cara Cadaver
- Publisher: DreadXP
- Engine: Unity
- Platform: Windows
- Release: 6 August 2025
- Genres: Point-and-click, horror
- Mode: Single-player

Vile: Exhumed (stylized as VILE: Exhumed) is a 2025 point-and-click horror video game developed by Cara Cadaver and published by DreadXP. Though initially slated for a Steam release on 22 July 2025, the game was banned from the service, attracting accusations of censorship, and released by the developer as freeware on 6 August 2025. It depicts the player searching through an individual's computer and learning of his insane and parasocial obsession with a porn star.

== Gameplay ==
Vile: Exhumed is a point-and-click game that simulates the user interface of a late 1990s personal computer operating system, a style that has been compared to that of Hypnospace Outlaw, Simulacra, and Her Story. The player explores the computer of Shawn Gerighs, a horror and pornography fan, by browsing websites he visited and viewing his files, emails, and chat logs.

== Development and release ==
The earliest version of the game released to the public, a prototype simply titled Vile, was released on itch.io in 2024. Canada-based developer Cara Cadaver, who had previously released two other games on itch.io under the name Final Girl Games, began working on the game as a personal project not intended for public release. Cadaver drew on personal experiences in developing Vile and described the development process as mentally exhausting but cathartic, calling the game "a page ripped right from my journal". After Vile was released to positive reception, becoming the subject of let's plays on YouTube and Twitch, Cadaver partnered with video game publisher DreadXP in early 2025 to develop a "director's cut" version of the game to be released on the video game distribution platform Steam. A demo of this version, titled Vile: Exhumed, was previewed at PAX East in May 2025 to positive reception. In early July 2025 it was announced that the full game would release later that month on 22 July 2025.

On 21 July 2025, a day before the announced release date, the developer announced that the game's release had been delayed, stating that they had been waiting for the final build to be approved by Steam for approximately a month but had not received any updates. The game's Steam sales page was taken down on 25 July. A few days later, on 28 July, the developer announced that Vile: Exhumed had been removed from Steam and banned from the platform. The ban, which cannot be appealed, was purportedly due to alleged "sexual content with depictions of real people". The developer and publisher disputed this and accused Steam of censorship, stating that Vile: Exhumed contains "no uncensored nudity, no depictions of sex acts, and no pornography present at all". Critics noted that all sexual content in the game is implied through text rather than directly shown, and Vile, the prototype version released the previous year, remained available on itch.io despite containing much of the same content.

On 6 August 2025, in response to the ban, the developer and publisher launched vileisbanned.com and released Vile: Exhumed for free as shareware under a Creative Commons license. The website hosts a statement from the developer regarding the ban, methods to download the game, and an option to donate to support the game, with 50% of the game's profits donated to a Toronto-based domestic violence charity.
