= Temporal (Radio Tarifa album) =

Studio album by Radio Tarifa
- Released: 1997
- Label: World Circuit; Nonesuch
- Producer: Fain Dueñas, Vincent Molino

Radio Tarifa chronology
Rumba Argelina (1993)	Temporal (1997)	Cruzando el Río (2001)

Temporal is the second album by the Spanish band Radio Tarifa, released internationally in 1997. The band supported the album with a North American tour.

== Production ==
The album was produced by Fain Dueñas and Vincent Molino; Dueñas was also the musical director. Temporal incorporates more flamenco elements into the band's sound. Radio Tarifa used such instruments as the darbuka, oud, crumhorn, and ney. Studio musicians backed Radio Tarifa's three main members. "El Mandil de Carolina" is a traditional Castilian and Galician composition.

== Critical reception ==
Professional ratings
Review scores
Source	Rating
AllMusic	4/5 stars
The Encyclopedia of Popular Music	4/5 stars
MusicHound World: The Essential Album Guide	4.5/5 stars

The Washington Post wrote that, "as is demonstrated by such pieces as the flamenco 'Solea' or 'Conductus', a 12th-century processional, Radio Tarifa also moves assuredly from the cafe to the cathedral." The Guardian determined that "it's postmodern early music, for want of a funkier phrase, poised, surprising, inspiring, throbbing with percussion and sweeping the listener with Arabic instrumentation and Andalucian voices."

Guitar Player concluded that "scholars and romantics alike will be seduced by their soulful vocals, explosive percussion, and superb fretwork." The Globe and Mail deemed Temporal "a wonderful combination of Mediterranean styles." The St. Paul Pioneer Press called it "a dizzy, danceable stew of Afro-Latin rhythms."

AllMusic noted that "the ensemble concentrates on traditional material from Iberia, with pieces culled from Galician, Andalucian, Castilian, and Flamenco culture."

== Track listing ==
No.	Title	Length
1.	"La Tarara"
2.	"Las Cuevas"
3.	"Canción Sefardí"
4.	"Baile de Almut"
5.	"Soleá"
6.	"Tangos de la Condición"
7.	"Conductus"
8.	"Temporal"
9.	"El Mandil de Carolina"
10.	"Vestido de Flores"
