= Daniel Remar =

Swedish game developer

- Occupation: Game developer
- Website: http://www.remar.se/daniel/

Daniel Remar is a Swedish game developer. His most notable games include Iji, Hero Core, Hyper Princess Pitch and MURI. He also has various other games, the majority made in Game Maker. Most of his games are freeware and are available on the internet, the exception being MURI. Remar worked at Swedish indie studio Ludosity from 2010 to 2023, but has since left, though he has retained partial ownership of the studio.

== Iji ==
Remar started working on Iji in 2004 when he first discovered Game Maker, built a sprite for Iji, the main character and decided to build a video game around her. On September 1, 2008, Iji was released. While he clearly states on his website that no sequels or prequels will be released, he still does bugfixes, and releases the updated versions periodically.

== MURI ==
MURI is a 2D DOS-like platform shooter released in December 2013 for Ludosity. Muri was inspired by DOS games Duke Nukem and Commander Keen. It has a 320*200 EGA graphics mode that uses the 16 CGA colors for its palette and incorporates an audio function that only allows one sound to play at a time. While the game runs at 16 frames per second a 32 frames per second alternative option is available.
