= One Night Trilogy =

Video game series

- Developer: Dark Gaia Studios
- Series: One Night Trilogy
- Engine: RPG MAKER VX
- Platform: PC
- Release: January 2009: Initial release
- Genre: Survival horror

The One Night Trilogy is the collective title for a series of freeware indie psychological horror games developed by Dark Gaia Studios using the RPG Maker VX engine. The games were released over a three-year period across the indie gaming community and elsewhere, have been showcased in PC Gamer magazine twice since their release and consistently feature in countdowns of the best games created with the RPG Maker engine. The three games do not follow in chronological order.

In 2013, a fourth game in the series was announced following a crowd funding campaign but its development has since been rebooted as the first game in an unrelated franchise.

== Overview ==
The One Night Trilogy, comprising three games, One Night, One Night 2: The Beyond and One Night: Full Circle, is a series of 2D tile-based overhead psychological horror games. The three games tell the story of an attempt to invade Earth by a race of supernatural shadow people and a collection of protagonists who must survive the attacks and fight against them. The origins of the creatures and their motives are detailed in the prequel, One Night 2: The Beyond, while the first and third games deal with subsequent invasion attempts and the conclusion to the conflict.

The games feature gameplay that is fairly typical of the survival horror genre. The player advances by moving through the games' locations collecting items and solving puzzles. While exploring, the player will often encounter traps or enemies, which they can either engage in combat with or avoid entirely. As supplies such as health packs and ammunition are generally scarce, the player is encouraged to use caution and avoid getting trapped by enemies. Each of the three games also features multiple endings; different outcomes will be unlocked depending on the player's actions during gameplay, though not all of the possible endings are considered canon.

== One Night ==
One Night is the first game in the series, released in January 2009. It takes place in July 2012 and follows an amnesiac CIA agent named Colt, who awakens in a crumbling research facility infested by otherworldly monsters. He eventually teams up with another surviving agent and together they discover that the facility administrator sabotaged an experiment in the facility, causing it to be swallowed up in an inter-dimensional portal and "merge" with another universe, which has resulted in most of the facility's staff turning into monsters.

Ultimately, Colt reverses the "merge" and returns the facility to normality, allowing him to escape, though it is unclear who manipulated the facility administrator to cause the "merge" and why. This loose end is explored in the third game, which is a direct sequel. Depending on how they played, the player can receive one of three endings, where Colt survives alongside one, both, or none of the facility's other survivors.

== One Night 2: The Beyond ==
One Night 2: The Beyond, released six months following the first game, takes place two decades earlier, in July 1987. Players take control of one of two selectable protagonists (a detective, John Faraday or a writer, Sara Wickson) as they become trapped in a supposedly haunted mansion named "The Beyond" and must try to survive the night. Eventually, the chosen protagonist discovers that the mansion was built on top of a series of old coal mines wherein a construction of extraterrestrial origin has been buried since the late Bronze Age.

The beings within the construction, known as "shadow people", who possess psychokinetic powers, have been driven from their own world due to war and have fled to Earth, which they plan to conquer. However, their journey to Earth has weakened them and they have remained in suspended animation underneath the mansion for thousands of years, awakening in the mid-20th century to regain their powers by slowly bringing the mansion and the surrounding countryside under their control.

By the point of the game's beginning, they have almost regained full power, and, after uncovering their back story and unlocking the way to the mines, the game's protagonist defeats them, reducing their power to almost nothing once again and releasing the house from their control. The game features four different endings that the player can achieve based on their performance, with two available for each of the selectable characters.

One Night 2 is notably different from the previous game in tone and gameplay, with a noticeable emphasis on exploration rather than combat and a much darker atmosphere.

== One Night: Full Circle ==
One Night: Full Circle is the third and final game in the One Night Trilogy, released more than two years after the original game in April 2011. It takes place seven years after the original game, in 2019. The protagonist of One Night: Full Circle is Tom Hawkin, who travels to the town of Stillwater to search for a missing relative, only to find it abandoned and infested with monsters and shadow people. In Stillwater, he meets Colt, the protagonist of One Night who has also been drawn to the town, and the two team up to discover what has happened to the town and how it is connected to the events of the previous games.

In the course of exploring the town, Tom and Colt learn that following their defeat at the end of the second game, the shadow people left "The Beyond" behind to find other ways to regain their lost power. Seeking to create an influx of negative energy to reinvigorate them, they placed John Faraday (one of the protagonists of One Night 2) under their control and used him to blackmail a government researcher, leading to the events of One Night. As they were foiled by Colt, they were once again left powerless, and the catastrophe that has befallen Stillwater is yet another attempt to rupture the fabric of reality and gather more power. Full Circle covers the shadow people's final attempt to control humanity and, depending on decisions made by the player during the game, they either succeed or fail in one of two different endings.

== Critical reception ==
Since their release in the RPG Maker community, the three games have generated considerable popularity. The third game was featured in the October 2011 issue of PC Gamer in the United States, where it was listed as an "adorable top down horror game". An earlier version of the game also appeared in the magazine in February 2011, where it was commended for "turning survival horror into something that can be idly enjoyed in the afternoon", though with criticism given to its writing a narrative.

Within the RPG Maker community, the series has been stated as "ranking up there with some of the better games from the RPG Maker scene" by Sore Losers Gaming, an RPG Maker developer's blog. The first game was also featured on the official RPG Maker website for Halloween in 2011, with particular mention given to its soundtrack and puzzles, and all three games have been reviewed positively within the RPG Maker community.

In October 2012, all three games in the trilogy were featured as a Freeware Game Pick on IndieGames.com, a sister site of Gamasutra. The IndieGames.com writer noted that the second game was his favourite, praising its "Lovecraftian" atmosphere. On Halloween 2012, the trilogy was also listed among the Top Five Indie Horror Games by review site New Gamer Nation, who gave special mention to the sound design and visual style of the games. A year later, the third game was featured in an article listing the Top Ten Free RPG Maker Horror Games by review website FreePCGamers.com.
