= Iji =

2008 video game

- Iji logo.
- Designer: Daniel Remar
- Platforms: Microsoft Windows, macOS
- Release: September 1, 2008
- Genres: Platform, shooter, Metroidvania
- Mode: Single-player

Iji is a freeware 2008 video game featuring platform and shooting elements, developed by Daniel Remar using Game Maker over a period of four years. In the game, the player controls Iji Kataiser, a young woman enhanced with nanotechnology, as she navigates a research facility on modern-day Earth in the wake of an invasion by the Tasen, an alien species. Awakening after an aerial bombardment, Iji finds herself enhanced with nanotechnology and, learning of the Tasen and their invasion, resolves to convince the aliens' leader to retreat from the planet, guided by her brother Dan via the complex's loudspeaker system. Iji was generally well received. Reviews praised the replay value, the player's ability to guide Iji on different moral paths, and that it was created by a single developer.

Iji was first released on September 1, 2008. The original version used version 5.3a of Game Maker; a major update, version 1.7, was released in 2017 that used the Game Maker 7.0 framework for better compatibility with recent OSes (e.g. Windows 10, macOS). It also added a sizable amount of new features, including new endings, more plot, a revamped upgrade interface, a new nonlethal skill tree, overhauled graphics, faster walking speed, changes to the hacking minigame, and more interaction tracking for Iji's actions over the course of the game.

Previously only available in English, a Polish version of the game was released on January 31, 2025.

== Gameplay ==
Iji (centre) crouches above a Komato Annihilator and a Tasen Elite (bottom left)

Iji is described by Remar as System Shock 2 in 2D. Players control the titular character, Iji, a human woman who has been enhanced with nanotechnology following the invasion of Earth by an alien species known as the Tasen. Iji must navigate a research station while being guided by her brother Dan, who communicates via the station's loudspeaker system, in order to convince the aliens' leader to retreat from the planet. Though the game's plot is linear, interactions with non-player characters (NPCs) change according to the player's actions, leading to one of multiple endings. The player's primary choice is between pursuing Iji's goal either as a pacifist, or by engaging in violence against the alien threat.

Iji's nanotech energy field functions as a shield, and players begin the game armed with a shotgun. Seven further weapons can be collected throughout the game, including a machine gun, rocket launcher, and alien technology such as the Shocksplinter weapon. Eight additional weapons can be unlocked by combining the standard firearms using a combining station, depending on her Crack ability. Blue nanofields that function as experience can be collected during play. When enough are collected Iji gains a level. Each level she gains allows the player to use an upgrade station to increase one of Iji's seven skills by one level. These skills include physical traits such as strength and health, as well as abilities such as close-quarters combat and computer cracking. Iji's jumping ability and armor can both be improved twice each during play if players can find their power-ups.

== Plot ==
The player controls Iji, who in opening cutscenes accompanies her little sister Mia as they are shown around a science facility by her father. She notices activity in the clouds, and suddenly the sky is lit by beams of light. When the game resumes, months later, Iji awakens to find that she has been modified by a team of researchers using alien nanotechnology, making her a cyborg soldier. Via a loudspeaker, her brother Dan explains that the area was struck by a space-to-ground weapon called an "Alpha Strike" wielded by aliens called "Tasen". This, and an ensuing ground invasion, killed nearly every human in the facility, including their father and sister. Dan advises Iji to try to convince the Tasen "Elite" leader, known as Krotera, to leave.

On her way to Krotera, Iji discovers the invasion is worldwide. Further on, she discovers a scout team of a different alien species, the "Komato", who Dan explains is an "interplanetary peacekeeping force". Iji encounters Krotera, who tells her that this was the last Tasen colony, and that they had come to Earth to escape the Komato. He is then killed either in direct combat with Iji or by an underling sympathetic to humanity's plight. Dan advises Iji to continue on to a Tasen communication area nearby, in order to send a distress call to the Komato.

The Komato Imperial Army, led by General Tor and Iosa "The Invincible", arrives and engages both the Tasen and Iji with genocidal intent, inflicting heavy losses. Iji navigates through the chaos to the roof of the complex and is confronted by the Komato Assassin Asha; after she defeats him, he teleports away. Iji meets with Dan, who reveals that the Komato are planning to destroy the planet's surface in an attempt to annihilate the remaining Tasen. Dan urges Iji to destroy the Phantom Hammer—a device that will destroy the shields currently protecting Earth—in order to secure time before the Alpha Strike. Iji boards a Komato ship, destroying the Phantom Hammer and a Komato sentry sent to stop her. However, another ship deploys its own Phantom Hammer, destroying the shields. Asha kidnaps Dan and again confronts Iji, potentially resulting in Dan's death and Iji suffering a psychotic breakdown. Iji encounters the remaining Tasen forces hiding in a fortified base. Here, depending on how the player has played Iji, one of three options can occur: (1) Iosa breaks in and annihilates all the Tasen, (2) some Tasen manage to escape before the break-in, or (3) the shelter opens and allows for Iji to pass through (and therefore intercept Iosa before she can kill the Tasen). Outside the base, Iji confronts and defeats Iosa; she is then offered the chance to either finish Iosa off or to spare her. If Iji has previously met with the rogue assassin named Ansaksie, she will receive her assistance against Iosa, culminating in Ansaksie finishing Iosa off herself.

In the last sector, Asha is either slain in a final battle with Iji or commits suicide if she finds a way to circumvent him. On the roof, Iji finds General Tor, and argues to spare the Earth from the Alpha Strike because Iosa has already killed the last of the Tasen (or claims so if the Tasen have survived). Tor claims he has no real power, but must appease the people, even though he himself is weary of the war. Resolved to stop one another, they fight, and Iji beats Tor, gravely injuring him.

In the default ending, Iji spares Tor. Recognizing her will to survive, Tor orders the Komato fleet to cancel the Alpha Strike and evacuate Earth, telling Iji that he is giving her planet a chance to survive; afterwards he commits suicide. Iji walks outside to the side of a cliff, either by herself or alongside Dan, and sees the Komato ships depart. The credit sequence shows life on Earth slowly returning, in spite of the devastation. If Iji previously spared Iosa, then the latter returns to save Tor; she chastises Iji for sparing her life and kills her before she can react. In turn, both Tor and his second-in-command Kiron berate her for her reckless behaviour and the Alpha Strike is called off; Tor then lets himself be killed by a demoted and humiliated Iosa, who then leaves with the fleet. If Iji has acted without mercy throughout the game, she may execute Tor. Kiron berates her for killing the only man willing to negotiate with humanity before executing the Alpha Strike and annihilating humanity. The credit sequence shows Earth devastated and the Komato forces returning in triumph.

== Development ==
Concept artwork for the character of Iosa, from which Remar created a 3D model

Development of Iji began in 2004, after Remar learned about and began to use Game Maker. Inspired by the animations of Alien 3 and Another World, he created a 3D model of the character Iji and started to build a basic platform game around it. Remar has stated that the name "Iji" has no special meaning, but that the character and name is a combination of his previous characters, and that he wanted the main characters' names to be "short and easily recognizable".

The soundtrack for Iji is credited in the game manual to Chris Geehan and Dan Byrne McCullough, with additional music from Tom Mauritzon, Captain Goodnight and LifeForce.

The credits song, "Further", is a song from the VNV Nation album Burning Empires, covered by the band LifeForce, which consisted of Mithra Sadeghati and Kahl Hellmer. Not much is known about the band, except that Kahl Hellmer later co-founded the band Machinae Supremacy.

Around 2013 the source code for the game was made available by Daniel Remar. Asha later appeared as a playable character in the fighting game Slap City, with Ansaksie as an alternate skin for the character.

== Reception ==
Iji has received a mostly positive response from commentators, particularly for its replay value. PopMatters' L.B. Jeffries stated that the player's choice in guiding Iji to the end of the game as either a pacifist or an aggressor, along with the outcomes of those paths, sets Iji apart from other games.

Anthony Burch of gaming website Destructoid was not as positive, highlighting the game's limitations in terms of abilities. Investing points in hand-to-hand combat, for instance, does not increase damage inflicted by a successful attack but instead dictates which enemy types can be physically attacked. He stated this system "makes leveling the player's individual stats feel less like you're actually improving your character and more like you're simply collecting keys to unlock doors."

The game was voted number one in the Free Indie of the Year 2008 contest by Bytejacker.

== See also ==
- Hero Core, another game by Daniel Remar.
