= Masocore =

Video game genre

Masocore is a video game subgenre with a focus on intense difficulty, often featuring complex or unfair mechanics. The name is a portmanteau of "masochism" and "hardcore", suggesting that players of the genre are hardcore gamers who find pleasure in the aggravation required to beat the games and the feeling of reward afterwards for having surpassed a seemingly insurmountable challenge. Masocore games are mostly 2D sidescrollers, harkening back to retro Nintendo hard platformers, although the definition can also be taken to encompass fully 3D games of high difficulty such as soulslikes.

== Concepts ==
Masocore games are mostly platformers, and are specifically designed to frustrate players. Unlike classic games, masocore titles often offer infinite lives, encouraging the player to try over and over again with little friction.

Games of the subgenre are popular with speedrunners, who spend thousands of hours mastering the games completely and then compete to be at the top of the leaderboards.

== History ==
Some of the first masocore games were created out of nostalgia for classic titles, such as Castlevania, Mega Man, and Ghosts n' Goblins. Fans wanted to recreate the feeling of euphoria after beating a difficult game, and therefore created similar indie games themselves. Before the genre itself was established, numerous Kaizo Mario hacks were created that greatly increased the game's difficulty.

The term was popularized by the gaming blog Auntie Pixelante, there attributed to an unknown SelectButton forum member.

Examples of masocore games include Spelunky (2008) and Super Meat Boy (2010). Other notoriously hard titles include I Wanna Be the Guy (2007), Dustforce (2012), Geometry Dash (2013), 1001 Spikes (2014), and Celeste (2018). The game director of Nioh (2017) stated that he intended the game to be masocore, and the development team therefore "consciously avoided making the game easy".

Due to its pick-up-and-play portability and library of challenging indie games, the Nintendo Switch has been called "a perfect platform for masocore games".
