= Genetos =

2007 video game

GENETOS
- Developer(s): Tatsuya Koyama
- Publisher(s): Tatsuya Koyama
- Platform(s): Windows
- Release: JP: December 20, 2007; NA: December 20, 2007; PAL: December 20, 2007
- Genre(s): Shoot 'em up
- Mode(s): Single Player

"GENETOS" is a freeware vertical shooter game or "shoot 'em up" developed and published by Tatsuya Koyama with an "evolution" theme. In GENETOS, the levels represent different generations in the evolution of shooting games.

The video game was developed entirely by Tatsuya Koyama who provided the graphics, programming and music, creating GENETOS entirely himself. GENETOS is free to download from Tatsuya Koyama's personal website, downloadable in either Japanese or English from the corresponding page.

== Gameplay ==
The gameplay of GENETOS is focused around the evolution of "shmups" or shoot 'em ups throughout history. The game starts off with simple graphics reminiscent of Space Invaders being a "Gallery Shooter" or "Fixed Shooter" having limited graphics, music, movement and sound effects.

An example of gameplay in stage 1 of GENETOS, which shows similarity to Space Invaders

Each level or generation gradually goes further in the history of shoot 'em up games moving into a late eighties world with free-movement restricted to half the screen, a "more standard" level improving the layout and graphics of the game and giving the player more firepower and giving the player bombs which can be used with the X button on the keyboard. The fourth level in the game features simple 3D graphics and shifts to a "Bullet Hell" game featuring much higher numbers of bullets and number of enemies.

The fifth level of GENETOS or the "Final Generation" changes largely in tone following a story more so than the levels before. the player travels through various stages of evolution such as birth, variation and extinction loosely following the theory of natural selection and Darwin's theory of evolution.

Each level ends with a boss or a "mutant", triggered by gathering enough items allowing the item bar to be 4/5 full or collecting 800 of a 1000 total items. Filling the item bar will allow the player to "evolve" into the next generation of shooting games, improving graphics, firepower and special attacks of the players ship.

Scoring in GENETOS is mainly done by picking up point items which are blue rather than regular items being green, in the third level the player can stop shooting to allow powerups and items around to drift towards the ship and further in the game this becomes faster allowing the player to collect items easier.

Collecting green DNA powerups in GENETOS allows the player to gain the special attacks and bonuses, these are found in various places in the games by defeating enemies. The way the player plays through GENETOS affects the special weapons they get, playing in certain ways, dying or staying alive, staying in certain areas of the screen or defeating a boss with a weak ship can unlock these bonus weapons, helping the player throughout the game.

The difficulty of GENETOS varies depending on the era of game it is portraying itself upon, getting more difficult with each generation ending as a "bullet hell" type of game.

== Soundtrack ==
The soundtrack of GENETOS consists of 14 tracks used as background music in-game. All music was composed and arranged by Tatsuya Koyama. An additional three tracks were included with the full release of GENETOS, being "Origin", "Answer" and "Rebirth", as MIDI files. The game's soundtrack can be accessed by entering the "Sound test" section in the game menu; Koyama later released the soundtrack onto Booth.fm in 2019, with the release featuring a remix of the game's title track, "The Planet GENETOS."

An example of gameplay in stage 5 of GENETOS

All tracks are written by Tatsuya Koyama.

No.	Title	Length
1.	"The Planet GENETOS"
2.	"Preparation"
3.	"Little Invader"
4.	"Big Invader"
5.	"Lonely Galaxy"
6.	"Lonely Universe"
7.	"Blue Sky"
8.	"Dark Cloud"
9.	"Dawn of a New Era"
10.	"Price of Prosperity"
11.	"Origin"
12.	"Answer"
13.	"Rebirth"
14.	"Game Over"

== Release history ==
The first version of GENETOS, 0.50 was released on 20 December 2007. Version 0.60 was released on 10 August 2008 having most of the basic features. It featured the first four levels in the game, ending after the fourth level unfinished and lacking credits. Version 1.0 of GENETOS being the completed version was released on 24 December 2009 being the first full release of GENETOS and the current version; many features were added such as "history" system which allows the player to complete achievements or collect hidden green DNA powerups in game to obtain special weapons. The fifth level was also added, adding the conclusion to the game finishing with new credits. Various other aspects were released with the first full version of the game such as a new title screen, other menus, more music and graphics in the game. The game is currently in its completed state according to Tatsuya Koyama.

== Reception ==
GENETOS has been generally received well, often getting praise for its unique concept and portrayal of the history of shoot 'em up games. The game has received slight criticism or has been noted for its difficulty citing the number of lives and bombs saying "the game on its default level of difficulty is generous with extra ships." but also that "the stages are appropriately difficult to reflect the trend of complexity in shooters, the game on its default level of difficulty is generous with extra ships.".
