= Temporal region =

Temporal region may refer to:

- Temporal lobe, one of the four major lobes of the cerebral cortex in the brain of mammals
- Temple (anatomy), the side of the head behind the eyes
