= Syobon Action =

2007 video game

- Title screen
- Developer: Chiku
- Series: Mario (unofficial)
- Platforms: Microsoft Windows, Android, iOS
- Release: February 2007
- Genre: Platform
- Mode: Single-player

Syobon Action, (Note: Japanese: しょぼんのアクション, Hepburn: Shobon no Akushon) also known as Cat Mario, is a Japanese freeware platform game released in February 2007. The game features frustrating elements that has made it subject to internet video game commentary, such as ostensibly innocuous objects that kill the character in ways unforeseeable to the player. Though the game is a parody of Super Mario Bros. for the Nintendo Entertainment System, it adds elements from other Mario games such as Super Mario World. This game also features various references to 2channel Shift_JIS art, with the main character and enemies literally being from it.

== Development ==
Syobon Action was released as freeware for Windows in February 2007. The game was designed by independent Japanese game developer "Chiku", and was inspired by The Big Adventure of Owata's Life, a similar game released through the Japanese 2channel message board a year prior. Chiku chose to make his game a spoof of Super Mario Bros. due to its massive recognition and popularity. The first stage was completed in three days and presented at a cultural festival hosted at his college campus, becoming the most popular work presented. A video showcasing the demo was uploaded to his Niconico account a few days later and garnered over 1,000 views shortly after, which prompted Chiku to make the demo a full game. Three new stages were produced within the span of two weeks.

== Reception ==
Syobon Action was generally received positively, though the reviews note the intense and often frustrating difficulty of the game. It was recognized as a game that "systematically disrupts every convention of 2D platform gameplay", and that success in the game often relies on both trial-and-error-like strategies and the player's ability to use counterintuitive strategies to avoid obstacles. Open Syobon Action, an unofficial open source clone of the game, was downloaded via SourceForge.net over 150,000 times between 2010 and 2020.

== See also ==
- List of unofficial Mario media
- Trap Adventure 2
- I Wanna Be the Guy
- 2channel
