= Temporal (video game) =

2008 video game

- Developer(s): Oren Bartal
- Publisher(s): Oren Bartal
- Designer(s): Oren Bartal
- Composer(s): Daniel Slabodar
- Platform(s): Windows
- Release: October 2, 2008
- Genre(s): platform, puzzle

Temporal is a freeware videogame featuring platform and puzzle elements. The game was created by Israeli developer Oren Bartal using the Allegro library.

== Gameplay ==
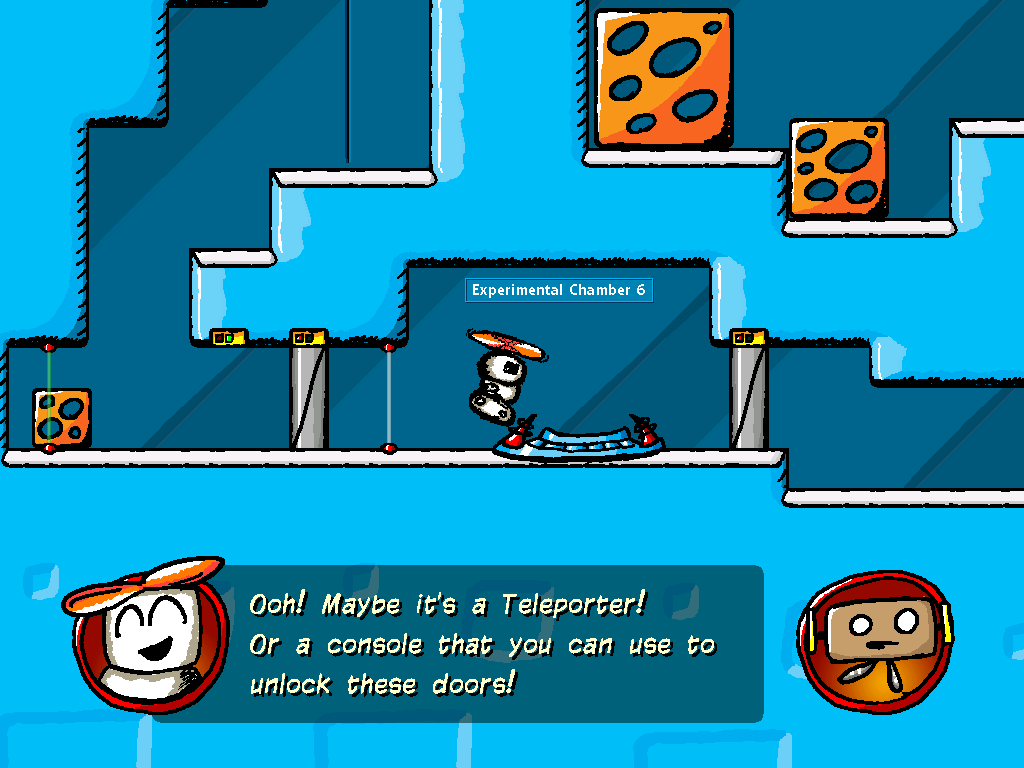
Temporal screenshot

In Temporal, players control an unnamed robotical being which cannot recall his past and tries to figure out where he is, and his purpose. With only a propeller on his head, players control the quirky robot using only the arrow keys - interacting with the environment in order to advance and learn more about their surroundings.

The game focuses on puzzle solving and the unraveling of a continuous story that require the player to use the environment in various ways, such as pushing boxes around, destroying floors, manipulating chemicals, using automated guns and activating terminals and trigger beams.

However, the core of the game requires the player to time travel back in time, and interact with his past selves in order to solve a puzzle. Doing so might cause a temporal paradox that may create an impossible situation - however the game allows these transgressions and only gives a score penalty for such acts - often resulting in a butterfly effect.

== Online rankings ==
Temporal features an online leader-board that allows players to upload their records and compete with each other, trying to find faster and better ways to solve the puzzles of the game. The leader-boards can be accessed from the official site of the game.

== Game replays ==
A built-in feature of the game records players as they play it, letting them share their unique solutions for the puzzles with other players, and also enable the player the ability to play against an existing replay to improve their current score.

== Reception ==
Elena Santos of website Softonic commented "If you like original platform games, you will love Temporal – even if it requires more thinking than just a standard platform game."
