= Warning Forever =

2003 video game

- The Ise-One boss
- Publisher: Hikware
- Designer: Hikoza T Ohkubo
- Platform: Windows
- Release: July 24, 2003
- Genre: Fixed shooter
- Mode: Single-player

Warning Forever is a freeware fixed shooter for Microsoft Windows written by Japanese developer Hikoza T Ohkubo and released under the name of his software house, Hikware.

== Gameplay ==
The game is broken into stages; each stage is a single boss battle, resulting in a constant stream of bosses. To progress to the next stage, the boss must be completely destroyed within the time limit. The game starts with a default time limit of 180 seconds, with 30 seconds rewarded for every boss defeated and 20 seconds lost for each time the player is destroyed.

The player flies a small green ship. There are no power-ups - the player's only weapon is a very rapid-fire revolving cannon which is fired by holding down the shoot button (Z key by default). By default, it fires straight ahead with a small spread. Alternatively, after the switch button (D key by default) is pressed, a green arc is displayed originating from the ship and widening as distance increases. This arc represents the spread of the weapon fire and does not change while the weapon is firing. It can, however, be modified based on the ship's motion while not firing. The arc will rotate slowly to face the direction opposite the ship's motion. Also, the arc will widen as the player moves toward the enemy and vice versa.

The main gameplay feature is the bosses change from stage to stage. Based on how a boss is destroyed, the next boss will adapt itself to defend against previously used strategies and force the player to change tactics. For example, if the front section of one boss is destroyed the next boss will have increased armor in that area. If the player's ship is hit by a certain kind of weapon, but still defeats the boss, the next boss is likely to have more weapons of that type.

The game does not include music, but provides instructions in the read me file on how to provide one's own music. It also includes sound effects.

== Reception ==
Download.com awarded the game a 5-star editor's rating and described the game as a classic in the making, "Warning Forever will entice nearly every gamer who enjoys a space shootout". The staff of Computer Gaming World, writing for gaming blog 1up.com said "This game is among the most addictive platform shooters in the business". Eurogamer's Jim Rossignol named Warning Forever among a top 20 list of Summer of PC Freeware games in 2006. Other reviews are from IGN and Rock, Paper, Shotgun. This game is part of the permanent collection of the travelling exhibition Game On 2.0, shown for instance in the Ontario Science Centre 2013, as example in the category Indie games.
