= Boss (video games) =

Significant and especially strong opponent in video games

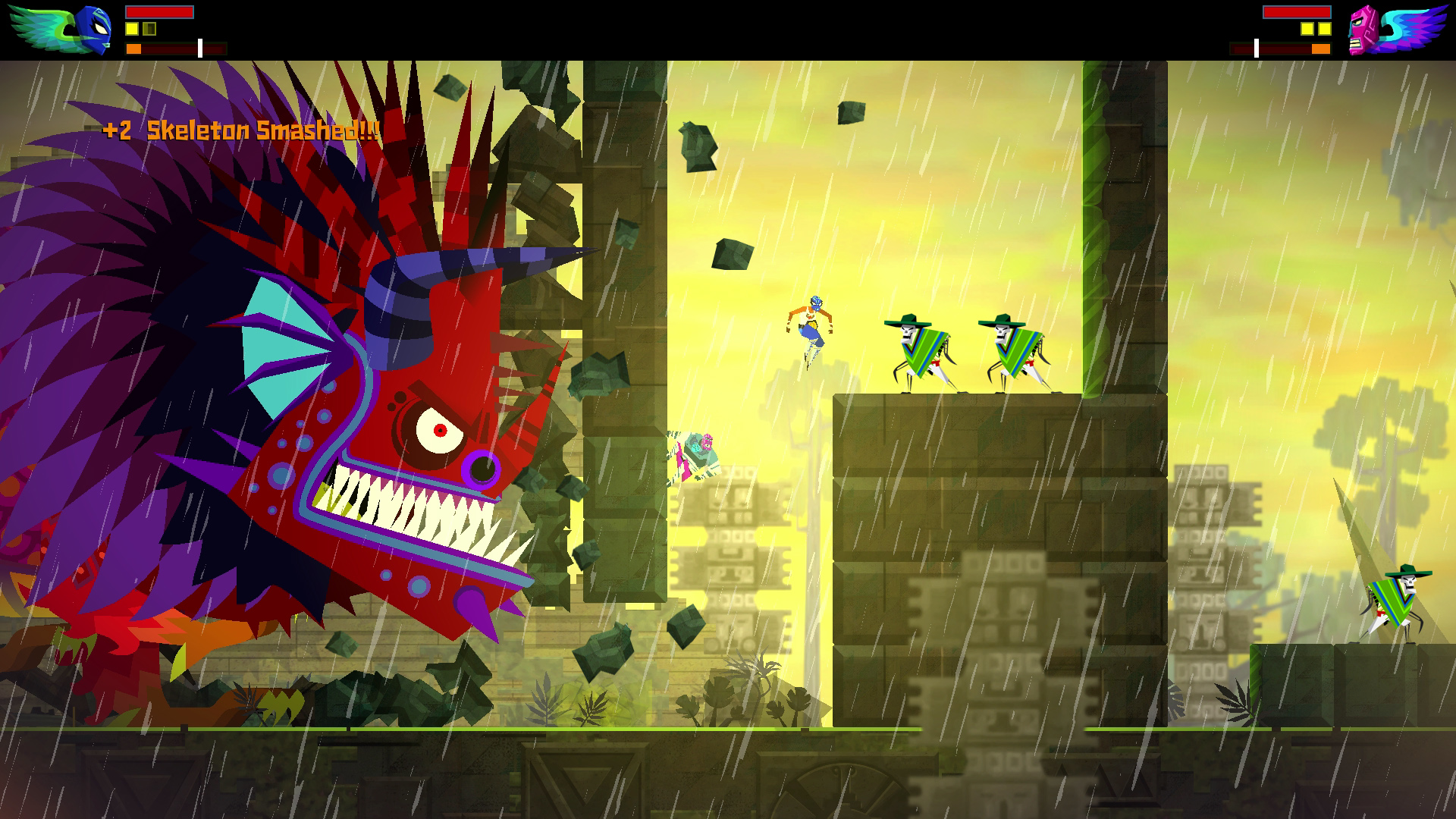
A boss fight from Guacamelee! in which the player characters must keep ahead of the boss, a giant rampaging creature, on the left while dodging obstacles and other enemies

In video games, a boss is a significantly powerful enemy non-player character created as a major opponent to players. A fight with a boss character is referred to as a boss battle, boss fight, boss level, or a boss stage. Bosses are generally far stronger than other opponents the players have faced up to that point in a game. Boss battles are generally seen at climax points of particular sections of games, such as at the end of a level or stage or guarding a specific objective. A miniboss is a boss weaker or less significant than the main boss in the same area or level, though usually more powerful than the standard opponents and often fought alongside them. A superboss is a boss enemy that is optional to fight, sometimes being hidden away and requiring a sequence of tasks to find, and generally much more powerful than the bosses encountered as part of the main game's plot. A final boss is often the main antagonist of a game's story and the defeat of that character usually provides a conclusion to the game. A boss rush is a stage where players face multiple previous bosses again in succession.

For example, in a run 'n' gun video game, all regular enemies might use pistols while the boss uses a tank. A boss enemy is quite often larger in size than other enemies and the player character. At times, bosses are very hard to defeat without being adequately prepared and/or knowing the correct fighting approach. Bosses usually take strategy and special knowledge to defeat, such as how to attack weak points or avoid specific attacks.

Bosses are common in many genres of video games, but they are especially common in story-driven titles, and are commonly previously established characters in the video game's narrative (usually antagonists, but these fights are also used to introduce plot-twists). Action-adventure games, beat 'em ups, fighting games, platform games, role-playing video games (RPGs), and shooter games are particularly associated with boss battles. They may be less common in puzzle games, card video games, racing games, and simulation games. The first video game with a boss fight was the 1975 RPG dnd.

The concept has expanded to other genres, like rhythm games, where there may be a "boss song" that is more difficult, or a high-difficulty, computer-controlled opponent in sports games. In multiplayer online battle arena games, defeating a map boss usually requires teamwork of two or more players, but it brings various benefits to the team, such as buffs or lane push power. Some games, such as Cuphead, Furi and Warning Forever, are centered around continual boss fights.

== Characteristics ==
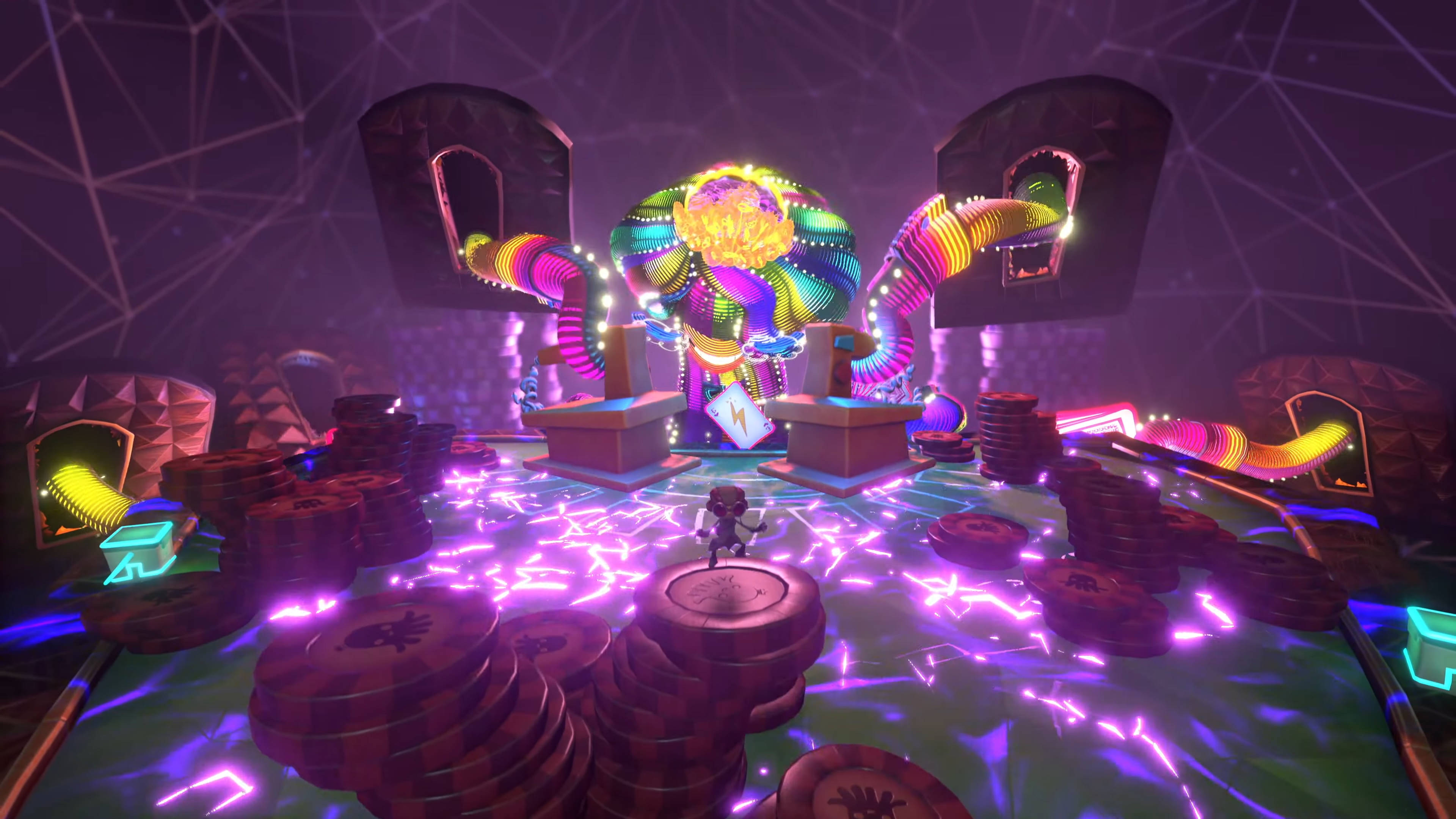
Boss battle in Psychonauts 2

Bosses are usually harder to beat than regular enemies, have higher health points, hence can sustain more damage and are generally found at the end of a level or area. While most games include a mixture of boss opponents and regular opponents, some games have only regular opponents and some games have only bosses (e.g. Shadow of the Colossus). Some bosses are encountered several times through a single game, typically with alternate attacks and a different strategy required to defeat it each time. A boss battle can also be made more challenging if the boss in question becomes progressively stronger and/or less vulnerable as their health decreases, requiring players to use different strategies to win. Some bosses may contain or be composed of smaller parts that can be destroyed by players in battle, which may or may not grant an advantage. In games such as Doom and Castlevania: Symphony of the Night, an enemy may be introduced via a boss battle, but later appear as a regular enemy, after players have become stronger or had a chance to find more powerful weaponry.

Many games structure boss battles as a progression of distinct phases in which the boss produces different or additional hazards for players. This is often reflected by a change in the appearance of the boss, or by a boss displaying increased frustration.

The Legend of Zelda series and games inspired by it are recognized for having dungeons with bosses that are specifically vulnerable to a special item that is located within that dungeon. Player(s) will typically acquire this item while exploring the dungeon and will be given opportunities to learn to use it to solve puzzles or defeat weaker enemies before facing the dungeon's final boss.

Boss battles are typically seen as dramatic events. As such, they are usually characterized by sometimes quite theatrical cutscenes before and after the boss battle and unique music. Recurring bosses and final bosses may have their own specific theme music to distinguish them from other boss battles. This concept extends beyond combat-oriented video games. For example, a number of titles in the Dance Dance Revolution rhythm game series contain "boss songs" that are called "bosses" because they are exceptionally difficult to perform on.

In combat-focused games, a boss may summon additional enemies, reinforcements, or minions ("adds") to fight players alongside the boss, increasing the boss fight's difficulty. These additional enemies may distract from the boss battle or give time for the boss to regain or regenerate health, but may also give players opportunity to regain health from health boosters and ammo dropped by the boss's defeated minions.

== Specific boss types ==
=== Miniboss ===
A miniboss, also known as a "middle boss", "mid-boss", "half-boss", "sub-boss" "semi-boss", or occasionally "guardian" (when the miniboss is protecting an important item), is a boss-like enemy weaker or less significant than the main boss in the same area or level. Some minibosses are stronger versions of regular enemies, as in the Kirby games. Others may be a recurring version of a previous boss, who is either weaker than previously encountered or is less of a challenge later in the game due to character or equipment progression. An example is Castlevania: Symphony of the Night's Gaibon and Slogra. Other video game characters who usually take the role of a miniboss are RT-55J (Mega Man X series), Allen O'Neil (Metal Slug), and Dark Link (The Legend of Zelda series).

=== Superboss ===
A superboss is a type of boss most commonly found in role-playing video games. They are considered optional enemies and do not have to be defeated to complete the game. However, not all optional bosses are superbosses. They are generally much more powerful than the bosses encountered as part of the main game's plot or quest, more difficult even than the final boss and often players are required to meet certain conditions in the game or complete a sidequest or the entire game to fight the superboss. Though what qualifies as the earliest superboss is unclear, the concept dates back to at least the late 1980s with the optional bosses Warmech in Final Fantasy and the Night Terror in Wasteland. In Final Fantasy VII, players may choose to seek out and fight the Ruby and Emerald Weapons. Some superbosses will take the place of the final boss if certain requirements are met. Some superbosses can yield special items or skills that cannot be found any other way that can give players a significant advantage during playthrough of the rest of the game, such as added experience or an extremely powerful weapon. For example, the "raid bosses" from Borderlands 2 give rare loot unavailable anywhere else. Some superbosses in online games have an immense amount of health and must be defeated within a time limit by having a large number of players or parties working together to defeat the boss. Examples of such superbosses can be found in games like Pokémon Go and World of Warcraft, and are generally referred to as a raid. Toby Fox's games Undertale and Deltarune both feature superbosses. In each act of Ultrakill, achieving a perfect rank in every level unlocks a secret level containing an exceptionally challenging boss in the form of a Prime Soul. Some video game series have recurring superbosses, such as the Ultima Weapon and Omega Weapon in Final Fantasy and the Amon clan in Yakuza.

=== Wolfpack boss ===
A wolfpack boss is a group of enemies who may be considered weak on their own, but in large groups can be considered strong enough to be a boss. They come in many variations, such as the Chargin' Chuck Corps encountered in Mario & Luigi: Paper Jam, the Armos Knights from The Legend of Zelda: A Link to the Past or the Battle of 1000 Heartless from Kingdom Hearts II. A main requirement with most wolfpacks is that the whole group must be defeated in order to win; in order to prolong the fight, many wolfpacks, particularly in games with turn-based combat in lieu of real-time, will summon reinforcements to replenish their lost numbers. An example of this is Astaroth in Diablo IV. Many other wolfpack bosses empower themselves when one of the other enemies in the battle is killed to keep the threat level from falling over time.

=== Final boss ===
The final boss, last boss or end boss, is typically present at or near the end of a game, with completion of the game's storyline usually following victory in the battle. The final boss is usually the main antagonist of the game; however, there are exceptions, such as in Conker's Bad Fur Day, in which the final boss, Heinrich, is the alien pet of the antagonist, Professor Von Kriplespac. In Mario & Luigi: Brothership, Zokket serves as the main antagonist, but the final boss is Reclusa, the overarching antagonist. Final bosses are generally larger, more detailed or better animated than lesser enemies, often in order to inspire a feeling of grandeur and special significance from the encounter.

In some games, a hidden boss, referred to as the "true" final boss, is present. These bosses only appear after the completion of specific additional levels, choosing specific dialogue options or after obtaining a particular item or set of items, such as the Chaos Emeralds in the Sonic the Hedgehog series or performing a series of tasks in Metal Gear Solid: Peace Walker. These bosses are generally more difficult to defeat. In games with a "true" final boss, victory leads to either a better ending or a more detailed version of the regular ending. Examples of a "true final boss" include the Radiance in Hollow Knight and the Moon Presence in Bloodborne.

The term "Foozle" is used to describe a cliché final boss that exists only to act as the final problem before players can complete the game. Scorpia stated in 1994 that "about 98% of all role-playing video games can be summed up as follows: 'We go out and bash on critters until we're strong enough to go bash on Foozle.'"

== History ==
The origin of video game boss fights can be traced to film, such as Bruce Lee's Hong Kong martial arts films, including The Big Boss (1971), in which Lee fights a criminal gang before battling the eponymous "big boss", and Game of Death (1972), where Lee fights a different boss on each level of a pagoda, which later inspired the boss battles of martial arts action games such as beat 'em ups. Video game bosses also take inspiration from tabletop role-playing games, such as Dungeons & Dragons (1974), in which a typical dungeon campaign would feature one powerful enemy acting as the boss of the weaker minions that players would face beforehand.

The first interactive video game to feature a boss was dnd, which was released in 1975 for the PLATO system. dnd was one of the earliest dungeon crawl video games and implemented many of the core concepts of Dungeons & Dragons. The objective of the game is to retrieve an "orb" from the bottommost dungeon, which is kept in a treasure room guarded by a high-level enemy named the Gold Dragon. Only by defeating the Dragon can players claim the orb, complete the game and be eligible to appear on the high score list.

In 1980, boss battles appeared in several arcade action games. In March 1980, Sega released Samurai, a jidaigeki-themed martial arts action game where player fights a number of swordspeople before confronting a more powerful samurai boss. SNK's Sasuke vs. Commander, released in October 1980, is a ninja-themed shooting game where the player character fights enemy ninjas before confronting bosses with various ninjutsu attacks and enemy patterns. It was one of the earliest games with multiple boss encounters. Phoenix, released in December 1980, is a fixed shooter where the player's ship must fight a giant mothership in the fifth and final level. At several points in Namco's 1982 vertically scrolling shooter, Xevious, players must defeat an Andor Genesis mothership to advance.

In side-scrolling character action games, such as beat 'em ups, Irem's 1984 arcade game Kung-Fu Master established the end-of-level boss battle structure used in these games, with players progressing through levels (represented by floors of a temple) and fighting a boss character at the end of each level; in turn, this end-of-level boss battle structure was adapted from the Bruce Lee film Game of Death, where Lee's character fights a different boss character on each floor as he ascends a pagoda. The game was distinctive for giving both players and each boss a health meter, which leads to the game temporarily becoming a one-on-one fighting game during boss battles, a concept that Kung-Fu Master designer Takashi Nishiyama later expanded on when he created the fighting game Street Fighter (1987) at Capcom. The term "boss" was used in reference to the game's final boss by Mike Roberts in a review of the game published in the May 1985 issue of British magazine Computer Gamer, while he used the term "super baddies" for the end-of-level bosses.

Sega's arcade game Fantasy Zone (1986) popularized the concept of a boss rush, a stage where players face multiple previous bosses again in succession.

=== Etymology ===
Michael Fahey of Kotaku noted in a podcast that usage of the term "boss" by Nintendo Power grew sharply around 1988, and that there was no clear single etymology of the term. In the same podcast, former Kotaku editor-in-chief Stephen Totilo speculated that bosses became known as such because they were "in charge of all the enemies".

== See also ==
- Glossary of video game terms
