= List of roguelikes =

The following is a comprehensive index of commercial roguelike video games, sorted chronologically by year. Information regarding release platform, release type, genre subtype, game setting, developers, and publishers is provided where available. The table can be sorted by clicking on the small boxes next to the column headings.

Roguelike games are those that incorporate elements of turn-based role-playing games with procedural generation and permadeath, following the formula of the genre's namesake, Rogue. Additionally, many other variations on this concept exist that do not always include turn-based order or role-playing elements, but maintain the use of procedural generation and permadeath, along with metaprogression. Such games are often referred to as roguelite games, though there is no well-agreed distinction between these terms.

The following list includes games referred to as both roguelike and roguelite.

== Legend ==
Video game platforms
3DS	Nintendo 3DS, 3DS Virtual Console, iQue 3DS	AMI	Amiga	APPII	Apple II
ATR	Atari 8-bit computers	BEOS	BeOS, including Haiku	C64	Commodore 64
CP/M	CP/M	DC	Dreamcast	DEC	DEC Professional
DOS	PC DOS / MS-DOS, Windows 3.X	DROID	Android	DS	Nintendo DS, DSiWare, iQue DS
FM7	FM-7	GB	Game Boy	GBA	Game Boy Advance, iQue GBA
GBC	Game Boy Color	GEN	Genesis / Mega Drive	GG	Game Gear
INT	Intellivision	iOS	iOS, iPhone, iPod, iPadOS, iPad, visionOS, Apple Vision Pro	LIN	Linux, SteamOS
MAC	Classic Mac OS, 2001 and before	MOBI	Mobile phone	N64	Nintendo 64, iQue Player
NS	Nintendo Switch	NS2	Nintendo Switch 2	OS2	OS/2
OSX	macOS	PALM	Palm OS	PC88	PC-8800 series
PC98	PC-9800 series	PET	Commodore PET	PLATO	PLATO
PPC	Pocket PC	PS1	PlayStation 1	PS2	PlayStation 2
PS3	PlayStation 3	PS4	PlayStation 4	PS5	PlayStation 5
PSP	PlayStation Portable	PSV	PlayStation Vita	SAT	Sega Saturn
SMS	Master System	SNES	Super NES / Super Famicom / Super Comboy	TRS80	TRS-80
VIC20	VIC-20	Wii	Wii, WiiWare, Wii Virtual Console	WiiU	Wii U, WiiU Virtual Console
WIN	Windows, all versions Windows 95 and up	WS	WonderSwan	XB360	Xbox 360, Xbox 360 Live Arcade
XBO	Xbox One	XBX/S	Xbox Series X/S	ZX	ZX Spectrum

Video game genres
Action	Action game	Action RPG	Action role-playing game	Action-adventure	Action-adventure game
Adventure	Adventure game	Bullet heaven	Vampire Survivors–like	Bullet hell	Bullet hell
CMS	Construction and management simulation	Deck building	Deck building game	Dungeon crawl	Dungeon crawl
FPS	First-person shooter	Hack and slash	Hack and slash	Metroidvania	Metroidvania
Platformer	Platformer	Puzzle	Puzzle video game	Rhythm	Rhythm game
RPG	Role-playing video game	RTS	Real-time strategy	Shoot 'em up	Shoot 'em up
Simulation	Simulation video game	Stealth	Stealth game	Strategy	Strategy video game
Survival	Survival game	Survival horror	Survival horror	TBS	Turn-based strategy
TBT	Turn-based tactics	Tower defense	Tower defense	TPS	Third-person shooter

== List ==
First	Last	Title	Platform	Roguelike type	Setting	Developer	Publisher	Ref.
1975	1985	dnd	PLATO	RPG	Fantasy	Gary Whisenhunt, Ray Wood		
1975		pedit5	PLATO	Dungeon crawl	Fantasy	Rusty Rutherford		
1978		Beneath Apple Manor	APPII	RPG	Fantasy	Don Worth		
1979		DUNGEON	PET	RPG	Fantasy	Brian Sawyer		
1979		Mines of Mordor	TRS80	RPG	Fantasy	Scott Cunningham, Electronic Imaginations		
1980		Rogue		Dungeon crawl	Fantasy	Michael Toy, others		
1982		Advanced Dungeons & Dragons: Cloudy Mountain	INT		Fantasy	Mattel Electronics		
1982		Hack			Fantasy	Jay Fenlason, Andries Brouwer, others		
1982		Nemesis	CP/M		Fantasy	Michael Q. Hiller & Michael A. Pagels		
1982		Sword of Fargoal	C64, PET, VIC20, iOS	Adventure	Fantasy	Jeff McCord		
1982		Telengard	APPII, ATR, C64, FM7, PC88, PC98, TRS80	Dungeon crawl	Fantasy	Daniel Lawrence		
1983		Advanced Dungeons & Dragons: Treasure of Tarmin	INT		Fantasy	Mattel Electronics		
1983	2021	Moria			Fantasy	Robert Alan Koeneke, Jimmey Wayne Todd, James E. Wilson		
1983		Mystic Tower	ZX		Fantasy	Aardvark Software		
1984		Castle Adventure	DOS	Dungeon crawl, Adventure	Fantasy	Kevin Bales		
1985	1987	The Dungeon Revealed / The Dungeon of Doom	MAC	Dungeon crawl	Fantasy	John Raymonds		
1985		Island of Kesmai			Fantasy	John Taylor, Kelton Flinn		
1986	1987	Larn			Fantasy	Noah Morgan, Phil Cordier		
1987	2026	NetHack			Fantasy	The NetHack DevTeam		
1987	2010	Omega			Fantasy	Laurence Brothers		
1987	1992	Scarab of Ra	MAC		Modern, Fantasy	Rick Holzgrafe		
1987		Tower of Doom	INT		Fantasy	INTV Corporation		
1988		Moraff's Revenge	DOS	Dungeon crawl	Fantasy	Steve Moraff		
1989		Castle of the Winds	DOS		Fantasy	SaadaSoft		
1990	2025	Angband			Fantasy	Alex Cutler, Andy Astrand		
1990		Dragon Crystal	GG, SMS		Fantasy	Sega		
1990		Fatal Labyrinth	GEN		Fantasy	Sega		
1991		Cave Noire	GB	Dungeon crawl	Fantasy	Konami		
1991		Gang Wars (Note: Not to be confused with the 1989 game of the same name)	MAC	RPG	Modern	Doerr Bros Software		
1991		Moraff's World	DOS		Fantasy	Steve Moraff		
1991		ToeJam & Earl	GEN	Action	Surrealistic, Urban, Sci-fi	Johnson Voorsanger Productions		
1992		Mission Thunderbolt	DEC, MAC, WIN		Futuristic	Dave Scheifler, John Calhoun		
1992	1995	Ragnarok	DOS	RPG	Fantasy	Norsehelm		
1992	2023	UnReal World	DOS, LIN, OSX, WIN	Survival	Historical	Sami Maaranen		
1993		Dungeon Hack	DOS	Dungeon crawl	Fantasy	DreamForge		
1993		Dungeons of the Unforgiven	DOS		Fantasy	Steve Moraff		
1993		Quenzar's Caverns	WIN		Fantasy	Pulse Ventures Ltd.		
1993		Torneko's Great Adventure: Mystery Dungeon	SNES	RPG	Fantasy	Chunsoft		
1994	2018	Ancient Domains of Mystery	AMI, BEOS, DOS, LIN, OS2, OSX, WIN		Fantasy	Thomas Biskup		
1994	1994	Blade	AMI		Fantasy	Mark Sheeky		
1994	1994	Hilt: Against The Hoardes	AMI		Fantasy	Mark Sheeky		
1994	2012	World of Arch	AMI, WIN		Fantasy	I.A. Jääskeläinen		
1994	2004	Zangband			Fantasy	Topi Ylinen		
1995		Alphaman	DOS		Sci-fi, Post-apocalyptic	Jeffrey R. Olson		
1995	2010	Caverns of Xaskazien	DOS, WIN		Fantasy	Jeff Sinasac		
1995	2008	Mystery Dungeon: Shiren the Wanderer	DS, SNES, iOS, DROID	RPG	Fantasy	Chunsoft		
1995		The Sorcerer's Cave	WIN		Fantasy	Peter Donnelly/Skookum		
1996		Diablo	WIN, MAC, PS1	Action RPG	Fantasy	Blizzard North		
1996	2011	Shiren the Wanderer GB: Monster of Moonlight Village	GB, WIN, DROID	RPG	Fantasy	Chunsoft		
1997	1999	Chocobo's Mysterious Dungeon	PS1, WS	RPG	Fantasy	Square		
1997	2005	Linley's Dungeon Crawl		Dungeon crawl	Fantasy	Linley Henzell		
1997	2020	MAngband	LIN, OSX, WIN		Fantasy	Keldon Jones, others		
1997	2006	Slash'EM			Fantasy	The Slash'EM development team		
1998	2000	Azure Dreams	GBC, PS1		Fantasy	Konami		
1998	2008	Baroque	PS1, PS2, SAT, Wii		Fantasy	Sting		
1998		Chocobo's Dungeon 2	PS1	RPG	Fantasy	Square		
1998		Sorvice	SAT		Fantasy	Altron		
1998	2008	Tales (or Troubles) of Middle Earth			Fantasy	DarkGod, others		
1998		Waku Waku Puyo Puyo Dungeon	SAT		Fantasy	Compile		
1999		Master Blaze	WIN		Fantasy	Nihon Create		
1999	2001	Torneko: The Last Hope	GBA, PS1	RPG	Fantasy	Chunsoft		
1999		Waku Waku Puyo Puyo Dungeon Ketteiban	PS1		Fantasy	Compile		
2000	2001	Dark Cloud	PS2, PS4	Action RPG	Fantasy	Level-5		
2000	2001	Falcon's Eye			Fantasy	Jaakko Peltonen		
2000		Shiren the Wanderer 2: Shiren's Castle and the Oni Invasion	N64	RPG	Fantasy	Chunsoft		
2001	2018	Iter Vehemens ad Necem	DOS, LIN, OSX, WIN		Fantasy	Timo Kiviluoto, others		
2001	2011	Lost Labyrinth	WIN, LIN		Fantasy			
2001	2008	Shiren the Wanderer GB2: Magic Castle of the Desert	GBC, DS	RPG	Fantasy	Chunsoft		
2001	2021	TomeNET	LIN, OSX, WIN		Fantasy	C. Blue, Mikael, others		
2002	2003	Dark Chronicle/Dark Cloud 2	PS2, PS4	Action RPG	Fantasy	Level-5		
2002	2013	DRL			Futuristic, Fantasy	Kornel Kisielewicz		
2002	2004	Shiren the Wanderer Gaiden: Asuka the Swordswoman	DC, WIN	RPG	Fantasy	Chunsoft		
2002	2004	Eternal Quest (Note: Known as Simple 2000 Series Vol. 20: The Dungeon RPG in Japan)	PS2		Fantasy, Historical	Tamsoft		
2002	2020	Strange Adventures In Infinite Space	WIN, MAC, LIN, PALM, PPC		Sci-fi	Rich Carlson, Iikka Keränen		
2002	2004	Torneko's Great Adventure 3	GBA, PS2	RPG	Fantasy	Chunsoft		
2003	2015	Dragonslayer	WIN		Fantasy	Walter Pullen		
2003	2025	Flatspace	WIN		Sci-fi	Mark Sheeky		
2003	2011	POWDER	DS, GBA, iOS, LIN, OSX, PS3, PSP, Wii, WIN		Fantasy	Jeff Lait		
2004		Kidō Senshi Gundam: Fushigi no Dungeon	MOBI (i-mode)	RPG	Futuristic	Chunsoft		
2004		The Nightmare of Druaga: Fushigi no Dungeon	PS2	RPG	Fantasy	Arika, Chunsoft		
2004		TwinBee Dungeon	MOBI	RPG	Fantasy	Konami		
2005		Pokémon Mystery Dungeon: Blue Rescue Team and Red Rescue Team	Red Rescue Team: GBA; Blue Rescue Team: DS	RPG	Modern, Fantasy	Chunsoft		
2005	2006	Tao's Adventure: Curse of the Demon Seal	DS		Fantasy	Konami		
2005	2021	Weird Worlds: Return to Infinite Space	WIN, MAC, LIN, iOS, DROID		Sci-fi	Rich Carlson, Iikka Keränen		
2006		Dragon Quest: Young Yangus and the Mystery Dungeon	PS2	RPG	Fantasy	Cavia		
2006	2024	Dungeon Crawl Stone Soup		Dungeon crawl	Fantasy	Community		
2006		Izuna: Legend of the Unemployed Ninja	DS		Fantasy	Success		
2006	2022	Dwarf Fortress	LIN, OSX, WIN	CMS	Fantasy	Tarn Adams		
2007	2024	Caves of Qud	LIN, OSX, WIN	RPG	Post-apocalyptic, Sci-fi, Fantasy	Freehold Games		
2007	2008	Izuna 2: The Unemployed Ninja Returns	DS		Fantasy	Ninja Studio		
2007		Pokémon Mystery Dungeon: Explorers of Time and Explorers of Darkness	DS	RPG	Modern, Fantasy	Chunsoft		
2007	2021	PWMAngband	WIN, LIN		Fantasy	PowerWyrm		
2007		Rogue Hearts Dungeon	PS2		Fantasy	Compile Heart		
2008		Dramatic Dungeon Sakura Taisen	DS		Fantasy	Neverland		
2008		Dungeon of Windaria	DS		Fantasy	Compile Heart		
2008	2019	Final Fantasy Fables: Chocobo's Dungeon	Wii, DS, NS, PS4	RPG	Fantasy	Square Enix		
2008	2010	Shiren the Wanderer	PSP, Wii		Fantasy	Chunsoft		
2009	2018	Brogue	LIN, MAC, WIN		Fantasy	Brian Walker		
2009		Mines of Morgoth	WIN		Fantasy	Moongate Software		
2009		Pokémon Fushigi no Dungeon Ikuzo! Arashi no Bōken-dan	Wii	RPG	Modern, Fantasy	Chunsoft		
2009		Pokémon Fushigi no Dungeon Mezase! Hikari no Bōken-dan	Wii	RPG	Modern, Fantasy	Chunsoft		
2009		Pokémon Fushigi no Dungeon Susume! Honō no Bōken-dan	Wii	RPG	Modern, Fantasy	Chunsoft		
2009		Pokémon Mystery Dungeon: Explorers of Sky	DS	RPG	Modern, Fantasy	Chunsoft		
2009	2012	Spelunky	WIN, XB360	Platformer	Fantasy	Derek Yu, Andy Hull		
2010		100 Rogues	iOS		Fantasy	Dinofarm Games		
2010		Caverns of Xaskazien II	WIN		Fantasy	Jeff Sinasac		
2010	2012	Shiren the Wanderer 4: The Eye of God and the Devil's Navel	DS, PSP	RPG	Fantasy	Chunsoft		
2010	2022	Shiren the Wanderer: The Tower of Fortune and the Dice of Fate	DS, PSV, NS, WIN, iOS, DROID	RPG	Fantasy	Chunsoft		
2010		Smart Kobold	WIN, LIN		Fantasy	Jeff Lait		
2010		Z.H.P. Unlosing Ranger VS Darkdeath Evilman	PSP		Fantasy	Nippon Ichi Software		
2011		The Binding of Isaac	3DS, WIN, LIN, OSX, NS	Action-adventure, Dungeon crawl	Surrealistic, Horror	Edmund McMillen, Florian Himsl		
2011		Deadly Dungeons	DROID	Dungeon crawl	Fantasy	CodeZombie Games		
2011		Dungeons of Dredmor	LIN, OSX, WIN		Fantasy	Gaslamp Games		
2011		HyperRogue	LIN, OSX, WIN, DROID		Fantasy	Zeno Rogue		
2011		Tales of Maj'Eyal	LIN, OSX, WIN	RPG	Fantasy	Netcore Games		
2012	2014	Battlepaths	XB360, WIN, LIN		Fantasy	Gamedevel		
2012	2025	Cogmind	WIN	RPG	Sci-fi	Josh Ge		
2012		Dungelot	iOS, DROID		Fantasy	Red Winter Software		
2012		FTL: Faster Than Light	WIN, LIN, OSX, iOS	Strategy	Sci-fi	Subset Games		
2012	2015	Pixel Dungeon	DROID, iOS		Fantasy	Oleg Dolya		
2012		Pokémon Mystery Dungeon: Gates to Infinity	3DS	RPG	Modern, Fantasy	Spike Chunsoft		
2012	2015	Ultima Ratio Regum	WIN	Puzzle	Historical	Mark R Johnson		
2013		99 Levels to Hell	WIN, OSX, LIN	Platformer	Fantasy	ZaxisGames		
2013	2023	Cataclysm: Dark Days Ahead	iOS, LIN, OSX, WIN	Survival horror	Post-apocalyptic	Kevin Granade		
2013		Delver	WIN, OSX, LIN, DROID	Dungeon crawl	Fantasy	Priority Interrupt		
2013		Don't Starve	WIN, OSX, LIN, NS	Survival	Fantasy	Klei Entertainment		
2013		The Guided Fate Paradox	PS3		Fantasy	Nippon Ichi Software		
2013		Hoplite	DROID		Fantasy	Douglas Cowley		
2013		Not the Robots	WIN		Sci-fi	2DArray		
2013		Risk of Rain	WIN, OSX, LIN, PS4, PSV, NS, XBO	Platformer	Sci-fi	Hopoo Games		
2013		Rogue Legacy	WIN, OSX, LIN, PS3, PS4, PSV, XBO, NS	Metroidvania	Fantasy	Cellar Door Games		
2013		Sword of the Stars: The Pit	WIN	Dungeon crawl	Sci-fi	Kerberos Productions		
2013	2015	TowerClimb	WIN	Platformer	Fantasy	Davioware & Quazi		
2013		WazHack	DROID, iOS, LIN, OSX, WIN	Dungeon crawl	Fantasy	Warwick "Waz" Allison		
2013		Wizards Encounters	DROID	RPG	Fantasy	Alderan gaming		
2014		The Binding of Isaac: Rebirth	WIN, OSX, LIN, PS4, PSV, WiiU, XBO, 3DS, NS	Action-adventure, Dungeon crawl	Fantasy	Nicalis		
2014		Crypt of the Necrodancer	WIN, OSX, LIN, XBO, NS	Rhythm	Fantasy	Brace Yourself Games		
2014	2020	DragonFang: Drahn's Mystery Dungeon	DROID, iOS, WIN, 3DS	RPG	Fantasy	Toydea		
2014		Dungeon of the Endless	WIN, OSX, NS	Tower defense	Sci-fi	Amplitude Studios		
2014	2017	Golden Krone Hotel	WIN, OSX	RPG	Fantasy	Vulgat		
2014		Invisible, Inc.	WIN, OSX, LIN, NS	TBT, Stealth	Espionage	Klei Entertainment		
2014	2017	Quest of Dungeons	DROID, iOS, 3DS, LIN, OSX, WIN, WiiU, PS4, XBO, NS		Fantasy	Upfall Studios		
2014		Road Not Taken	WIN, OSX, PS4, iOS, DROID	Puzzle	Fantasy	Spry Fox		
2014	2020	Slash'EM Extended	LIN, WIN		Fantasy	Amy Bluescreenofdeath		
2014		TinyKeep	WIN		Fantasy	Phigames		
2014		Tower of Guns	WIN, OSX, LIN	FPS	Sci-fi	Terrible Posture Games		
2015		Captain Forever Remix	WIN	Shoot 'em up	Sci-fi	Pixelsaurus Games		
2015		Dragon Fin Soup	LIN, OSX, PS3, PS4, PSV, WIN	RPG	Fantasy	Grimm Bros		
2015		Etrian Mystery Dungeon	3DS	RPG	Fantasy	Spike Chunsoft		
2015		Hand of Fate	WIN, OSX, LIN, PS4, PSV, XBO, NS	Deck building, Action RPG	Fantasy	Defiant Development		
2015	2016	Infinite Space III: Sea of Stars	LIN, OSX, WIN		Sci-fi	Rich Carlson, Iikka Keränen		
2015	2016	Mystery Chronicle: One Way Heroics	PS4, PSV, WIN	RPG	Fantasy	Spike Chunsoft		
2015		Nuclear Throne	WIN, OSX, LIN, PS4, PSV, NS	Bullet hell	Post-apocalyptic	Vlambeer		
2015		Pokémon Super Mystery Dungeon	3DS	RPG	Modern, Fantasy	Spike Chunsoft		
2015		Runestone Keeper	WIN, OSX, iOS, DROID, NS		Fantasy	Blackfire Games		
2015		Skyshine's Bedlam	WIN	TBT, Simulation	Post-apocalyptic	Skyshine Games		
2016		Darkest Dungeon	WIN, OSX, LIN, PS4, XBO, NS, PSV	RPG	Fantasy	Red Hook Studios		
2016		Enter the Gungeon	WIN, OSX, LIN, PS4, NS, XBO	Bullet hell	Sci-fi	Dodge Roll		
2016		FORCED Showdown	WIN, OSX, LIN		Fantasy, Sci-fi	BetaDwarf		
2016		Pixel Cave	iOS, DROID, WIN, OSX		Fantasy	Megabyte		
2016	2017	Rogue Wizards	iOS, OSX, WIN		Fantasy	Spellbind Studios		
2017		Dead Cells	WIN, OSX, LIN, PS4, XBO, NS, DROID	Metroidvania	Fantasy	Motion Twin		
2017		Dragon's Lunch	WIN, LIN, OSX	Dungeon crawl	Fantasy	Abbot Computing Ltd		
2017	2019	DragonFangZ: The Rose & Dungeon of Time	WIN, OSX, NS, PS4, XBO, 3DS		Fantasy	Toydea		
2017		Etrian Mystery Dungeon 2	3DS	RPG	Fantasy	Chunsoft		
2017		Heat Signature	WIN	Action, Stealth	Sci-fi	Suspicious Developments		
2018		Aura of Worlds	WIN	Platformer	Fantasy	Cognitive Forge		
2018		Below	XBO, WIN	Action-adventure		Capybara Games		
2018		FARA	WIN, OSX, LIN		Fantasy	BrianIsCreative		
2018		Heroes of Hammerwatch	WIN, LIN, NS, PS4, XBO	Action-adventure	Fantasy	Crackshell		
2018		KeeperRL	WIN, LIN, OSX	RTS	Fantasy	Michal Brzozowski		
2018		A Legionary's Life	WIN		Historical	Alessandro Roberti		
2018		Lost Labyrinth DX	WIN, LIN, OSX		Fantasy	Johan Jansen		
2018	2021	Rogue Fable III	WIN, OSX, LIN		Fantasy	Justin Wang		
2018		Tangledeep	LIN, OSX, WIN, NS		Fantasy	Impact Gameworks		
2019		Bounty Hunter Space Lizard	DROID, iOS	TBS	Sci-fi	Stay Inside Games		
2019		Dicey Dungeons	WIN, OSX, LIN, NS	Deck building	Fantasy	Terry Cavanagh		
2019		Emberlight	WIN, OSX, LIN	TBS	Adventure	Quarter Onion Games		
2019		Jupiter Hell	LIN, OSX, WIN		Sci-fi	ChaosForge		
2019		Noita	WIN	Platformer	Fantasy	Nolla Games		
2019		REAL – Roguelike Emoji Adventure Legend	DROID		Fantasy	Dario Real		
2019		Rogue Empire: Dungeon Crawler RPG	LIN, OSX, WIN		Fantasy	Portal Entertainment		
2019		Soulash	WIN		Fantasy	Wizards of the Code		
2019	2021	Tangaria	WIN, LIN		Fantasy	Tangar Igroglaz		
2020		Arboria	WIN	Action-adventure	Fantasy	Dreamplant		
2020		BPM: Bullets Per Minute	WIN	FPS, Rhythm	Fantasy	Awe Interactive		
2020		Dawn of the Mexica	LIN, WIN		History, Fantasy	Pablo Barron		
2020		Griftlands	WIN, OSX, NS	Deck building	Fantasy, Sci-fi	Klei Entertainment		
2020		Hades	WIN, NS	Dungeon crawl	Fantasy	Supergiant Games		
2020		Pokémon Mystery Dungeon: Rescue Team DX	NS	RPG	Modern, Fantasy	Spike Chunsoft		
2020		Rakaza Dungeon	iOS, DROID	Action-adventure	Fantasy	Kotic Games		
2020		Risk of Rain 2	WIN, PS4, XBO, NS	TPS	Sci-fi	Hopoo Games		
2020		Rogue Party	iOS, DROID		Fantasy	Nations Software		
2020	2022	Spelunky 2	WIN, XBO, XBX/S, PS4, NS	Platformer	Fantasy	Mossmouth, BlitWorks		
2021		Baalzebub	DROID, iOS, WIN, OSX, LIN	Dungeon crawl	Fantasy, Infernal	Oshikuru.com		
2021		Returnal	PS5	TPS, Bullet hell	Sci-fi, Horror	Housemarque Interactive		
2022	2024	Cult of the Lamb	WIN, OSX, PS4, PS5, XBO, XBX/S, NS	CMS	Horror, Fantasy	Massive Monster		
2022	2025	Overworld	DROID, LIN, OSX, WIN	RPG	Fantasy	Red Asteroid Games		
2022		Vampire Survivors	WIN, OSX, XBO, XBX/S, PS4, PS5, NS, DROID, iOS	Bullet heaven	Fantasy	poncle		
2023		Brotato	WIN, PS4, PS5, XBO, XBX/S, NS, DROID, iOS	Bullet heaven	Fantasy	Blobfish		
2023		Dungeons of Shadow Imps	WIN, LIN		Fantasy	Piotr Raczek		
2023		Full Gear	WIN	Dungeon crawl	Fantasy	Dieuwt		
2023		Logical Escape	WIN	Puzzle	Modern	MaitrePhoenix		
2024		Balatro	WIN, OSX, PS4, PS5, XBO, XBX/S, NS, DROID, iOS	Deck building	Modern	LocalThunk		
2024		Hades II	WIN, OSX, NS, NS2	Hack and slash	Fantasy	Supergiant Games		
2024		Path of Achra	WIN		Fantasy	Ulfsire		
2024		Shiren the Wanderer: The Mystery Dungeon of Serpentcoil Island	NS, WIN	RPG	Fantasy	Spike Chunsoft		
2025		Floppy Hack: The Quest for the Sacred Disks	WIN		Modern, Fantasy	Soiree Games		
2025		No-Skin	WIN		Horror	NoEye-Soft		
2025		Nubby's Number Factory	WIN	Strategy	Surrealistic	MogDogBlog Productions		

== Games with roguelike modes ==
The following list contains games with roguelike modes /sections, but whose regular gameplay is not a roguelike

Year	Title	Platform	Roguelike type	Setting	Developer	Publisher	Notes	Ref.
1995	Lufia II: Rise of the Sinistrals (Ancient Cave)	SNES	RPG	Fantasy	Neverland	Taito, Natsume Inc., Nintendo	A late game roguelike mode that lets the player choose teammates, and procedurally generates a 100 Floor dungeon.	
2024	Splatoon 3: Side Order	NS	TPS	Sci-fi	Nintendo EPD	Nintendo	An expansion to Splatoon 3.	
