= Character creation =

Process of defining a character in a role-playing game

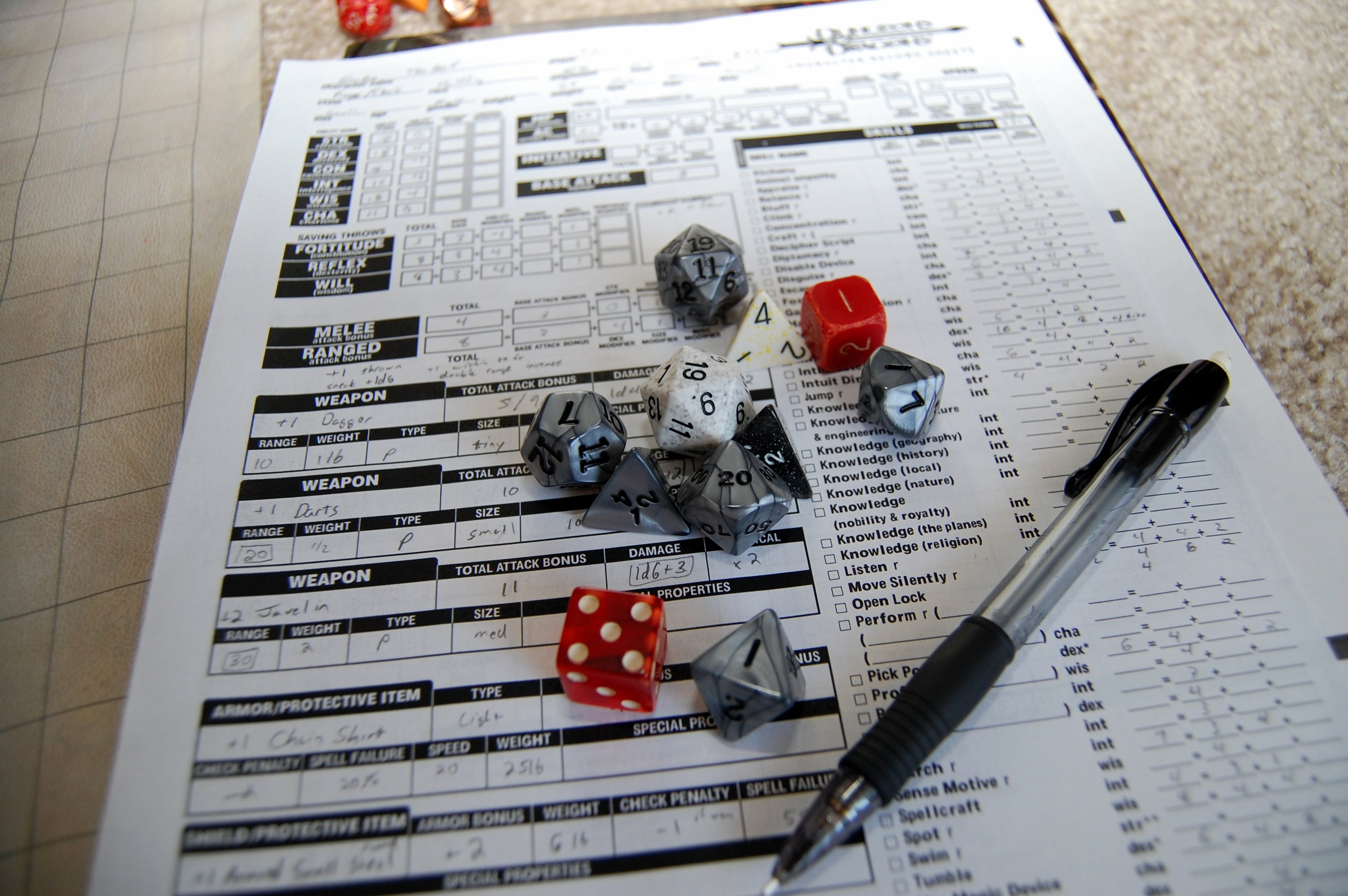
Polyhedral dice and a character sheet

Character creation (also known as character generation or character design) is the process of defining a player character in a role-playing game. The result of character creation is a direct characterization that is recorded on a character sheet. This may include a representation of the character's physical, mental, psychological, and social attributes and skills in terms of the specific game's mechanics.

It may also include informal descriptions of the character's physical appearance, personality, personal back-story ("background"), and possessions. Games with a fantasy setting often include traits such as race, class, or species. Character creation is typically the first step taken by the players (as opposed to a gamemaster) before a game starts.

== Character advancement ==
Character advancement refers to the improvement of a character's statistics later in the game. The player modifies existing statistics and adds new traits, usually by spending experience points or gaining a new experience level. Character advancement typically uses similar rules as character creation.

== Making decisions ==
The process of creating a character requires making decisions about the character's attributes and skills. Each game includes its own procedures for making these decisions.

=== Pre-generated options ===
Some games and campaign settings offer pre-generated character options for beginners or players who prefer to start playing more quickly.

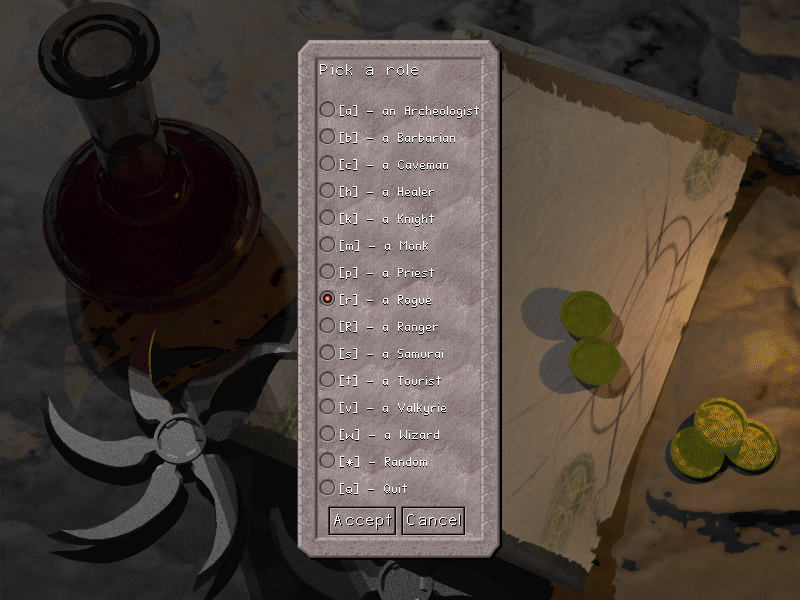
Class selection screen in Falcon's Eye

=== Random choice ===
Random choices are made by rolling dice and either using the result directly or looking it up in a table, depending on the decision that is to be made. A random generation system allows the full range of values to be generated for each statistic, leading to diversity among newly generated characters. However, players have little control over the scores.

=== Player's choice ===
The player makes decisions within defined restrictions. These restrictions may allow players to distribute a number of character points among various statistics. In a point distribution system, higher scores cost more points per level than lower ones, and costs may vary between statistics within a category. Usually, there is an upper and lower limit for each score. Additional constraints may apply, depending on the game's system.

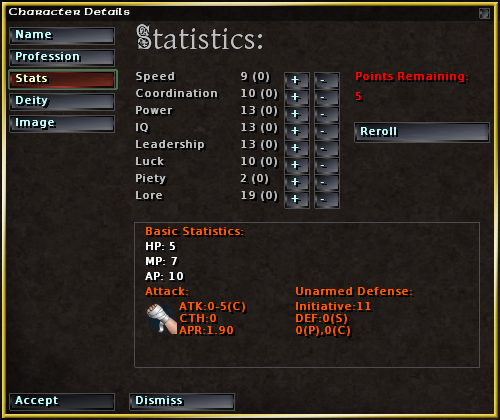
Character creation screen in S.C.O.U.R.G.E.: Heroes of Lesser Renown
