= Weird Worlds =

Weird Worlds can refer to:

- Weird Worlds (comics), a science fiction anthology by DC Comics.
- Weird Worlds, a series of magazines put out by Scholastic Publishing in the late 1970s/early 1980s.
- Weird Worlds: Return to Infinite Space, a science fiction computer game unrelated to the aforementioned comics.
