= Strange Adventures in Infinite Space =

2002 video game

- Developer: Digital Eel
- Publishers: Cheapass Games; Astraware
- Designers: Rich Carlson; Iikka Keränen
- Programmer: Iikka Keränen
- Artist: Bill Sears
- Composer: Rich Carlson
- Series: Infinite Space
- Engine: Proprietary
- Platforms: Microsoft Windows, macOS, Classic Mac OS, Palm Pilot, Linux
- Release: March 15, 2002
- Genre: Roguelike
- Mode: Single-player

Strange Adventures In Infinite Space is a roguelike video game created by the indie developer Digital Eel and released for Windows and Mac on March 15, 2002, by boardgame developer-publisher, Cheapass Games. Releases for Pocket PC and Palm by British developer-publisher Astraware followed. In 2020, the game was updated to run on current computer operating systems of the day. It remains free to download and share.

Strange Adventures is considered one of the first rogue-lite games, a hybrid of roguelikes and other types of games.

== Gameplay ==
In Strange Adventures In Infinite Space the game players explore a "plausibly implausible" fictional region of the Milky Way galaxy called The Purple Void.

In each play session, players embark on a 10-year mission aboard a starship, visiting various stars that trigger a variety of dynamic, pre-designed events. Events do not follow a linear sequence, while travelling between stars involves turn-based movement. Each star provides an opportunity to encounter alien species, discover valuable artifacts, recruit mercenaries, or even collect exotic lifeforms. The aliens are diverse and include inscrutable artificial intelligences, uplifted animals, and strange plant-based beings, often inspired by the works of famous science fiction authors such as Isaac Asimov, Arthur C. Clarke, and Roger Zelazny. These encounters offer players choices that can lead to peaceful interactions, trade, or combat, though conflict is always optional. Players may also face obstacles such as falling into black holes or encountering space whales, adding an unpredictable layer to each journey.

The game’s modular narrative structure ensures that every playthrough is unique, with new events, discoveries, and challenges emerging based on the stars and species players encounter. Combat is a simple real-time sequence, but can usually be avoided. As players explore, they can upgrade their ship, making each session feel like an episodic adventure in a vast, ever-changing universe. Ultimately, the goal is to return to the homeworld at the end of the mission, but how players choose to interact with the galaxy and what they bring back will shape the story they’ve experienced.

Strange Adventures In Infinite Space sets itself up differently each time it is played. Stars, black holes, planets, nebulae, artifacts, alien patrols, gadgets, lifeforms and dozens of events and encounters are randomized for each game session. Unlike conventional roguelikes, Strange Adventures In Infinite Space features graphics, music and sound, and game sessions typically last from 3 to 20 minutes, hence the game's tagline "Explore the galaxy in 20 minutes or less!"

== Development ==
=== Conception ===
Strange Adventures In Infinite Space was created by Digital Eel, a studio that included Richard Carlson, Iikka Keränen, and Bill Sears (creating under the name Phosphorous). Carlson and Keränen had met at Ion Storm in 1998, and after the studio's closure, met Sears while searching for new jobs. By 1999, Carlson and Keränen found new jobs at Looking Glass Studios, just as the trio founded Digital Eel with the goal of developing short games within a small budget. The team initially worked for six months on a 4X space game called Infinite Space, but were overwhelmed by the project's large scope and demands for multiplayer code. Their first full game became Plasmaworm, a simple arcade game released in 2001. Having learned from their first game release, they decided to base their next game around the abandoned content from Infinite Space. As they began to re-use those assets, they began to streamline the concept, abandoning some of the bigger ideas from their previous effort.

The new project became focused on making a space opera experience that could be completed in less than 20 minutes, inspired by roguelike games and short "beer-and-pretzels" board games. Leaning into randomly generated worlds, they drew inspiration from other roguelikes such as NetHack and Linley Henzell's Dungeon Crawl, as well as the random events seen in certain 4X games. They were also inspired by short, replayable board games such as Source of the Nile, Tales of the Arabian Nights and Voyage of the BSM Pandora. The game's theme and setting were inspired by the game Starflight, the work of Star Control creators Fred Ford and Paul Reiche III, and the fiction of Star Trek creator Gene Roddenbury.

=== Development ===
Strange Adventures In Infinite Space was designed as a quick, intense space opera. Players would explore the galaxy, encounter bizarre aliens, discover artifacts, and manage their starship, all while completing a journey within a time limit. The game avoided traditional role-playing elements like complex stats, instead focusing on intuition and discovery. The team decided to hide most numbers to keep players immersed in the fictional experience, and designer Iikka Keränen was keen to minimize the number of clicks required to complete any action. The game also introduced a simple trade system where items could be swapped without worrying about prices, adding to its fun, boardgame-like quality. They were able to adapt the principles of roguelike game design to a modern space game by focusing on permanent choices with no save data. At the time, roguelike games were typically fantasy games, leading the team to describe their project as a space roguelike or as a "roguelike-like".

The game's art style was established by recycling assets from their abandoned 4X space project, allowing them to quickly create the game's ships, combat, and interface. Bill Sears was given freedom to create the game's graphics, and its humor and mystery led the game's fiction to follow the artwork. According to Carlson, Sears made art that was inspired by the lowbrow surrealism seen in Juxtapoz, as well as the underground comix of the 1960s such as Zap Comix. The team also strived to create a consistent science-fiction universe, with environments, abilities, and technologies based on current scientific theories.

The gameplay of the game evolved as they worked on it, including rare events that might threaten the whole galaxy, and abilities that would "break" some of the game's normal rules. Although the game's development had no deadline, it was completed with part-time work from three people over six months, or the equivalent of two full-time months. Designer Rich Carlson credits the team's efficiency to their small size, which also allowed them to listen closely to feedback from testers. Released in 2002, Carlson hoped that the experience would prove the success of short, replayable games, comparing it to a growing trend of other short independent projects in the game industry.

== Release ==
Strange Adventures In Infinite Space was released on March 15, 2002, by boardgame developer-publisher Cheapass Games. As indie game portals did not exist at the time, the boardgame publisher provided a point of distribution, and the manufacture of several physical copies of the game on compact disc.

=== Sequels ===
Digital Eel followed Strange Adventures In Infinite Space with a self-funded sequel, working on the game for one and a half years part-time. Designer Rich Carlson described the game as "a hybrid, part strategy game, part adventure game and part starship combat game, similar in some ways to games like Pirates! and Star Control II". Their goal for the game's development was to add features that had previously been left out of their previous game, and to improve the game's depth and graphical quality. Weird Worlds: Return to Infinite Space was released for the PC and iPad in 2005.

By 2013, Infinite Space III: Sea of Stars was developed using crowdfunding. The game featured new species that the team had imagined while making the previous games, such as the Calatians. Infinite Space III was released in 2015. The success of the games also led to multiple board game spinoffs set in the same universe, including Eat Electric Death, and Infinite Space Explorers.

=== Re-releases ===
On November 11, 2005, the source code became freely available under the GNU GPL, though without the other game content. Since September 2009, Strange Adventures In Infinite Space was made available as freeware, including the game content. It was also released for Pocket PC and Palm by British developer and publisher, Astraware.

In 2020, Strange Adventures in Infinite Space was reissued by Digital Eel and Chris Collins with support for contemporary Windows, macOS, and Linux operating systems. Digital Eel opted to make the release for free, and included community mods that were developed to expand the game on its original release.

== Reception ==
=== Strange Adventures In Infinite Space ===
Strange Adventures in Infinite Space received a 77 score on Metacritic, indicating "generally favorable reviews". Upon release, PC Gamer highlighted the game in a special feature about indie games, describing it as "the shortest space exploration game ever" with praise for its replayability. Writing for GameSpot, Bruce Geryk felt that "the game's short length is what makes it so engaging". Tom Chick of GameSpy called it "a clever and engaging take on strategy and adventure gaming", while noting that players will see most of the game's content after a dozen play-throughs. Scot Krol of PC Game World recommended the game for providing "more enjoyment in fifteen minutes than most games have in fifteen hours of play [and] a perfect example of what good gameplay means in a game". Computer Games Magazine praised it as a "light but oddly entertaining gaming hors d'oeuvre".

The game has been noted by game designers such as Ernest Adams, who described it as "the perfect short game" while praising its variety and clever writing. Adams later noted Strange Adventures as an example of retro 2D top down gameplay, as well as having a sense of humor that sidesteps the need for a coherent science fiction world. Chris Bateman compared its randomized narrative mechanics to card-based events seen in board games, offering an efficient way to portray a variety of story events.

Strange Adventures In Infinite Space was a 2003 Independent Games Festival finalist for the Seumas McNally Grand Prize. Upon the game's free re-release, Kotaku praised it as "an excellent mix of Master Of Orion-lite strategy and Star Control-inspired arcade combat".

=== Weird Worlds: Return to Infinite Space ===
The sequel, Weird Worlds: Return to Infinite Space, has received a 79 score on Metacritic, indicating "generally favorable reviews". Finnish gaming publication Pelit felt that the game captured the feeling of space exploration, but was in need of more content. GameZilla called it "a worthy sequel to the original excellent title", and recommended the game "for those who miss the simplicity, yet complex nature of the old Star Control titles". Tyler Sager of Gaming Nexus praised the game for its short experience of exploration. Computer Games Magazine was critical of the game's randomness and lack of adventure, calling it a "CliffsNotes version of Star Control". Kieron Gillen from Eurogamer praised the game for its "variety, excitement, thought and pace all in tiny bundle you can wolf down in a sandwich break". Writing for Gamasutra, Ernest Adams praised the game for the balance between its different layers. Neal Roger Tringham felt that Weird Worlds was "much expanded and refined" compared to Strange Adventures, praising for adding more unique elements and richer detail. GameAxis noted its lower production value as an indie game, while praising the visuals and player choices in its combat scenes.

Weird Worlds won the award for Innovation In Audio at the 2006 Independent Games Festival, and was nominated for the Seumas McNally Grand Prize that same year.

== Legacy ==
Strange Adventures in Infinite Space has been considered to be one of the first "rogue-lite" games, games that took core roguelike such as permadeath and procedural generation but adopted them to different gameplay styles that forwent the tile-based and hack-and-slash gameplay. The game was highlighted in 250 Indie Games You Must Play, with Mike Rose celebrating its randomized content, short length, and replay value. Describing it as a "magical mystery tour of the universe", astrophysicist Neal Roger Tringham noted the game as one of the first science fiction themed indy games. Bounthavy Sivilay noted Strange Adventures as one of the first indie games to use procedural generation outside of the role-playing genre, inspiring later indie titles such as FTL. Writing for PC Gamer, Jody McGregor called Strange Adventures the "original spaceship roguelike", tracing its lineage from the Star Control series to FTL: Faster than Light. Co-founder of Subset Games Jay Ma acknowledged that Weird Worlds was an influence on the development of FTL, with journalists making favorable comparisons between FTL and Weird Worlds. Rock Paper Shotgun also noted the influence of Weird Worlds on The Long Journey Home, another procedurally generated space game influenced by FTL. In Exploring Roguelike Games, John Harris refers to "some of the best quasi-roguelike space games out there" when listing Strange Adventures in Infinite Space, Weird Worlds: Return to Infinite Space, and Sea of Stars: Infinite Space III.

== Reviews ==
- Pyramid

== See also ==
- List of roguelikes
- Weird Worlds: Return to Infinite Space (sequel)
