= Ragnarok (video game) =

Free-to-play roguelike video game

- Developers: Thomas Boyd and Rob Vawter (Norsehelm Productions)
- Platform: MS-DOS
- Release: 1992
- Genre: Roguelike

Ragnarok (released in Europe as Valhalla) is a freeware Roguelike video game for MS-DOS, developed by Norsehelm Productions (Thomas F. Boyd and Rob Vawter) from 1992 to 1995.

== Plot ==
Ragnarok is based on Norse mythology, with many of the gods, realms, items, and quests drawing directly from it, such as:

- Thor, god of thunder
- Jormundgand, god, the world serpent
- Loki, god, mischievous troublemaker
- Balder, fair god murdered by Loki
- Hela, god, queen of Niflheim
- Mjölnir, Thor's hammer
- Gungnir, Odin's spear
- Mimming, Freyr's sword
- Gall, Heimdall's Horn
- Skidbladnir, a boat belonging to the gods
- Ravens, benevolent monsters, messengers of Odin
- Nidhogg, monster, a dragon-like being who chews on the roots of Yggdrasil
- Dwarves, monsters, mythological smiths
- Giants, monsters, Ymir's kin
- Midgard, location, realm of men
- Niflheim, location, realm of the dead

== Gameplay ==
Ragnarok has multiple features uncommon amongst roguelike games, such as a graphical interface, a historical or mythological setting, set quests, the ability to change classes, and the ability to permanently change one's race via polymorphing.

=== Character development ===
Character development is one of the main focuses of Ragnarok. Throughout the game, the player may change forms, to obtain the powers and abilities of almost any monster in the game, except for god and demigod-level creatures. The player can also modify their own body, changing the number of fingers and eyes, and the gender of the character. The player also has the option of changing their class every ten levels, which allows you to gain power, skills, abilities, and permanent status effects.

Forms of character development in-game include:

- Scroll of Knowledge – grants the player one active ability.
- Eating a dead body – there are many creatures in the game that when killed and eaten, give you a variety of different passive abilities, and in a few rare cases cause transformation.
- Wand of Polymorph – casts a random transformation, meaning the player can become any creature in the game, including weak monsters such as rats, who cannot carry a proper inventory or wield weaponry.
- Potion of Transformation – similar to the Wand of Polymorph, but made with the use of the Alchemy skill.
- Lycanthropy, passed on by werewolf attacks.

=== Class system ===
At the beginning of the game, the player must choose from one of six character classes, all of which have varying intrinsic statistics. At level ten, the player "masters" a class, and gains all the skills that the class can use. The player can then choose a new class, or continue as the old class for another ten levels. Classes include:

- Viking – a physically strong character who gains the weapon master ability. Weapon mastery allows the player to do maximum damage with all weapons, and gives the player a free second turn from time to time.
- Blacksmith – a physically powerful character who gains the ability to work metals into weapons and armor. The blacksmith is able to forge The Runesword, a powerful, one-of-a-kind weapon.
- Woodsman – a moderately powerful character, who learns to make arrows from trees, tame lesser (beast) monsters, to swim, and to terraform the terrain.
- Conjurer – a physically weak character who learns to cast spells. In addition to using spells like the touch of death, the conjurer is able to teleport, and funnel charges from one wand to another.
- Alchemist – a physically weak character who learns to mix potions. A master alchemist is able to make the Potion of Second Life, which as the name suggests, brings the player back to life as soon as he is killed.
- Sage – a physically weak character who learns to write scrolls. A master sage can write a powerful, one-of-a-kind Switch Bodies scroll.

After the player has mastered every class, their class matters much less.

=== Ghosts ===
One element of Ragnarok gameplay is that slain player characters leave behind 'ghost data' for the next adventurer to encounter. This data includes the slain adventurer's inventory (minus a few rare items) and the map state as it was at the time of death, including all opponents. From time to time such ghosts present a play challenge, such as might be the case in 'choke point' maps where a player cannot advance due to the large number of ghosts in the area.

=== Quests ===
The game consists of six quests based on Norse mythology. They are:

1. Free Balder's soul.
2. Locate and return Mjölnir to Thor.
3. Locate and return Gjallarhorn to Heimdall.
4. Locate and return Mimming to Freyr.
5. Locate and return Gungnir to Odin.
6. Find a manner for Tyr to fight with one hand.

== Reception ==
Computer Games Strategy Plus recommended Ragnarok to role-playing game fans, calling it "lovingly crafted" and "designed to reward deep immersion in the mythology of the gameworld presented." The review felt that Ragnarok may become "a genre-defining game" on a par with Dungeon Master, with a design "serious enough to be competitive with the more sophisticated kinds of play previously only possible in paper form." The review noted that the game was unique in its "systemic" and "virtually complete" reliance on Norse mythology, and compared the gameplay to Rogue in its elegant simplicity and addictiveness. The review praised the game's "minimalist yet appropriate" graphics and sound.

Computer Gaming World called Ragnarok "an exploration and item management exercise of the most mind-swamping sort" with a primitive interface and repetitive, number intensive gameplay, recommending it as "a diversion for only the most stalwart and easily amused adventurer."

PCGames called Ragnarok "an unforgiving, sadistic game that's almost impossible to navigate" with gameplay descended from Dungeons & Dragons and games like Hack. The reviewer felt most gamers would be turned off by the dated graphics and "lack of plot, puzzles, music," and "non-player character interactions" but recommended the game to "more-conservative D&D types" who would relish the game's difficulty and "well-developed gaming system."

Computer Game Review rated Ragnarok 80% overall. The three individual reviewers called it an unsophisticated but enjoyable game; an easy-to play game that didn't hold interest due to a lack of variety; and a lot of fun due to being "complex without being complicated."

Game Players PC Entertainment called Ragnarok an instantly playable game that plays quickly and easily despite its size and provides a rich gameplay experience "despite its unsophisticated appearance".

In a 2007 retrospective, The Escapist called Ragnarok "the most brutally unforgiving" depiction of Norse mythology in computer games.
