= Quest of Dungeons =

2014 video game

- Developer: Upfall Studios
- Publishers: WW: Upfall Studios; JP: Flyhigh Works (NS)
- Programmer: David Amador
- Artist: Oryx
- Platforms: Windows, OS X, Linux, Xbox One, PlayStation 4, Nintendo 3DS, Wii U, Nintendo Switch, iOS, Android
- Release: March 25, 2014: Windows, OS X, iOS March 25, 2014 Linux May 31, 2014 Android August 26, 2014 Xbox One September 7, 2015 Nintendo 3DS September 29, 2016 Wii U September 29, 2016 PlayStation 4 January 17, 2017 Nintendo Switch August 10, 2017
- Genre: Roguelike
- Mode: Single-player

Quest of Dungeons is a roguelike video game released on March 25, 2014 by Portuguese developer Upfall Studios. The game has graphics resembling 16-bit game consoles. It was initially released for Windows, Mac, and iOS, then for Xbox One via ID@Xbox on September 7, 2015. In February 2016, it was announced that the game was being developed for Wii U and Nintendo 3DS and was released on September 29, 2016. It was later released for PlayStation 4 on January 17, 2017. On August 2, 2017, it was announced that it would be coming to the Nintendo Switch.

== Gameplay ==
The player can assume the role of one of four different character class types, the Warrior, Wizard, Assassin or Shaman. The player enters a Mansion on the top floor and gradually progress down the increasing difficulty floors by leveling up. The entire game is randomly generated, so monsters, traps, loot are never on the same place. The game world is placed in a tile-based square grid that is viewed from a top-down perspective, where the player, enemies, items and objects occupy discrete squares. The game is turn-based, and both the player and numerous enemies take turns performing actions. The game has a very fast approach to the turn-based mechanic, and while the player does have to wait for the enemies to take turn, everything is done very quickly to keep the action fluid. Each turn the player may move or attack monsters in adjacent squares, pick, drop, and use items, and interact with various in-game objects. Permanent death is a major part of the game, in which if the player dies by losing all HP it will restart from the beginning of the game, thus creating a different dungeon, there are no options inside the game to change this, so while the player can save and continue later at any moment, if he dies he can't continue.

== Plot ==
The game doesn't take itself very seriously and makes fun of the traditional plots. In this case, an Evil Dark Lord steals all the light in the world and traps it inside a magical lantern. The four heroes decide that it would be a good idea if one of them enters alone. This is a nod to B movie plots where sometimes characters make the most illogical decision.

== Development ==
According to the developer, development of the game started in June 2013. Initially planned as a tablet only game, it was ported to PC before initial release, after being approved via Steam Greenlight it was released on March 25, 2014. In the following months it was ported to Linux, Android and eventually Xbox One. The game was developed using a in-house Game Engine.

== Reception ==
Reception

Aggregate score
Aggregator	Score
Metacritic	(iOS) 66/100 (XONE) 76/100 (NS) 74/100

Review scores
Publication	Score
Nintendo Life	(WIIU) 8/10
TouchArcade	(iOS) 4/5

Critics have generally give the game good scores, especially the Xbox One version, considered the most polished and easy to pick version. While the desktop version was well received among players, it had mixed to positive reviews from critics, mostly because of the poorly devised Keyboard/Mouse controls that it had at launch.

TouchArcade gave it a 4/5 saying that "Quest of Dungeons is a very good roguelike and a fun game.". Softpedia gave it a 7/10 complementing on the solid gameplay, replayability and difficulty balance, but criticizing the lack of variety in the game. Pocket Gamer gave it a 6/10, and Nintendo Life gave the Wii U version a 8/10.

== See also ==
- List of roguelikes
