= Slash'EM =

Variant of the NetHack video game

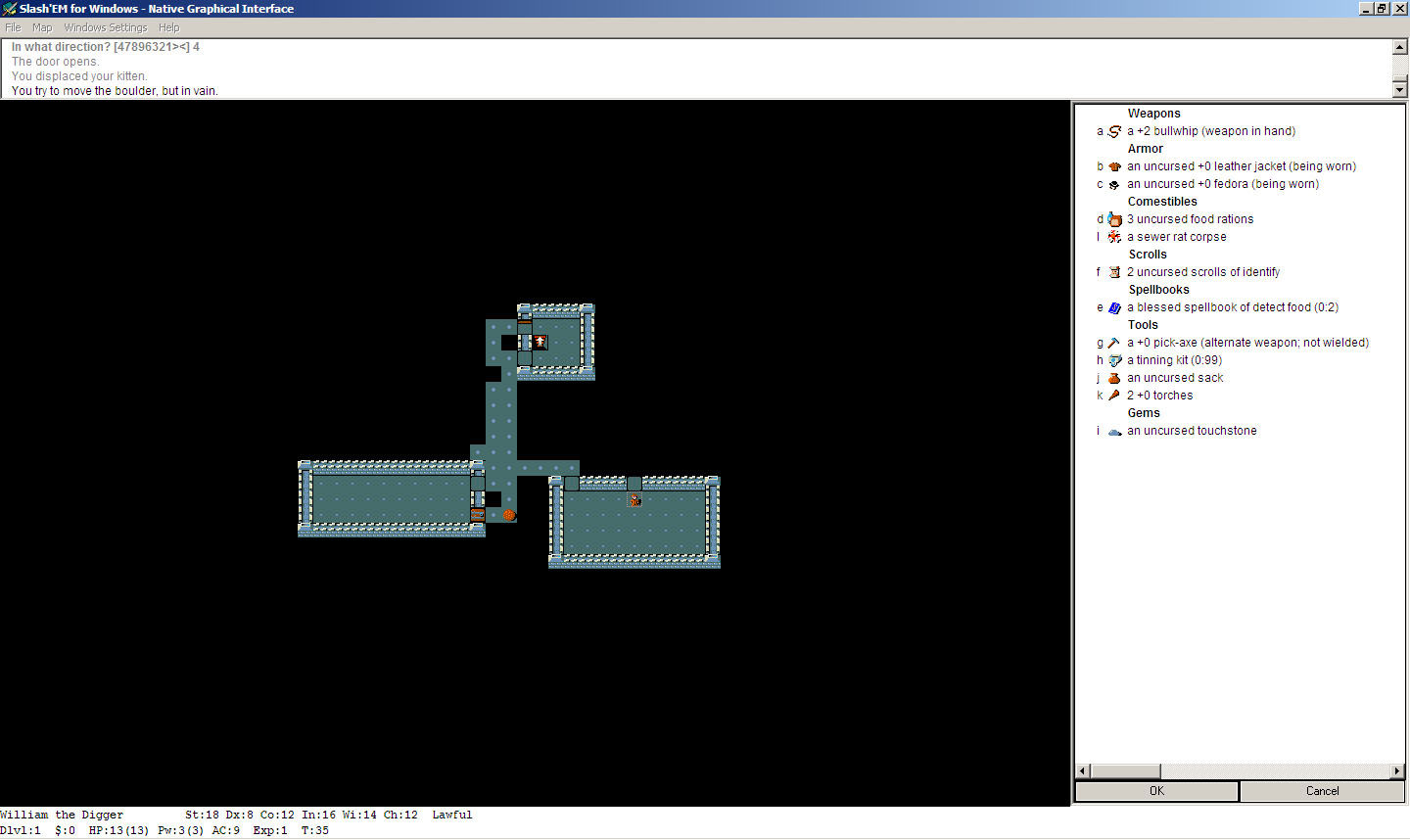
- Slash'EM screenshot
- Developer: The Slash'EM development team
- Stable release: 0.0.7E7F3 / December 30, 2006
- Operating system: Cross-platform
- Type: Roguelike
- License: MIT License; NetHack General Public License
- Website: www.slashem.org
- Repository: https://github.com/k21971/SlashEM

Slash'EM (Super Lotsa Added Stuff Hack – Extended Magic) is a variantof the roguelike game NetHack that offers extra features, monsters, and items. Several of its novel features, such as the Monk class, "conducts" (voluntary challenges), and the Sokoban levels, have been reincorporated into NetHack.

The main dungeon in Slash'EM is much larger than in NetHack, introducing special levels such as the Sunless Sea, where a magic lamp lies, and the Guild of Disgruntled Adventurers, populated by "player monsters" (archaeologists, barbarians, and other playable Slash'EM classes).

Compared to NetHack, Gehennom comprises fewer levels, though it contains a special level for each demon lord and prince, including those who only appear when summoned in NetHack. These alterations serve to reduce player tedium that results from trekking through repetitive maze levels.

== Development ==
Warren Cheung began Slash'EM development in 1997, basing it on a NetHack variant, Slash.

== Compatible graphical interfaces ==
Enhanced graphical options also exist, such as the isometric perspective of Vulture, or the three-dimensional rendering that noegnud offers. Vulture (previously Vulture's Claw) is a fork of the now-defunct Falcon's Eye project. Vulture adds additional graphics, sounds, bugfixes and performance enhancements and is under active development.
