= Andries Brouwer =

Dutch mathematician and computer programmer (born 1951)

- Born: 1951 (age 74–75)
- Citizenship: Netherlands
- Education: Vrije Universiteit
- Known for: Brouwer's conjecture Brouwer–Haemers graph Hack
- Scientific career
- Fields: Mathematician
- Workplaces: CWI, TU/e
- Doctoral advisor: Maarten Maurice, Pieter Baayen

Andries Evert Brouwer (born 1951) is a Dutch mathematician and computer programmer, Professor Emeritus at Eindhoven University of Technology (TU/e). He is known as the creator of the greatly expanded 1984 to 1985 versions of the roguelike computer game Hack that formed the basis for NetHack. He is also a Linux kernel hacker. He is sometimes referred to by the handle aeb.

== Biography ==
Born in Amsterdam, Brouwer attended the gymnasium, and obtained his MSc in mathematics at the University of Amsterdam in 1971. In 1976 he received his Ph.D. in mathematics from Vrije Universiteit with a thesis entitled "Treelike Spaces and Related Topological Spaces", under the supervision of Maarten Maurice and Pieter Baayen, both of whom were in turn students of Johannes de Groot. In 2004 he received an honorary doctorate from Aalborg University.

After graduation Brouwer started his academic career at the Mathematisch Centrum, later Centrum Wiskunde & Informatica. From 1986 to 2012 he was Professor at Eindhoven University of Technology (TU/e).

== Work ==
Brouwer's varied research interests include several branches of discrete mathematics, particularly graph theory, finite geometry and coding theory.

He has published dozens of papers in graph theory and other areas of combinatorics, many of them in collaboration with other researchers. His co-authors include at least 9 of the co-authors of Paul Erdős, giving him an Erdős number of 2.

=== Hack ===
In December 1984, while at the Centrum Wiskunde & Informatica (CWI), he made the first public release of Hack on Usenet. Hack was an implementation of Rogue originally written in 1982 by Jay Fenlason and a few others, but Brouwer heavily modified and expanded it. He distributed a total of four versions of Hack between December 1984 and July 1985.

The source code was released as free software, and it was widely copied, played, and ported to multiple computer platforms. When Mike Stephenson brought together a large development team via Usenet to produce an enhanced version in 1987 incorporating changes from many of the Hack derivatives, they respected Brouwer's wishes by renaming their game NetHack, as Brouwer might "...eventually release a new version of his own."

=== Linux kernel ===
Brouwer has also been involved with the development of Unix-like computer operating systems based on the Linux kernel. He was previously the maintainer of the man pager program man and the maintainer of the Linux man-pages project (from 1995 to 2004), and he is a kernel maintainer in the areas of disk geometry and partition handling.

Brouwer also serves as specialist in security aspects of Unix and Linux for EiPSI (Eindhoven Institute for the Protection of Systems and Information), TU/e's information security research institute.

== Selected publications ==
- Brouwer, Andries; Arjeh Cohen; Arnold Neumaier (August 1989). Distance Regular Graphs. Ergebnisse der Mathematik und ihrer Grenzgebiete 3.19. Springer-Verlag. ISBN 0-387-50619-5.
- Brouwer, Andries; Haemers, Willem (16 December 2011). Spectra of Graphs. Springer. ISBN 978-1-4614-1938-9.
