= Izchak Miller =

- Born: September 1935; Jerusalem, Israel
- Died: April 1, 1994 (aged 58); New York City, NY, US
- Occupation: Philosopher

Izchak Miller (September, 1935 – April 1, 1994) was a philosopher and author, known, among other things, for his scholarly writings on Edmund Husserl and his contributions to Husserlian phenomenology.

Miller was a coordinator of the Cognitive Science Research Group at the University of Pennsylvania from 1985 to 1986, and was an assistant professor in the Philosophy department from 1982 to 1988. He later joined the faculty of Yeshiva University in 1993, and also taught at Stanford University, UCLA, Brandeis University, and the MIT, where he held his first professorship from 1973 to 1977. In addition, he was employed at the Xerox Palo Alto Research Center (PARC) for a period of time.

Miller received both his baccalaureate and doctoral degrees in philosophy from the University of California, Los Angeles. He belonged to a school of phenomenology called West Coast Phenomenology, along with contemporaries Dagfinn Føllesdal, Ronald McIntyre and David Woodruff Smith.

Miller died of cancer in New York City on April 1, 1994, at the age of 58.

== NetHack ==
In addition to his academic career, Miller was also one of the core developers of the NetHack computer game from 1986 up to his death; version 3.2 of NetHack, the first to come out after his death, was dedicated to his memory. He appears in the game as the owner of a lighting store.

== Notable works ==
- Miller, Izchak: Husserl's Account of our Temporal Awareness, Husserl, Intentionality and Cognitive Science, Hubert Dreyfus (ed.). Cambridge, Massachusetts: MIT Press, 1982, pp. 125–146
- Miller, Izchak: Husserl, perception, and temporal awareness. Cambridge, Massachusetts: MIT Press, January 1984; OCLC 9784006, LCCN 83-43023, ISBN 978-0-262-13189-6
- Miller, Izchak: Perceptual Reference, Synthese, Vol. 61, No. 1, The Intentionality of Mind, Part I, October 1984, pp. 35–59
- Miller, Izchak: Husserl on the Ego, Topoi Volume 5, Issue 2, September 1986, pp. 157–162
- Miller, Izchak: Husserl and Sartre on the Self, The Monist Vol. 69, No. 4, Intentionality, October, 1986, pp. 534–545
