= Runestone Keeper =

2015 video game

- Steam banner
- Developers: Blackfire Games, Cimu
- Publisher: Blackfire Games
- Engine: Unity
- Platforms: Windows, Mac OS X, iOS, Android, Nintendo Switch, Xbox One, PlayStation 4
- Release: March 23, 2015
- Genre: Roguelike
- Mode: Single-player

Runestone Keeper is a roguelike video game developed and published by Blackfire Games, with the iOS version developed by Cimu. It was released on March 23, 2015 for Windows and Mac OS X, October 31, 2015 for iOS, and August 11, 2017 for Android.

== Gameplay ==
Each level is played on a tiled grid with fog of war, dark tiles are revealed by tapping them

The game is a roguelike that has been compared to Dungelot for the fact that the player explores levels by tapping on dark tiles to reveal them, but also adds "extensive RPG elements". The player can choose from six different classes and explores the level for keys as well as items. Each level has 56 tiles and the player can only move to the next level down by finding the stairs.

To attack enemies, the player taps on the tile they are on, but each monster also has unique skills, like deflecting or absorbing damage. Enemies will usually counterattack only when attacked, unless they are ranged, while other enemies gradually get stronger if they are left alone. Wiping out all monsters on the floor gives the player an additional bonus.

The player's own stats can be buffed by equipment, and items can give the player temporary advantages. Using items costs "Soul" points, making them only able to be used at specific times. The player can also sacrifice various things at altars to pledge themselves to a god and obtain a stat boost.

When the player dies, they will bring back all of their money to their home base, allowing them to upgrade the base, buy characters or increase the power of abilities.

== Plot ==
The game takes place in a town above a mysterious dungeon known as the Runestone Dungeon that is said to contain great power. Many different warriors come to descend into the depths of the dungeon, but they are all trapped forever within it. Each time the player defeats the final boss, the game's universe "resets", unbeknownst to the player character, although other NPCs are aware of this. Each run of the game ends with the final stanza of The Hollow Men.

== Development ==
Runestone Keeper was included in Humble Jumbo Bundle 7 in 2016. Runestone Keeper was released for Xbox One and Windows 10 on the Microsoft Store in 2018 by E-Home Entertainment. Runestone Keeper was released on the Nintendo Switch eShop on August 20, 2020.

In July 2020, Runestone Keeper was delisted from the Apple app store in China alongside two thousand other titles, due to lacking a license and not having been reviewed by the Chinese government.

== Reception ==
Alexandru Chirila of Softpedia scored the game's demo 4/5 stars, calling it "a wonderful little dungeon crawler" and "a well-polished game even though it's still in the works". Carter Dodson of TouchArcade called the game "a solid game to check out" and said that he "had fun with it". 4Gamer.net also recommended the game to players who were interested in roguelikes.
