= Mark Sheeky =

British Artist

- Born: 1972 (age 53–54)
- Website: www.marksheeky.com

Mark Sheeky (born 1972) is a Cheshire-based British artist, computer game developer, music artist, and author.

From childhood Sheeky designed and developed computer games, and began painting in 2004.

In 2010, he donated the 2008 painting "Two Roman Legionaries Discovering The God-King Albion Turned Into Stone" to the Grosvenor Museum collection, and won First Prize in the Grosvenor Art competition in 2012 for his work "The Paranoid Schizophrenia of Richard Dadd".

== Radio ==
- ArtsLab (2016–2018)

== Books ==
=== As author ===
- Sheeky, Mark (2012). 365 Universes. Pentangel Books. ISBN 978-0-9571947-1-7.
- Sheeky, Mark (2015). The Many Beautiful Worlds of Death. Pentangel Books. ISBN 978-0-9571947-3-1.
- Sheeky, Mark (2018). 21st Century Surrealism. Pentangel Books. ISBN 978-0-9571947-6-2.
- Sheeky, Mark (2018). Deep Dark Light. Pentangel Books. ISBN 978-0-9571947-4-8.

=== As illustrator ===
- Blake, William (2014). Songs of Life. Pentangel Books. ISBN 978-0-9571947-2-4.
- Edgeley, Deborah (2017). Testing the Delicates. Ink Pantry Publishing. ISBN 978-1-5472372-5-8.
- Blake, William (2018). Songs of Innocence and of Experience. Pentangel Books. ISBN 978-0-9571947-5-5.

=== As contributing author or illustrator ===
- Various Authors (2014). Hide It!. Mardibooks. ISBN 978-1-909227-66-8.
- Various Authors (2015). The Ball of the Future. Earlyworks Press. ISBN 978-1-910841-25-9.
- Various Authors (2015). Journeys Beyond. Earlyworks Press. ISBN 978-1-910841-37-2.
- Kingsley, Nadia (2018). Diversifly. Fair Acre Press. ISBN 978-1-911048-26-8.

== Discography ==
=== Singles ===
- 2018: House Of Glass, Cornutopia Music
- 2018: Masculinity Two, Cornutopia Music
- 2024: Gunstorm (collaboration with Tor James Faulkner), Cornutopia Music

=== EP ===
- 2017: Finnegans Judgement, Cornutopia Music
- 2018: A Walk In The Countryside, Cornutopia Music
- 2024: Gunstorm (collaboration with Tor James Faulkner), Cornutopia Music

=== Albums ===
- The Arcangel Soundtrack (2000), Cornutopia Music
- Synaesthesia (2002), REV Records
- The Incredible Journey (2002), Cornutopia Music
- The Spiral Staircase (Original) (2004), Cornutopia Music
- Animalia (2004), Pravda
- Flatspace (The Official Soundtrack) (2007), Cornutopia Music
- The Spiral Staircase (2008), Cornutopia Music
- The End And The Beginning (collaboration with Tor James Faulkner) (2009), Cornutopia Music
- The Twelve Seasons (2009), Cornutopia Music
- The Infinite Forest (2010), Cornutopia Music
- Once Upon A Time (2010), Cornutopia Music
- Pi (2010), Cornutopia Music
- Flatspace II (The Official Soundtrack) (2012), Cornutopia Music
- The Love Symphony (2012), Cornutopia Music
- Bites of Greatness (2013), Cornutopia Music
- Synaesthesia (2015), Cornutopia Music
- The Anatomy of Emotions (2016), Cornutopia Music
- Cycles & Shadows (2017), Cornutopia Music
- Genesis (2017), Cornutopia Music
- Tree Of Keys (2019), Cornutopia Music
- Music Of Poetic Objects (2019), Cornutopia Music

== Video games ==
- Flatspace (2003), together with Andrew Williams, Cornutopia Software, released for Microsoft Windows. The player assumes the role of a spaceship captain. The game use 3D graphics with a top-down view and combines features from space trading simulators and action role-playing games. Play is open-ended: activities available include trading, missions, exploration, bounty hunting, space piracy, and police work. Game Tunnel rated Flatspace 9.5 out of 10, and were impressed with the tracking of every individual ship, found the battle with different scale ships to be "exhilarating" and the varied, open-ended gameplay to be enjoyable.
- Flatspace II: The Rise of the Scarrid (2005).
- Flatspace IIk: The Scarrid Dominion (2012).
