= Cogmind =

2017 roguelike video game

- Developer: Grid Sage Games
- Publisher: Grid Sage Games
- Release: 16 October 2017 (Early access)
- Genres: Role-playing, roguelike
- Mode: Single-player

Cogmind is a science fiction tactical roguelike video game developed and published by Grid Sage Games for Microsoft Windows. It entered Steam Early Access on 16 October 2017, following a period of public alpha and beta testing. The player controls a customisable robot that scavenges parts from other machines to enhance its capabilities while navigating a procedural world inhabited by autonomous robotic factions.

== Gameplay ==
The player character is a robot, which is able to salvage parts from the remains of other robots; the game includes over 1000 of these parts. Character development is primarily focused around equipment: parts can be gained and used to become more powerful, but can also be destroyed by taking damage. Another distinguishing feature is the in-game interface, which is considered to be user-friendly compared to other roguelikes. The game also features a destructible environment, "a living ecosystem" of robot types, and a detailed stealth system that minimises dependence on combat.

== Development ==
Cogmind originated as an entry for the 2012 7-Day Roguelike Challenge, and was based on Josh Ge's previous roguelike X@COM. After the challenge, Ge decided to develop the concept further, releasing the first public alpha on 24 May 2015, though Ge considered the alpha to be on the level of many games' release candidates. In the beginning of 2016, it was selected as one of Destructoid's top indie games to look for that year. Grid Sage Games released a public beta on 6 May 2017. This was followed by an early access release on Steam on 16 October 2017. Despite it being labelled as early access, Ge stated that it was "a very complete experience", and that he only planned to withhold it from full release for around 6 months. However, as of 2026 the game remains in early access; Ge has since clarified that its core content was effectively complete by 2017, and that the label is retained specifically to allow continued free expansion of the game with new content — additional maps, factions and endings — rather than to signal an unfinished product.

== Reception ==
Cogmind has been noted for its depth, distinctive interface and rich procedural systems, receiving positive reviews from players and coverage from independent gaming press. It has also appeared in lists of notable indie and roguelike titles during its development. PC Gamer later described it as having grown into a title with a far higher profile than its initial niche reception suggested, citing continued major content expansions years into its Early Access period.
