= Steve Moraff =

American video game designer (born 1963)

Steven Richard Moraff (born 1963) is a video game designer and programmer best known for a series of MS-DOS shareware games launched in the late 1980s and early 1990s. The games were sold under the name Moraffware (sometimes written as MoraffWare) and usually included his surname in the title, such as Moraff's Revenge, Moraff's World, and Moraff's Stones.

== Early life ==
Raised in Ithaca, New York, Steve Moraff's father was an IBM employee who worked on Cornell's mainframe and his mother was a child development expert. Moraff began programming in a free computer lab provided by a local non-profit, trying to start a science museum in Ithaca. He briefly attended the Alternative Community School but later dropped out of school and, after taking some courses at the local community college, he obtained his GED.

== Game development ==
In the late 1980s, Moraff began programming games for MS-DOS, culminating in the 1988 release of Moraff's Revenge, a dungeon crawler distributed using a shareware model. This launched the company that became Moraffware and later Software Diversions, Inc. (SDI), based in Florida, which specializes in mahjong solitaire-type games. Moraff's Revenge was followed by Moraff's World and Moraff’s Dungeons of the Unforgiven in 1991 and 1993 respectively.

Moraff's games were notable for pushing the limits of the hardware. Moraffware published some of the first games that supported 24-bit color SVGA output, displaying 16.7 million colors and supporting resolutions up to 1024x768.

== Works ==
Year	Game	Notes
1988	Moraff's Revenge	
1989	Moraff's Pinball	
1991	Superblast	
1991	Moraff's World	
1991	Moraff's Flygame	
1991	Moraff's Excapade	
1991	Moraff's Entrap	
1991	Mather	
1992	Moraff's Stones	
1992	Moraff's Morejongg	
1992	Moraff's Monster Memory	
1992	Moraff's Monster Bridge	
1993	Moraff’s Dungeons of the Unforgiven	
