= Cave Noire =

1991 roguelike video game

- Developer: Konami
- Publisher: Konami
- Designer: Kazuo Iwasaki
- Programmers: Kazuo Iwasaki; Tamotsu Goto
- Artist: Kazutomo Terada
- Composers: Shinji Tasaka; Yoshiyuki Hagiwara
- Platform: Game Boy
- Release: JP: April 19, 1991
- Genres: Roguelike, role-playing
- Mode: Single-player

Cave Noire (カーブノア) is a Japanese roguelike video game developed and published by Konami and released on April 19, 1991, for the Nintendo Game Boy. It has never been officially released in the west.

In 2012, a fan translated English patch for the game was released online.

The player takes on the role of a hero, either male or female, who has recently arrived at the village of Karuzu, which consists of an Adventurer's Guild and four distinct randomly generated dungeons. In order to be admitted to the guild, the player must challenge and conquer each dungeon multiple times, raising his or her level. Each dungeon consists of ten difficulty levels, with defeat of level six required to gain the Adventurer rank.

In the years since its release, Cave Noire has gained a reputation as a "hidden gem" on the Game Boy platform and as an example of a console based roguelike game many years ahead of its time.

== Gameplay ==
A screenshot of typical Cave Noire gameplay. The player is confronted with a randomly generated room containing a couple of monsters and a gold coin.

The game revolves around four quests: killing monsters, freeing fairies, or collecting gold/orbs, with ten difficulties each. The difficulty determines how big the target number is, the stats the player starts with, and what monsters are encountered. Starting a quest creates a randomly generated dungeon where the player has one chance to reach the goal – death means a new dungeon has to be created. Beating a difficulty level unlocks the next; this is also the one thing the game saves. As the level number progresses, the strength of the monsters the player faces also increases.

The dungeon itself is shown from a top-down perspective and features the hero, walls, floor tiles, monsters, and items to collect. Movement is turn-based and each turn is divided into four phases (player movement, player attack, monster attack, and finally monster movement). Attacks are only possible when the two participants stand in adjacent tiles; the computer simply calculates the result from the participants' statistics (attack, defence, luck, and a random component) which then lowers the health points of the attacked hero/monster. Reaching a health of zero means defeat. The mentioned statistics can be improved by finding and using certain items like weapons or armour. Potions, spells, and rings have additional effects when used/equipped, e.g. health refreshments, poison, dealing increased damage, or invisibility.

The environment also plays a part in the quest. The walls and tiles may have special effects when touched, as with pits (the player/monster falls to the next level of the dungeon and takes damage), breakable walls, lava, or teleporters. Some rooms may be covered in fog which obscures the floor tiles until the hero walks onto them (monsters eyes are still visible). There is a specific kind of monster which clears the whole room when killed – but at the same time, another one has the exact opposite effect.

After the player defeats level six of the four quests, they are given the Adventurer rank by the Adventurer's Guild, but four more post-game difficulty levels remain.

== Reception ==
=== Japanese reception ===
Reception

Review scores
Publication	Score
Famitsu	7/10, 7/10, 8/10, 7/10
Hippon Super!	7/10

In Japan, reviewers in the game magazine Famicom Tsūshin said Cave Noire's various small quests give it a good pick up and play quality. Other reviewers complimented how easy it was to play and its unique take on the role-playing game genre. Hideaki Fujimori of Hippon Super! described it as a bizarre RPG, and saying he was most impressed by how easy it was to read the status and items displays which was not always the case in Game Boy games.

The Family Computer Magazine's Game Report gave the game a rating based on reader voting of 18.9 (out of 30) with the following details:

Topic	Character	Music	Value for money	Operability	Enthusiasm level	Originality	Total
Score	3.0	3.2	3.1	3.1	3.1	3.5	18.9

=== Retrospective western reception ===
Although the game was never officially released outside Japan, it has been reviewed in the west a number of times in the years since, generally being given overwhelmingly positive reception. Honest Gamers described the game as perfectly designed for the Game Boy and said that within, "five minutes, you can have a complete, satisfying RPG adventure", awarding it a 5 star review.

Skyler Schoos also praised the game saying, "It's difficult for its time, its well designed, concise, and fun. In my opinion, this is a severely overlooked masterpiece, deserving of a much higher place in the Roguelike history books than it currently holds."

"Kimimi The Game-Eating She-Monster", in a review titled "Cave Noire: Cart-sized caving" said that, "I's a beautifully crafted and densely packed experience, every decision hanging heavy in the air even though a “long” quest will last minutes rather than hours." and that "Here you always believe that between the tools at your disposal and perhaps a little luck you have a real chance to think your way to victory, Cave Noire always finding a way to look intimidating without feeling unpalatably overwhelming."
