= Dungelot =

- Developer: Red Winter Software
- Platforms: Adobe Flash, iOS, Android
- Release: Kongregate; 8 December 2012 iOS; 10 January 2013; Android; 9 February 2013
- Genre: Roguelike
- Mode: Single-player

Dungelot is a roguelike video game with permadeath developed by Russian studio Red Winter Software. It was released in 2012 on Kongregate and in 2013 for iOS and Android. Two sequels have been released.

== Gameplay ==
In Dungelot, the player must choose a character from the character selection menu. All the characters except one are locked and must be unlocked by reaching certain levels in the game. The chosen character will give the player a certain perk which can help the player in defeating each floor. Once the player has chosen a character and is in the game they must click on the tiles to show what's underneath it. The battle system is turn-based, which means after the player attacks, the enemy will attack and vice versa. The attack the player does is based on how much attack power they have. The default across the characters is between 1 and 3. To continue to the next floor the player must kill the enemy that is holding the key. The key will then unlock the door to the next level (which must also be found). When the player dies they must restart from floor one.

== Reception ==
Reception

Aggregate score
Aggregator	Score
Metacritic	83/100

Review score
Publication	Score
TouchArcade	4/5

The iOS version of Dungelot has a rating 83/100 on Metacritic based on 8 critic reviews.

== Legacy ==
There are two sequels: Dungelot 2 and Dungelot: Shattered Lands.

Runestone Keeper is the most famous Dungelot knockoff, to the point of GOG.com accepting Runestone Keeper, but not Dungelot.
