= Hack (video game) =

1984 roguelike video game

- A game of Hack showing a Knight being hit by a Gnome
- Release: 17 January 1984; 42 years ago
- Stable release: 1.0.3 / 23 July 1985; 41 years ago
- Written in: C
- Successor: NetHack
- Available in: English
- Type: Roguelike video game
- License: 3-clause BSD license

Hack is a 1984 roguelike video game that introduced shops as gameplay elements and expanded available monsters, items, and spells. It later became the basis for NetHack.

== History and development ==
Hack was created in 1982 by Jay Fenlason with the assistance of Kenny Woodland, Mike Thome, and Jonathan Payne, while students at Lincoln-Sudbury Regional High School. A greatly extended version was first released on Usenet in 1984 by Andries Brouwer. Brouwer continued to work on Hack until July 1985. Don Kneller ported the game to MS-DOS and continued development there. Development on all Hack versions ended within a few years. Hack descendant NetHack was released in 1987.

Hack is still available for Unix, and is distributed alongside many modern Unix-like OSes, including Debian, Ubuntu, the BSDs, Fedora, and others. Hack has also been ported to a variety of non-Unix-based platforms. NetHack is available for almost all platforms which run Hack. There is one exception: Hack is available, but NetHack is unavailable, for the Game Boy Advance.

== Gameplay ==
The object of the game is to delve into a dungeon to retrieve the Amulet of Yendor, and accumulate as many points as possible before perishing. Like all descendants of Rogue, Hack is displayed from a top-down view, painted with text characters. Gameplay is turn-based, with the turn beginning with the player's action (Move, Attack, Eat, Cast spell, etc.). Commands are mapped to various letters of the keyboard, including "i" for Inventory, "e" for Eat food, etc.

=== Character ===
The player can choose from several characters that have different abilities such as Wizard or Cave(wo)man. The character finds equipment as they delve such as weapons, armor, potions, wands, rings and special items.

=== Questing ===
After choosing a character the game begins with the character and their dog in a dungeon. The character starts with no possessions, and must quickly pick up found articles in order to arm themselves against monsters.

The character confronts various monsters: hobgoblins, leprechauns, acid blobs, bats, centaurs, chameleons, dragons, ghosts, imps, and trolls, and enter special rooms such as shops, crypts, and vaults, as well as traps and swamps.

There is always an impetus to keep moving because, although there is food to be found, if the character runs out of food and cannot locate more in time, the character dies. As the character gains experience, their abilities and score increase, but so does their need for increasing amounts of food.

There is a limit to how much weight the character can carry, so the player must choose which items to keep and which to leave behind. Likewise the player must decide how much gold and gems to keep; although they increase the character's score when the character perishes, they are a burden, and might prevent the character from holding more useful items.

== Interface ==
Hack implements a graphical user interface using arrangements of ASCII or Extended ASCII glyphs to represent game elements. Some later ports of Hack, on AmigaOS for example, use graphical tiles in place of these letters and symbols.

=== Typical Hack session ===
You hear some noises in the distance.
 
  
 #
                                                                  ------
                                                                  |....|
                       -----                                    ##+....|
                       |..$+#                                     |...<|
                       +...|#                                     |....|
                       |...|###############                       ------
                       |...|#             #-----+-----
                       |..%|##            #|.........|
                  #    -----#             #|.[......%L
       -+----  ##############             #|.........|
       |....|   #                         #+@........|
       |....+####                        ##-----------
       |....|
       |....+
       ------
 
 
 
 
Level 1    Hp  15(15)   Ac 9    Str 16      Exp  1          

Key:
| @ | the player character |
| + | a door |
| $ | gold |
| % | food |
| L | monster; a leprechaun |
| [ | armor |
| # | corridor |
| < | stairway leading upwards |

== Reception ==
In Issue 28 of the Australian game magazine Queensland Wargamer, Timo Nieminen noted this game was "Similar to Rogue, which is probably better known, but Hack manages to be much better. An excellent way to waste time."
