= DRL (video game) =

2013 video game

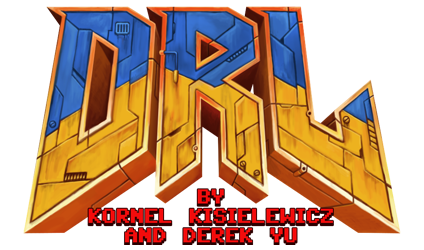
- Original authors: Kornel Kisielewicz (code), Derek Yu (art)
- Developer: ChaosForge
- Release: 2005; 21 years ago
- Stable release: v0.10 / 22 August 2025; 14 months ago
- Written in: FreePascal
- Platform: Windows, OS X, Linux
- Type: Single-player Roguelike
- License: GPL-2.0-or-later (code), CC-BY-SA-4.0 (art)
- Website: drl.chaosforge.org
- Repository: github.com/ChaosForge/drl

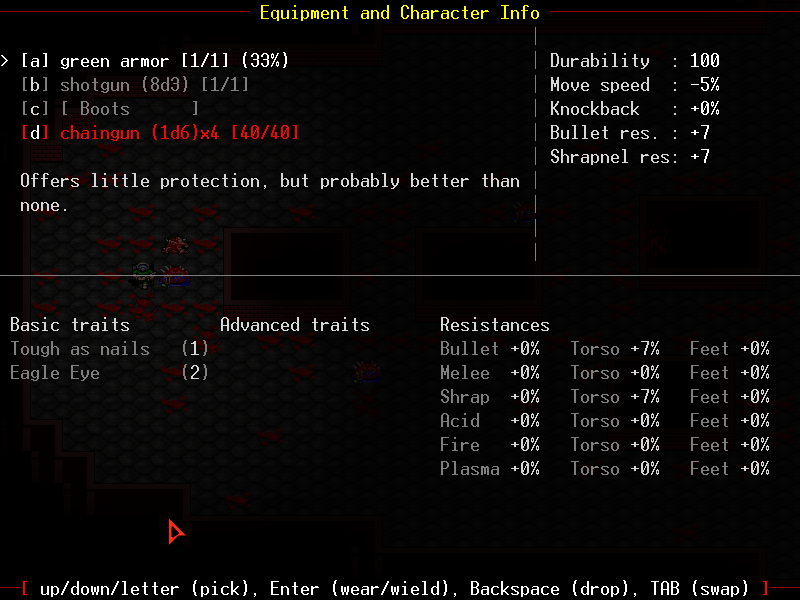
Screenshot of equipment and character info screen

DRL (formerly DoomRL), short for Doom, the Roguelike, is a roguelike video game developed by ChaosForge based on the first-person shooters Doom and Doom II. It has been in development since 2002, and was released for Microsoft Windows, Linux and OS X in 2002. Following a cease and desist notice from "Doom" trademark owner ZeniMax Media, the game's name was changed to DRL in 2016.

== Gameplay ==
DRL is turn-based, offers a top-down interface formed entirely of ASCII characters, and features a character leveling system with traits. As it is based upon Doom, the game is more fast-paced and combat-oriented than usual for a roguelike, and relies heavily on ranged rather than melee combat. A limited player inventory, non-stackable items, and other design choices contrast with the often extreme intricacy of games in its genre.

As of version 0.9.9.6, Derek Yu's graphical tileset is now the game's default, offering an alternative to the more traditional ASCII rendering. DRL includes the entire Doom soundset and music library, with optional support for high-quality MP3s.

== History ==
=== Development ===
The game was created by programmer Kornel Kisielewicz with Free Pascal, and uses art by Derek Yu. The developers based DRL in the popular first-person shooters Doom and Doom II universe. Since approximately 2002 in-development with first beta versions, the latest stable release is from 2025.

Development resumed on DRL in August 2024 by Kisielewicz with its first major release in over 11 years, paired with an announcement of Jupiter Hell Classic, a demake of DRL's spinoff game made in the DRL engine.

=== Wordmark conflict ===
On December 2, 2016, Kisielewicz received a cease and desist notice from ZeniMax Media, concerning the use of the wordmark "Doom" present on game's website and name, which ZeniMax had trademarked worldwide. To exclude "Doom" from the game's name, the title was changed to simply DRL on December 7.

=== Open sourcing DRL and Jupiter Hell Spinoffs ===
In addition, the game was made open source by Kisielewicz on December 6 the same year. Kisielewicz had planned on releasing DRL as open-source prior to receiving the notice at the conclusion of an ongoing crowdfunding campaign on Kickstarter for Jupiter Hell, a spiritual successor to DRL, as a thank-you to his supporters. The notice only made him push up this change to an earlier date. The source code was made available via GitHub under GPL 2.0 or later and the game's assets under the CC BY-SA 4.0 license. Kisielewicz anticipates that the open-source community will be able to provide support and improvements to enhance both DRL and Jupiter Hell. For instance, a community source port of DRL to the OpenPandora handheld resulted already three days later.

ChaosForge released Jupiter Hell in August 2019 under Steam's Early Access program, with a full commercial release for the game in August 2021. Jupiter Hell is a 3D isometric view roguelike game in the same style as DRL, with original art, story, and music. Jupiter Hell Classic is a demake of Jupiter Hell built on the DRL engine, was first announced in 2024 and was released on Steam early access release in August 2025.

== Reception ==
In 2014 DRL was described by PCGamer as "a brilliant mashup of two classics" and named among the "Ten top fan remade classics you can play for free right now".
