= Falcon's Eye =

Free-to-play variant of the roguelike video game NetHack

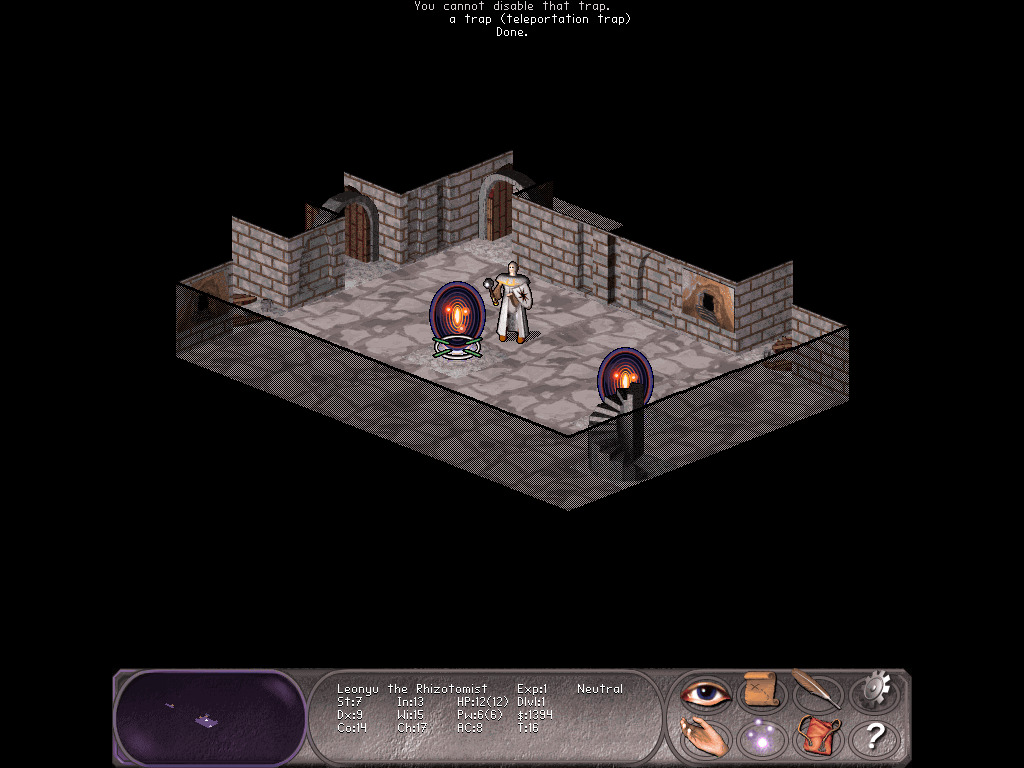
- Screenshot
- Original author: Jaakko Peltonen
- Developer: Clive Crous / community
- Release: Fall 1999 to spring 2000
- Stable release: 1.9.3 / July 3, 2001; 25 years ago
- Preview release: 2012-10-27 / October 27, 2012; 14 years ago
- Operating system: Cross-platform
- Type: Single-player, multiplayer, roguelike
- License: NetHack General Public License
- Website: falconseye.sourceforge.net

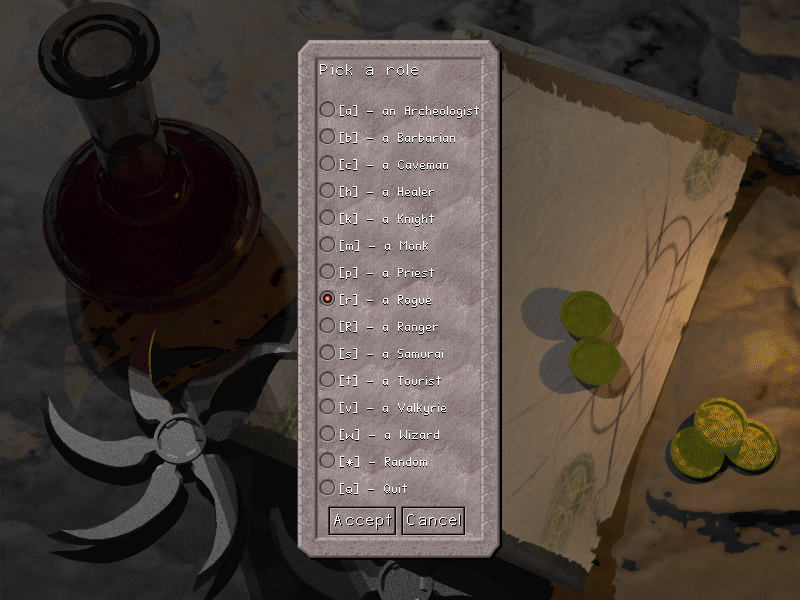
Character selection screen

Falcon's Eye is a version of the roguelike video game NetHack which introduces isometric graphics and mouse control. Falcon's Eye has been praised for improving NetHack's visuals and audio to an almost commercial level and has been noted by Linux Journal as among the best free games available. After development stalled in 2001, the game was continued as Vulture's Eye and later Vulture for Nethack.

== Gameplay ==
The main change of Falcon's Eye over earlier Nethack variants is a massive improved graphical representation: it switched from a text-based 80x25 terminal representation to a 3D isometric perspective graphical representation. The objects and enemies in the game are no longer represented by minimalistic ASCII characters, but now have actual graphical representations.

Whilst adding some features, such as a path finding tool, Falcon's Eye doesn't alter the NetHack gameplay. Peltonen says that this was to ensure that future versions remain compatible with future releases of NetHack. Falcon's Eye provides a context menu when a creature or item is right-clicked. Users can customize the interface by configuring the keyboard commands or by adding sound effects.

== History ==
=== Development ===
Falcon's Eye was developed by Jaakko Peltonen, a researcher of neural networks at Helsinki University of Technology, originally as a separate engine, and then grafted onto NetHack. The artwork and sound effects are largely his, with some submissions from users. NetHack's code assumes little about the user interface, telling which dungeon maps and messages to display, but leaves the implementation details to the interface. Peltonen explains that this versatility helped him to create Falcon's Eye, as he did not have to work around a fixed character-based interface.

Falcon's Eye is released under the NetHack General Public License.

Falcon's Eye was mostly programmed in C, with some C++ functions. Both SDL and DirectX are used for the graphics and sound in order to make the base code as system-independent as possible.

=== Development stall ===
Since the release of version 1.9.3 in 2001, development of Falcon's Eye has not progressed, with the game based on a now out-of-date version of NetHack. In the interim, at least one unofficial update has appeared in the portage package management system.

Peltonen had planned to add more customization options, allowing users to add their own graphics. As some users reported difficulty in compiling and installing Falcon's Eye, he also wished to simplify this procedure. He also envisions an application for NetHack that allows a user to switch between different user interfaces, similar to software skins.

=== Continuation: Vulture's Eye ===
The level of inactivity between 2001 and 2005 prompted Clive Crous to fork Falcon's Eye to create Vulture's Eye and Vulture's Claw, which have significant improvements on the original. The development happened on bitbucket, a switch from the previous repository SourceForge. The game was ported to several platforms, for instance the OpenPandora handheld.

Later this development branch was just called Vulture and is under continued development (as of February 2017). While still being free and open source software the game is commercialized via the author's website and Desura for $2.99. In October 2013 the game was put into the Steam Greenlight process and successfully released on Steam in February 2015.

== Reception ==
Falcon's Eye has been praised for improving NetHack's visuals and audio to an almost commercial level. In 2003 NetHack: Falcon's Eye received The Linux Game Tome's Best Free Role-Playing Game award. A 2008 review of Vulture's Eye on gamesetwatch.com called the graphics "well done". Linux Journal noted the game as among some of the best free games available in 2010.

Between 2001 and March 2018 Falcon's Eye was downloaded nearly 580,000 times from SourceForge while by March 2018 Steamspy reported over 22,000 owners of Vulture for Nethack purchased via Steam.
