= Character class =

Broad concept in tabletop and video games

In tabletop games and video games, a character class is an occupation, profession or role assigned to a game character to highlight and differentiate their capabilities and specializations.

In role-playing games (RPGs), character classes aggregate several abilities and aptitudes, and may also detail aspects of background and social standing, or impose behavior restrictions. Classes may be considered to represent archetypes, or specific careers. RPG systems that employ character classes often subdivide them into levels of accomplishment, to be attained by players during the course of the game. It is common for a character to remain in the same class for its lifetime, with restricted tech tree of upgrades and power-ups; although some games allow characters to change class or attain multiple classes, usually at the cost of game currency or special items. Some systems eschew the use of classes and levels entirely; others hybridize them with skill-based systems or emulate them with character templates.

In shooter games and other cooperative video games, classes are generally distinct roles with specific mission goals, weapons, or tactical aptitudes and special abilities, with only tangential relation to the RPG context. Their differences may range from simple equipment changes, such as sharpshooter classes armed with sniper rifles, or heavy weapon classes with machine guns and rocket launchers; to unique gameplay changes, such as medic classes that are lightly armed but tasked with healing and reviving injured allied players.

== History ==
Dungeons & Dragons (D&D), the first formalized roleplaying game, introduced the use of classes, which were inspired by the units in miniature wargames such as Chainmail. Many subsequent games adopted variations of the same idea. These games are sometimes referred to as 'class-based' systems. As well as tabletop games, character classes are found in many role-playing video games and live action role-playing games. Many of the most popular role-playing games, such as D20 system and White Wolf games still use character classes in one way or another. Most games offer additional ways to systematically differentiate characters, such as race or species, skills, or affiliations.

== In fantasy games and role-playing games ==
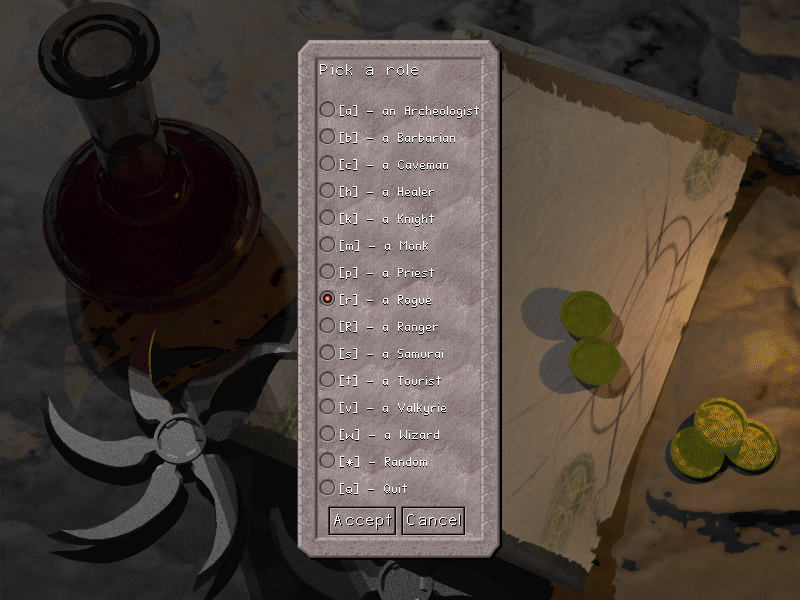
Class selection screen in Falcon's Eye

In fantasy games, Fighter, Mage, and Thief form a common archetypal trio of basic classes, each ones' abilities offsetting the other's weakness. The Fighter is strong and focuses on weapon-based combat, the Mage, renamed Wizard in later editions of Dungeons & Dragons, is a ranged fighter equipped with a variety of magical abilities for combative and utilitarian purposes, and the Thief, renamed Rogue in later editions, is not physically strong but focuses on speed or stealth. Thus, it is usual to find one or more classes that excel in combat, several classes (called spell-casters) that are able to perform magic (often different kinds of magic), and one or more classes that deal with stealth.

In its original release Dungeons & Dragons included three classes: fighting man, magic user, and Cleric, while supplemental rules added the Thief class. In subsequent editions of the game, new classes were added individually, from spell-casting classes such as the Sorcerer, Warlock and Druid, to more combat-centered classes such as the Barbarian, Ranger and Monk, along with variant subclasses.

In science fiction and other non-fantasy role-playing games, the role of magic user is often filled with a scientist or other intelligence-based class, while the Cleric becomes a medic or similarly supportive role, and the Rogue and/or Ranger with an explorer or assassin. Some science fiction and supernatural-themed RPGs also use psychic powers as a stand in for magic.

There are also character classes that combine features of the classes listed above and are frequently called hybrid classes. Some examples include the Bard (a cross between the Thief and Mage with an emphasis on interpersonal skills, mental and visual spells, and supportive magical abilities), or the Paladin (a cross between the Fighter and Cleric with slightly decreased combat skills relative to a fighter but various innate abilities that are used to heal or protect allies and repel and/or smite evil opponents).

Some RPGs feature another variation on the classes mechanic. For example, in Warhammer Fantasy Roleplay, players choose a career. The career works like a class with abilities (known in WFRP as skills and talents) added to the character based on the chosen career. However, as the player advances and gains more experience he or she may choose a new career according to a predefined career path or change to a completely different career. WFRP is also notable in that characters are encouraged to roll to determine their starting career which is compensated for by free XP which can be spent on more skills.

As an alternative to class-based systems, skill-based systems are designed to give the player a stronger sense of control over how their character develops. In such systems, players can often choose the direction of their characters as they play, usually by assigning points to certain skills. Classless games often provide templates for the player to work from, many of which are based on traditional character classes. Many classless games' settings or rules systems lend themselves to the creation of character following certain archetypal trends. For example, in the role-playing video game Fallout, common character archetypes include the "shooter", "survivalist", "scientist", "smooth talker" and "sneaker", unofficial terms representing various possible means of solving or avoiding conflicts and puzzles in the game. GURPS, which inspired Fallout's system, also used a classless system.

The original PlayStation 2 release of the role-playing video game Final Fantasy XII included a skill-based system in which as the player progressed, they would gain buffs and abilities (called licenses) via the game's License Board (of which each party member shared). Final Fantasy XII's re-release Final Fantasy XII International Zodiac Job System and high-definition remaster, Final Fantasy XII: The Zodiac Age changed this system by adding a class (or job) system in which classes could be changed, and they each had separate License Boards.

== In shooter games ==
Many multiplayer shooter games use class systems to provide different tactics and styles of play and promote teamwork and cooperation. These classes may only have differences through equipment, or they may feature notable gameplay differences. Most games do not allow players to use elements of multiple classes at the same time, though they typically allow players to switch classes before or during a match through a menu. Some games have progression systems for each individual class with class-specific unlockable items.

Examples of shooter games with classes include the Battlefield series, Star Wars Battlefront II, Rising Storm 2: Vietnam, and Insurgency: Sandstorm. All of these examples include a "heavy" or "support" class, a less-mobile class armed with some sort of machine gun that is focused around suppressive fire and team support; they also include classes that are simply the standard rifleman class with additional unique equipment (such as "demolitions" classes, typically riflemen with additional explosive items).

One notable example is the 2007 team-based shooter Team Fortress 2, which features nine distinct classes divided into three categories: Offense, Defense, and Support. Offense classes (Scout, Soldier, Pyro) specialize in assaulting and overwhelming enemies to complete objectives; Defense classes (Demoman, Heavy, Engineer) specialize in defending positions and hindering enemy advances; and Support classes (Medic, Sniper, Spy) specialize in assisting their team in different ways. Each of these classes feature notable gameplay differences that are meant to suit their categories, yet do not limit them from being used for both offense and defense playstyles to varying degrees of effectiveness. They also all have strengths and weaknesses in a rock paper scissors-esque style; for example, the Spy is strong against slow or sedentary classes such as the Heavy and Sniper, with equipment that specifically counters the Engineer's constructions, but his stealth abilities are nullified by the Pyro's fire, and he is impractical against more mobile classes such as the Scout. Each class is also treated as its own character, with unique personalities, backstories, and interactions with other classes.

A derivative of these types of classes are seen in hero shooters, where each hero has distinct abilities and weapons that often combine archetypical conventional classes or are unique on their own.

== See also ==
- Alternate character
