= Pixel Dungeon =

2012 video game

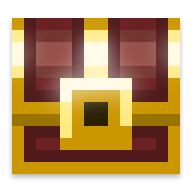

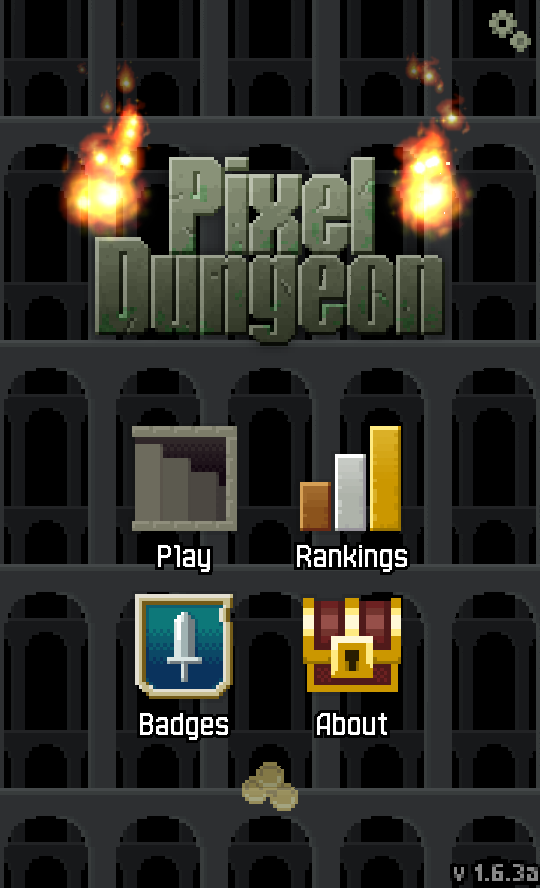
- Screenshot Title screen
- Developer: Watabou
- Release: late 2012
- Stable release: v1.9.2 / 1 December 2015
- Written in: Java
- Platform: Android, iOS, Windows, macOS, Linux
- Available in: English
- Type: Roguelike
- License: GPLv3
- Website: pixeldungeon.watabou.ru
- Repository: github.com/watabou/pixel-dungeon

Pixel Dungeon is a 2012 roguelike indie game created by Oleg Dolya. Through turn-based gameplay, the player must descend a dungeon and battle through its floors to obtain the Amulet of Yendor. Initially developed for Android, it expanded to iOS and PC platforms. Dolya considers the game complete and stopped updating the game in 2015. However, it is open source, and many mods and games based on Pixel Dungeon's code have since been developed, the most notable of which is Shattered Pixel Dungeon. While it received little attention from game critics, the few who reviewed it found the gameplay addictive, striking a balance between approachability and the defining difficulty of roguelikes.

== Gameplay ==
Pixel Dungeon is a simple roguelike video game with pixel art graphics. Players are tasked with obtaining the immortality-giving Amulet of Yendor by descending down the floors of a dangerous dungeon filled with monsters and magical creatures. Like other roguelikes, death is permanent and requires the player to start from the very beginning with a new game.

Before every game, the player must choose a character class to play as. The starting characters are the Warrior, Mage, and Rogue, each of which has unique abilities. A further class, the Huntress, can be unlocked later after defeating the third boss. Gameplay is turn-based and tile-based. Every time the player character moves or uses an item counts as at least one turn; in-game time progresses and enemies move every turn.

The player descends through maze-like floors and sections, progressing from a sewer, an abandoned prison, caves, a Dwarven city, and demonic underworld. Each floor's layout is procedurally generated and random. There are 25 levels, with shops and a boss fight every five levels. NPCs can appear and give players quests in exchange for items.

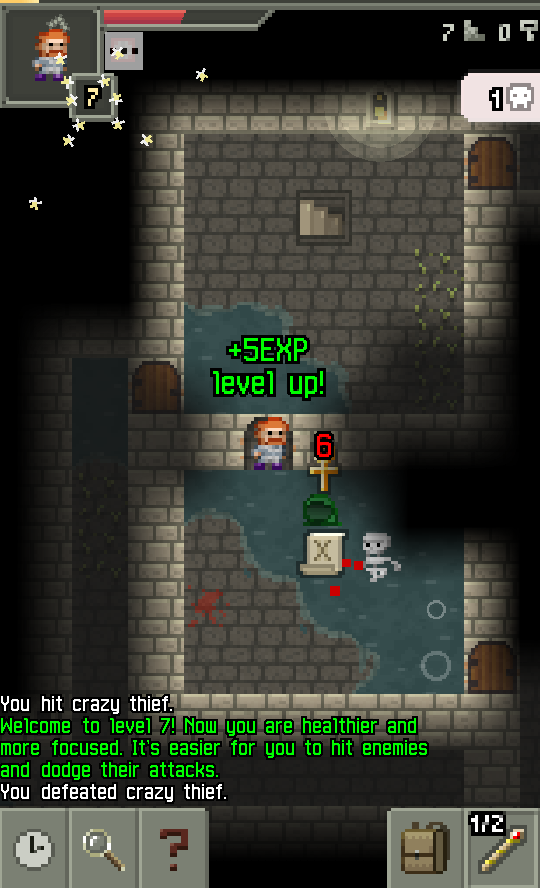
A screenshot, showing the player defeating an enemy and leveling up

The player can attack enemies with melee weapons such as a sword, or use ranged weapons such as wands. Armor can be equipped which provides absorption against melee attacks. Rings can be equipped which provide bonuses to the player. Equipment can be upgraded, which enhances their stats. Weapons and armor can also be enchanted, giving them an extra effect. Newfound equipment and consumable items must be identified before its stats are known, such as its upgrade level or damage. Contrasting with enchantments, some pieces of equipment may be cursed, harming the player instead. The player has a range of items at their disposal. Magical items of potions and scrolls each have unique effects, but are initially unidentified; potions and scrolls are shown with a color and glyph respectively, but the effects of each is random and initially unknown. These effects are not persistent across runs, and will change each game. For example, an orange-colored potion may heal the player in one playthrough, but the same orange potion could poison them in another.

The player levels up by gaining experience points from killing enemies. This increases their maximum health points and effectiveness in combat. Enemies sometimes drop equipment or gold. Gold is used as money to purchase items in shops which appear below every boss level. The player must also find and eat food, or they will begin to starve and eventually die.

== Background ==
Pixel Dungeon was created by Oleg "Watabou" Dolya, an independent developer. Dolya was inspired by another roguelike, Brogue, released in 2009. By July 2014, it had over one million downloads on Google Play. Dolya released the game for iOS in July 2015, but stopped working on the game shortly after, considering it complete.

== Reception ==
Pixel Dungeon was highly praised by players upon release. In a 4.5-star review, TouchArcade's Andrew Koziara thought that it struck a good balance between approachability and the unforgiving difficulty of roguelikes by streamlining their mechanics, but found that the purpose of many items remained unclear. Koziara and John Walker of Rock Paper Shotgun enjoyed exploring the dungeon and learning the details over time. The few critics who reviewed the game found it addictive and appropriately difficult. Android Central and GamesRadar+ included it on their list of the best Android games in 2022. Pixel Dungeon was considered the best open source video games according to The Gamer.

== Open-sourcing and derivatives ==
Pixel Dungeon attracted a small community of fans who started a subreddit and Wikia for the game, which TouchArcade's Koziara recommended for confused players. In 2014, Dolya made Pixel Dungeon open-source; since then, many mods and even standalone games have been released based off this code. Aside from Shattered Pixel Dungeon, other games include Skillful Pixel Dungeon, Yet Another Pixel Dungeon, and Remixed Dungeon: Pixel Rogue. These games all have the same base mechanics, something Bo Thompson tried to avoid when developing Pixel Odyssey.

=== Shattered Pixel Dungeon ===
Shattered Pixel Dungeon
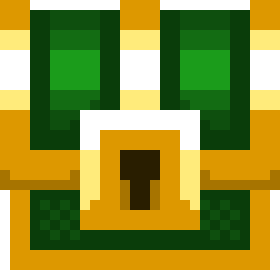

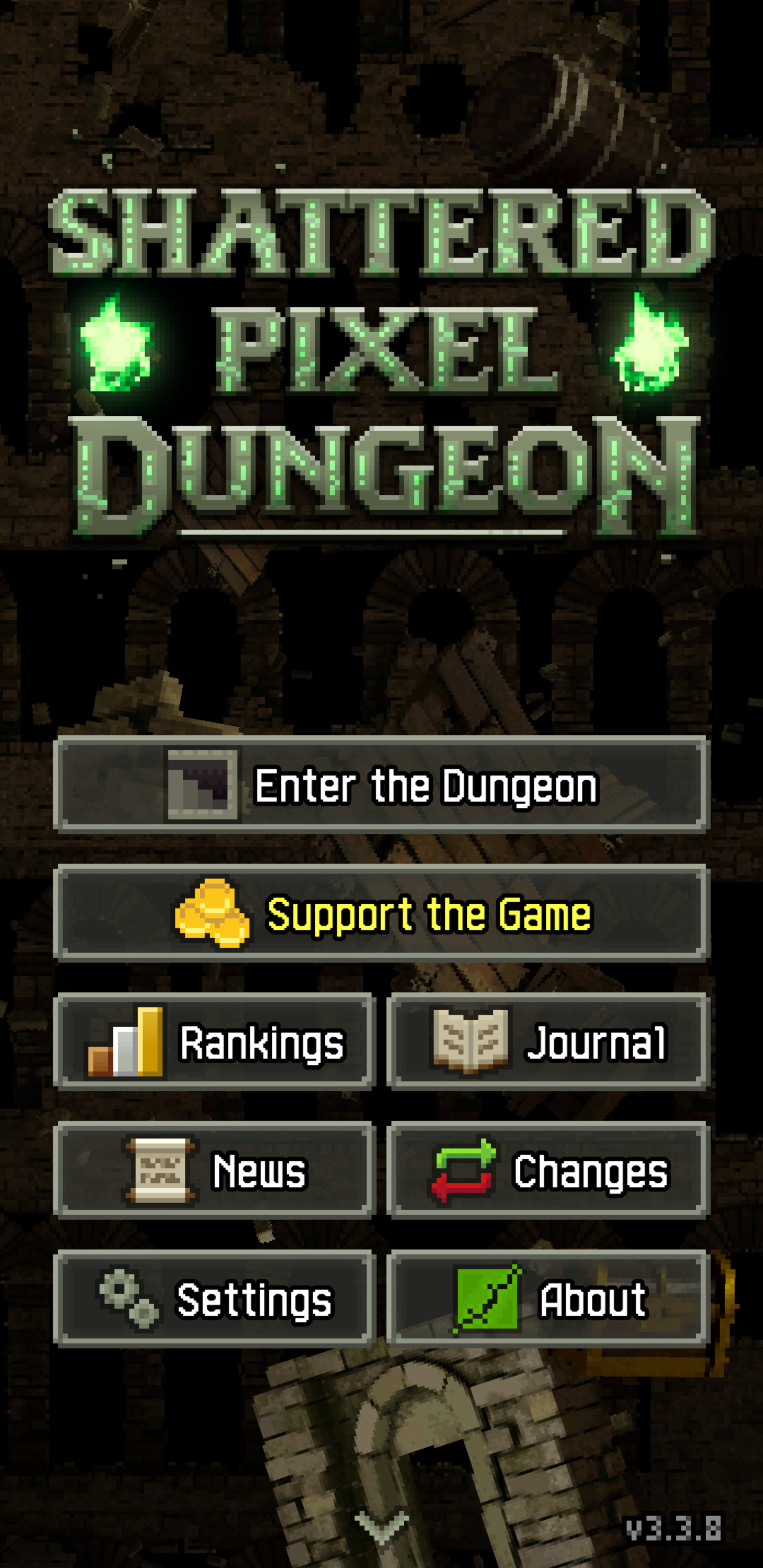
- Screenshot Title screen as of v3.3.8
- Developer: Evan Debenham
- Release: 17 August 2021
- Stable release: v4.0.2 / 8 October 2026
- Written in: Java
- Engine: libGDX
- Operating system: Android, iOS, Windows, macOS, Linux
- Type: Roguelike
- License: GPLv3
- Website: shatteredpixel.com
- Repository: github.com/00-Evan/shattered-pixel-dungeon

One of the most notable examples of Pixel Dungeon forks is Shattered Pixel Dungeon, created by Evan Debenham. Debenham, a novice Canadian developer, started working on Shattered Pixel Dungeon shortly after Pixel Dungeon went open-source in 2014. It was initially available only for Android. Debenham intended to work on balance out item benefits in Pixel Dungeon for several months, but it took seven years of continuous updates for version 1.0 to ultimately release in August 2021, coinciding with the iOS release. It is currently Debenham's primary project and main source of income.

Shattered Pixel Dungeon incorporates many major changes and tweaks compared to its predecessor. It features six hero classes instead of four (Warrior, Mage, Rogue, Huntress, Duelist, Cleric), more items, updated gameplay mechanics, new graphics, challenges, and new dungeon bosses. It is also available in many other languages than English. It features its own original soundtrack. Heroes also have subclasses they each can specialize in. Nevertheless, most basic gameplay elements are retained, such as potion effect randomization, enchantments/curses, and turn-based combat.

The initial release received mostly positive reviews. TouchArcade's John Nelson praised the v1.0 release as "a finely honed version of [Pixel Dungeon] with even more content and a much more approachable feel". The Indonesian website, Tech in Asia, found it enjoyable but notes that it did not meaningfully expand on Pixel Dungeon's core. Shattered Pixel Dungeon has since become considered one of the best open-source video games of all time. In Linux Magazine, Graham Morris included the PC version on his FOSSPicks, praising the "beautiful" 8-bit graphics and music and "addictive" gameplay.

More recent reviews have also been very positive. Den of Geek's Margaret David found the game to be addictive and full of content. She also praised the consistent and substantial updates. However, David also conceded that "it’s not loaded with all of the fixings of a ToME or an ADOM". Neil Mohr reviewed the game in a July 2022 issue of Linux Format, and rated it 9/10. He enjoyed the tutorials, calling them "a great touch because it doesn't overload you with information", and concluded that the game was "rewarding and challenging". In a four-star 2021 review, 148Apps's Campbell Bird praised the game's variety and options, saying the game has "hundreds of items to come across, over 50 enemies, and all kinds of modifying equipment that make sure that each game you play is unique". However, he also found that, because of its procedural generation, runs can be either satisfying or frustrating—sometimes, Bird could intuit whether he could successfully continue the run based on the items he had obtained early-on.

=== Eternity Pixel Dungeon ===
Eternity Pixel Dungeon
- Developers: Tecnopay Studios, Tonymanpro
- Release: 2026
- Stable release: v1.2.1 / 19 August 2026
- Written in: Java
- Engine: libGDX
- Operating system: Android, iOS, Windows
- Type: Roguelike
- License: GPLv3
- Website: eternity-pixel-dungeon.web.app
- Repository: https://github.com/tonymanpro/Eternity-Pixel.Dungeon

Eternity Pixel Dungeon is an expanded fork of Shattered Pixel Dungeon that introduces a variety of new mechanics and content, seeking to offer players a more robust and customized roguelike experience. The game is developed by Tecnopay Studios | Tonymanpro and stands out for its unique blend of classic mechanics with modern RPG features.

While maintaining the core structure of its predecessor, Eternity Pixel Dungeon adds two brand-new hero classes: the Barbarian, focused on raw power and rage mechanics (like Bloodlust and Fury), and a secret playable character, the Rat King, who possesses entirely unique abilities. Additionally, it implements a comprehensive Pet System allowing players to incubate and raise companions such as Dragons, Wolves, and Spiders and Manticore, each with tactical orders and feeding mechanics.

The game goes further by offering high-resolution graphics and an original proprietary soundtrack that sets it apart visually and auditorily. The development also emphasizes heavy community integration, with a built-in "Battle Pass" progression system and support for automated regression testing via an AI bot designed to evaluate new dungeon layouts and balancing changes.
