= Brogue =

Brogue may refer to:

== Language ==
- Brogue (accent), regionally accented English, especially Irish-accented
- Mission brogue, an accent of English spoken in the Mission District of San Francisco
- Ocracoke brogue, a family of English dialects in the South Atlantic United States
- Ottawa Valley Brogue, historical accents of English in the Ottawa River valley of Canada

== Other uses ==
- Brogue (video game), a free roguelike computer video game
- Brogue, Pennsylvania, an unincorporated community in York County
- Brogue shoe, a style of low-heeled shoe or boot
- Roslyn Brogue (1919–1981), American classical composer and educator

== See also ==
- Brough (disambiguation)
