= Ancient Domains of Mystery =

1994 roguelike video game

- Developers: Thomas Biskup; Jochen Terstiege; Zeno Rogue; Krzysztof Dycha; Lucas Dieguez
- Publisher: Thomas Biskup
- Platforms: AmigaOS, MS-DOS, Linux, Windows, OS X
- Release: Linux: NA: 1994; WW: 16 November 2015 (HD re-release); Amiga: NA: 1995; MS-DOS: WW: 28 January 1996; Windows: WW: 28 January 1996; WW: 16 November 2015 (HD re-release); OS X: WW: 16 November 2015 (HD re-release)
- Genre: Roguelike
- Mode: Single-player

Ancient Domains of Mystery is a roguelike video game designed and developed by Thomas Biskup and released in 1994. The player's goal is to stop the forces of Chaos that invade the world of Ancardia. The game has been identified as one of the "major roguelikes" by John Harris.

Like the original roguelike games, Ancient Domains of Mystery uses ASCII graphics to represent the game world. A later version added the option to play with sound, tile-based graphics, and an overworld map. Most dungeons are procedurally generated, but once the game generates a dungeon, it does not change even if the player exits and re-enters it.

Biskup ceased development of the game for nine years and revisited it in 2012. He then resumed work on a sequel, Ultimate ADOM, an engine for future roguelike games. Biskup first made an updated version of Ancient Domains of Mystery available to sponsors of his crowdfunding campaign. Later versions, beginning with v1.15.2.r60, were released on the internet and through digital distribution services.

== Plot ==
Text-only screenshot

Ancient Domains of Mystery takes place in the fictional world of Ancardia, in the mountainous Drakalor Chain. For 6,000 years, the world has known relative peace, but recently reports have spread of the appearance of dangerous dungeons and frightening monsters. Khelavaster, a wise sage, discovers an ancient prophecy regarding the Coming of Chaos and propagates it to the peoples of the world. It speaks of a champion who will defend the world from the forces of Chaos in the Drakalor Chain.

Hearing of this prophecy, many would-be heroes set out. The player assumes control of one such adventurer. Ancient Domains of Mystery has multiple endings which consist of closing the Chaos gate, becoming a demigod, or committing a heroic sacrifice to stop the Chaos invasion.

== Gameplay ==
Ancient Domains of Mystery presents an initial choice of one (male or female) player character from twelve races and twenty-two character classes, the combination of which strongly affects gameplay, in both subtle and obvious ways. Among other traits, character development includes experience levels, statistics, and skills. Version 1.1.0 introduced a talent system, allowing further customization of characters, based on a hierarchical system of prerequisites.

During adventures, a player is likely to explore many areas and complete multiple quests. Which quests are available may depend on character experience level or alignment (lawful, neutral, or chaotic). Alignment also affects NPC and deity interaction with the character. How one solves a quest can also affect one's alignment, such that a chaotic character seeking redemption can eventually become lawful through his or her actions (or vice versa).

Ancient Domains of Mystery offers multiple ways of winning, which vary in difficulty. The regular ending that appeared first during development consists of locating and closing the gate through which the forces of Chaos infiltrate Ancardia. The player also has the option to enter the gate, providing access to special endings, which are generally considered more difficult to accomplish. Ancient Domains of Mystery's quest-centric, plot-driven structure owes as much to adventure games like Zork as to the hack-and-slash of sibling games like Angband.

=== Corruption ===
The forces of Chaos that have infiltrated Ancardia corrupt both the surrounding landscape and occasionally the player's character, causing mutations, such as antennae or a tail growing, alteration of existing body features or gaining (often involuntary) magical abilities. Some mutations are helpful, while others make the game much harder; many have elements of both. Players need to be resourceful and adaptable due to the randomness of these mutations. While there are limited opportunities in the game to mitigate or remove corruption effects, taking too long to close the Chaos gate causes the corruption rate to increase dramatically. After becoming fully corrupted, the game ends, as the character has become a "writhing mass of primal chaos". The chaotic ending requires the character to be almost fully corrupted.

Besides background corruption, some powerful chaotic artifacts can cause the character to become corrupted merely by carrying them. Other less powerful chaotic artifacts only corrupt when actively invoked or wielded. Generally, most artifacts and magic items are safe to carry and use, and only the most powerful items affect corruption rates.

=== Herbs ===
Herbs growing on some levels can be used to provide great benefits to the player. The growth of the herbs follows a slight modification of Conway's Game of Life. While any character can harvest these herbs to limited effect, characters with certain skills and class abilities have strong bonuses and can even plant their own herb seeds. Besides herbs, characters can also collect plant seeds, either to donate to farmers (for a small alignment shift to law) or plant in dungeons in order to grow trees (useful for making bridges or fletching).

=== Smithing ===
Players can improve their items through various methods, such as smithing or magical enhancement. Similarly, many items can be damaged or destroyed as a result of combat or other hazards. While special artifacts cannot be damaged or destroyed, they are also immune to any form of improvement. This presents a dilemma to characters who specialize in smithing: should they use powerful artifacts or enhanced items of their own design. It is possible for a patient, highly skilled smith to enhance weapons and armor to levels beyond that of most artifacts, but the time required may leave the character exposed to corruption.

=== Monster Memory ===
A "Monster Memory" records the character's (not the player's) knowledge about creatures in the game, becoming increasingly detailed as the player defeats more of each monster. Statistics such as hit points, experience value, and speed are revealed, with corresponding observed highs, lows, and averages. Besides the in-game statistics, fan-submitted descriptions of every monster in the game are presented, sometimes with hints on strengths and weaknesses.

=== Difficulty ===
No matter how powerful players get, there is always a way for them to die if they become careless. In rare cases, instant deaths are possible from using cursed equipment or gaining the "doomed" intrinsic. Some monsters have powerful abilities that need specific counters, necessitating a change in strategy from traditional roguelike games. Some items have powerful effects on monsters. Undead beings are burnt to ash by holy symbols, and chaos beings are badly hurt by thrown potions of cure corruption. Strengths and weaknesses are often revealed in the monster memory and through rumors.

Death of player characters is meant to be permanent. The game exits after saving, effectively limiting savefiles to one per character, and the savefile is erased upon loading.

== Development ==
Development of Ancient Domains of Mystery started on 12 July 1994 and continued steadily until 20 November 2002. Core development on the game stopped with the release of version 1.1.1. Beta-quality ports to Mac OS X of this version appeared in 2006. Plans for future versions had not at that time been announced, but a next-generation successor to Ancient Domains of Mystery, called JADE, started development and betas have since been released. The developer later renamed Jade to Ancient Domains of Mystery II, leaving Jade as a game engine name.

In July 2012 a crowdfunding campaign was initiated by Thomas Biskup to resurrect Ancient Domains of Mystery development. The campaign reached its initial goal of $48,000 on 22 August, 51 days after starting, and finished at $90,169. Ancient Domains of Mystery entered the Steam Greenlight in May 2014.

As of April 2026, a classic version is available at the main site free of charge, with two variants: the text-only version with wide platform support, and the graphical version (which also includes text-only mode) for Windows, MacOSX and Linux. A paid version is available on Steam as Ancient Domains of Mystery Deluxe with enhanced gameplay features and gameplay customization.

Although Ancient Domains of Mystery classic version is available free of charge, unlike most roguelikes its source code is unavailable. Despite earlier announcing that the source code would be published after the release of version 1.0, Biskup later chose to reserve it for himself in order to retain some mystery about game operation and to curtail the spread of unsanctioned variants. Despite this stance, he is open to licensing the source to capable developers to form a commercial venture. Players meanwhile have deduced underlying mechanisms through careful experimentation and reverse-engineering by inspecting the execution flow, memory and binaries of the game.

Biskup credits his game's community following as the main reason for both of his games existence. He emphasized the importance of listening to their ideas and said he received great feedback from them through the years of development. Though most of his fan encounters are positive, he stated that he received death threats when he declined to release the game's source code and on one occasion, keen fans stalked his house.

== Reception ==
Reception

Review scores
Publication	Score
The Good Old Days	4 of 6
Abandonia	3.0 of 5.0

Ancient Domains of Mystery has established a strong fan base that started gathering since 1997 at Usenet group rec.games.roguelike.adom, sporting 2,000-3,000 messages monthly in years of active development, although lately the activity has been ceasing.

Given that Ancient Domains of Mystery was a long-lasting development effort and new versions of the game were regularly released over the years, Ancient Domains of Mystery has received many critical reviews over many varied versions. The overall critical reception is good.

Reviewers usually compare Ancient Domains of Mystery to other roguelike games (like Rogue, Angband or Moria) and find that Ancient Domains of Mystery offers a much deeper storyline, more manifold environment, and is generally more complex. Most note that Ancient Domains of Mystery offers very high replay value and general randomness of events that happen in the game. Overall game system design (and especially the character development system) is usually praised for its flexibility. Some reviews note low hardware requirements and freeware distribution as essential advantages.

The user interface is cited to have high learning curve by some critics, while others note that it is "brilliant in its simplicity", "very practical" and "easy to navigate". Keyboard controls imply usage of the numeric keypad which makes Ancient Domains of Mystery relatively hard to play on keyboards without keypads (i.e. some laptop keyboards). Discussing gameplay, the same complexity and randomness that were cited as positive features are sometimes said to make Ancient Domains of Mystery very difficult for beginning players. Most reviewers agree that Ancient Domains of Mystery may be very hard to play for beginners due to the deletion of savefiles, which is uncommon for games outside the roguelike genre.
