= GNU GLOBAL =

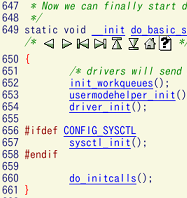
- Source code for the Linux kernel 2.6.18 annotated by GNU GLOBAL
- Developer(s): GNU project
- Stable release: 6.6.14 / 11 December 2024; 3 months ago
- Repository: cvs.savannah.gnu.org/viewvc/global/
- Operating system: Unix-like
- Type: Programming tool (Specifically: Code navigation tool)
- License: GNU GPL
- Website: www.gnu.org/software/global/

GNU GLOBAL is a software tool for source code tagging to aid code comprehension. It works in a uniform fashion in various environments (GNU Emacs, Vim, GNU less, GNU Bash, web browsers, etc.), allowing users to find all objects declared in the source files and to move among them easily. It is particularly useful for working on projects containing numerous sub-projects and complex syntax trees generated by the compilation process (e.g., C code containing numerous #ifdef directive which select among several main() functions using conditional compilation). It is similar to older tagging software such as ctags and etags, but differs in its independence from any specific text editor.

GNU GLOBAL is free software maintained for the GNU project by Shigio Yamaguchi.

== Use cases ==
Use cases are varied, and include traversing the source code of the Linux kernel, browsing Ruby code after having analyzed it with Exuberant ctags or rtags, examining the structure of software packages in HTML mode, or exploring a large and unfamiliar codebase.

== Usage by other software ==
GLOBAL is used by other software, including GNU Automake. FreeBSD uses it in its build system.

== See also ==
- Debug symbol
