= Angband =

Angband may refer to:

- Angband (Middle-earth), the fortress of Morgoth in Tolkien's fiction
- Angband (video game), a roguelike game named after the fortress
- Angband (band), Persian-American rock band
