= Ninja Tag Team: Slash n' Dash =

- App icon
- Developer: Gortyn Code
- Publisher: Gortyn Code
- Designer: Konstantinos Apostolakis
- Programmer: Konstantinos Apostolakis
- Artist: Konstantinos Apostolakis
- Composer: Konstantinos Apostolakis
- Platform: Android
- Release: WW: May 12, 2019
- Genre: Endless runner
- Mode: Single-player

Ninja Tag Team: Slash n' Dash is an endless running video game created by Greek indie developer Konstantinos Apostolakis under the name of "Gortyn Code". The game was released for Android on 12 May 2019.

== Gameplay ==
Gameplay.

In Ninja Tag Team: Slash n' Dash players assume control over a duo of ninja characters with unique capabilities, one of which has the exclusive ability to jump (but cannot attack), while the other can exclusively attack (but cannot jump). As such, players are required to switch between the two characters on-the-fly, so as to collect coins, slay, or avoid enemies, and jump over pitfalls in six procedurally generated levels. Players control the game by timely tapping on the two available buttons, which allow them to either swap between characters or perform the selected character's action (either jump or attack).

Regular enemies are stationary and can appear either individually or "stacked" in groups of two or three (shown as ninjas lifting other ninjas on their shoulders). A stack of three enemies can only be cleared by attacking, while stacks of two enemies can either be attacked, or jumped over. Each level contains a unique boss, who appears when the player has slain a total of 50 enemies. Each boss has a unique attack pattern, and requires a different strategy to be defeated. In some cases, players have to interact with various items in the environment, such as hanging lanterns or cannons in order to damage the boss, or create an opening for an attack. When bosses are hit three times, the game reverts to spawning regular enemies.

The coins players collect can be used to buy power-ups, granting the player special abilities, such as clearing the screen of enemies, or becoming invincible for a short period of time. Alternatively, players can use the coins to rebuild their ninja village, adding buildings that double as power-up factories, generating new power-ups in regular intervals. While in the village screen, players can encounter various characters (spawning at random), who reward players with either coins or power-ups for completing various quests, such as defeating a specific number of enemies, or defeating a level boss. Players can also purchase up to three power-up slots, allowing them to use combinations of power ups simultaneously. During boss fights however, power-ups are deactivated.

== Plot ==
The game is set somewhere in the Edo period of Japanese history, and centers around the fictional rivalry between the Kyokusei (Polarity) and Tokui-ten (Singularity) Ninja clans. After suffering a devastating attack on Kyokusei village, the last remaining Genin of the Clan named Hitoshi and Kanaye, resort to a life of banditry, teaming up to take out Tokui-ten's Generals and restore Kyokusei village to its former glory.

=== Characters ===
Playable

- Hitoshi - clad in red and described as a "pacifist", this playable character has the exclusive ability to jump. As such, Hitoshi is the only character who can make use of the Double Jump power up.
- Kanaye - described as a warrior, this playable character is clad in black robes. He has the exclusive ability to attack enemies (including bosses), but cannot jump.

Tokui-ten Generals

- The Onna-bugeisha - described as "a formidable foe and master of long-range combat", she will launch war fans in two different altitudes while remaining at the right edge of the screen, out of the player's reach. Her design was inspired by the historical onna-musha female Japanese warriors.
- The Komusō - described as "a master of ichi on jo butsu", he uses a shakuhachi bamboo flute launching note projectiles at the player. When hit by a note, the player character is significantly slowed down, allowing the Komusō to strike with his naginata at regular game speed. This boss' appearance was inspired by the komusō monks, who flourished during the Edo period, although it is never mentioned in-game whether this character truly is a monk or a disguised ninja spy.
- The Wakō Captain - described as "a former Korean admiral", makes use of a matchlock hand cannon to punch holes in the platform the player is currently running on, causing it to slowly sink.
- The Akutô - described as "a powerfully-built, hulking Japanese bandit, who excels in hit-and-run combat tactics". This boss will usually run in the background, out of the player's reach, jumping out at regular intervals to surprise-attack the player.
- The Samurai - described as "a fierce warrior, whose heavy armor makes him almost indestructible", the Samurai is completely immune to the player's regular attacks.
- The Ninja Jōnin - described as "a legendary warrior and master of illusion", has the ability to "split" into multiple bodies, attacking the player whenever one of the decoys is hit instead of the main target.

Other

- The Merchant - This character is the only one consistently appearing in the village screen, enabling players to exchange game coins for power-ups, or pay real money to purchase in-game currency.

=== Levels ===
Ninja Tag Team: Slash n' Dash features six levels, each with a different environment and music. Players can select between levels at the Main menu screen, swiping either left or right to match the main menu background visuals with the environment corresponding to the level they wish to launch. The following levels have been available since launch:

- Sakura Forest: This level features a dense, endless Japanese cherry blossom forest. This level is the home of the Onna-bugeisha Tokui-ten General.
- Iga Mountains: This level features a snowy mountainside. It is the home of the Komusō Tokui-ten General.
- Storm Ocean: This level features a rough ocean theme, and was inspired by The Great Wave off Kanagawa. It is the home of the Wakō Captain Tokui-ten General.
- Cliff-side Harvest: This level features an endless array of cliff-side wheat fields overlooking the ocean. It is the home of the Akutô Tokui-ten General.
- Burning Village: This level features an unnamed, burning Japanese medieval village. Presumably, the player arrives at this village while it is being raided by the Tokui-ten, led by the Samurai General. This is the only level not to feature traditional pitfalls, opting instead for fiery obstacles, which cause the player to disappear in a puff of smoke upon contact.
- Rooftops: This level features an unnamed Japanese medieval village during a downpour. Players traverse the environment by jumping on an endless array of building rooftops. It is where the Ninja Jōnin General boss can be encountered.

== Development and release ==
Ninja Tag Team: Slash n' Dash was developed solely by indie developer Konstantinos C. Apostolakis over the course of two years. Development on the game began in 2017. The main goal was to make the game play similar to Gortyn Code's 2015 first title, Chip Rush, but introducing new elements, more appealing graphics, and a more engaging setting. Initially, the plan was to update the visuals of Chip Rush and re-release the game within a time frame of only a couple of months. However, new ideas for boss battles and power-ups were introduced during development, and eventually Apostolakis decided to abandon the libGDX-based Chip Rush small-scale project in order to redesign the game from the ground up, and rebuild it in Unity.

Ninja Tag Team: Slash n' Dash was announced on May 12, 2019 with the game receiving an international release in the Google Play Store immediately. The game's launch trailer was released on YouTube at the same time.

== Reception ==
The game was voted as a runner-up for "Greek Game of the Year" by Greek media and entertainment website GameWorld.gr users for its annual Game of the Year Awards 2019.
