= Delver =

2018 video game

- Developer: Priority Interrupt
- Designer: Chad Cuddigan
- Programmer: Chad Cuddigan
- Artist: Joshua Skelton
- Composer: Tobias Arnold
- Engine: libGDX
- Platforms: Linux; macOS; Microsoft Windows
- Release: 2 February 2018
- Genre: Roguelike
- Mode: Single-player

Delver is a 2018 first-person roguelike action dungeon crawler video game developed by Priority Interrupt. It was released for Microsoft Windows, macOS, and Linux on February 2, 2018.

== Gameplay ==
Delver is a first-person roguelike where players assume the role of an explorer as they explore the dungeons in search of the Yithidian Orb. The game's mechanics and presentation is similar to the dungeons of The Legend of Zelda, while incorporating random, procedurally-generated levels in the manner of a roguelike game. There is no jump button. The game always starts on a campfire where weapons and scrolls can be acquired, with a randomly generated loot that includes 2 weapons and 2 potions/food. On each level, the player must explore until they find the rope ladder that can take them to the next level, while avoiding traps and enemies. Dungeons contain varied loot, like potions (whose effects are not revealed until the player actually consumes them), lamps/candles (that work as light sources), books, armor, skulls, luxury items (that are automatically traded for gold), wands, arrows, and melee weapons. Defeating enemies grants experience, once enough experience is gathered, the player will advance one level; something that will grant them an extra hit point and one point to assign to three random stats that vary with every level reached. The player's health is tracked by a number of hearts; if the character loses all his hearts, the game ends in permadeath and the player must start over from a freshly-generated dungeon.

== Development and release ==
In April 2012, an alpha was commercially released for Android. The last update was received in December 2013. The game was placed on an open vote on Steam Greenlight on August 30, 2012, and was greenlit a year later. The game was released to Steam Early Access on September 6, 2013. The game continued to receive updates, and on February 2, 2018, Priority Interrupt officially released the game out of early access for Windows, macOS, and Linux, with a level editor and Steam Workshop support. In November 2018, the source code for the game was released on GitHub under the terms of the GNU General Public License version 2, but now it is currently using the zlib License.

== Reception ==
A 2012 alpha build for Android was reviewed by Paul Devlin from Pocket Gamer, who rated it 4/5, praising the "fluid experience" of the alpha build, but criticized the "clunky" inventory system. The 2013 initial Steam Early Access release was reviewed by John Walker from Rock Paper Shotgun, who criticized the lack of collectibles and noted a lack of "purpose", and suggesting the inclusion of shops, while also praising its potential. A 2016 build was reviewed by Brendan Caldwell (also from Rock Paper Shotgun) who praised the opening moments and liked the absence of any plot and the additions to it since the initial 2013 release. It was included in the "10 Mac games you need to play from February 2018" list by Andrew Hayward for Macworld.
