= Ken Arnold =

American computer programmer (born 1958)

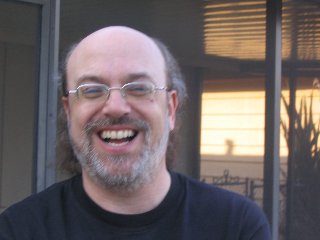
- Arnold in 2006
- Born: Kenneth Cutts Richard Cabot Arnold; 13 June 1958 (age 68)
- Education: University of California, Berkeley (BA)
- Occupation: Programmer
- Known for: Rogue, contributions to BSD UNIX

Kenneth Cutts Richard Cabot Arnold (born 13 June 1958) is an American computer programmer well known as one of the developers of the 1980s dungeon-crawling video game Rogue, for his contributions to the original Berkeley Software Distribution (BSD) version of Unix, for his books and articles about C and C++, e.g., his 1980s–1990s UNIX Review column, "The C Advisor", and his high-profile work on the Java platform.

== At Berkeley ==
Arnold attended the University of California, Berkeley, after having worked at Lawrence Berkeley National Laboratory computer labs for a year, receiving his BA degree in computer science in 1985. At Berkeley, he was president of the Berkeley Computer Club (later known as the Computer Science Undergraduates Association), and made many contributions to the 2BSD and 4BSD Berkeley Unix distributions, including:

- curses and termcap: a hardware-independent library for controlling cursor movement, screen editing, and window creation on ASCII display terminals, based on termcap (based on Bill Joy's vi screen control code). Curses was a landmark display library that made it possible for a vast number of new applications to create full-screen user interfaces that were portable between different brands of display terminal.
- Rogue: Arnold, Michael Toy, and Glenn Wichman co-wrote Rogue, a full-screen role-playing video game that presented a then-novel view of the "dungeon" from above (rather than via textual description as in the older Zork and Adventure). It spawned an entire genre of "roguelike" games.
- fortune: a fortune cookie program. Although Arnold's quote-displaying program was not the first in history, as the BSD standard it became by far the most widely used, and its database of quotes was voluminous. It also standardized a plain-text file format that was philosophically aligned with Unix and thus became widely used both for other fortune programs as well as non-fortune purposes.
- ctags: a program for generating cross-references in computer source code.

== Selected bibliography ==
- JavaSpaces. Principles, Patterns, and Practice; Eric Freeman, Susanne Hupfer, Ken Arnold; ISBN 0-201-30955-6
- The Java Programming Language; 4th Edition; Ken Arnold, James Gosling, David Holmes; ISBN 0-321-34980-6
  - Sample chapter: A Taste of Java's I/O Package: Streams, Files, and So Much More
- The Jini(TM) Specification, 2nd Edition; Ken Arnold, Jim Waldo and the rest of the Jini technology team. Part of the official Jini Technology Series, published by Addison Wesley.
- "Fear and Loathing on the UNIX Trail -- Confessions of a Berkeley system mole."; Doug Merritt with Ken Arnold and Bob Toxen; Unix Review, Jan 1985
- "Rogue: Where It has Been, Why It Was There, And Why It Shouldn't Have Been There In The First Place"; USENIX Conference Proceedings; Boston, July 1982, p. 139 ff; Ken C.R.C. Arnold, Michael C. Toy

== See also ==
- History of video games
- The Art of Unix Programming
