= Glenn Wichman =

Software developer

Glenn R. Wichman is a software developer and one of the original authors of the computer game Rogue, along with Michael Toy, Ken Arnold, and Jon Lane. Wichman has also contributed to many other commercial software programs, including Microsoft Bookshelf, Mavis Beacon Teaches Typing, and Quicken. He is the creator of the Macintosh shareware games Toxic Ravine and Mombasa.
