= Moria (1983 video game) =

1983 roguelike video game

The Dungeons of Moria
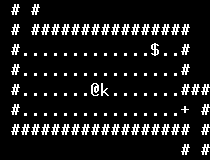
- Screenshot from a Moria-like game
- Developers: Robert Alan Koeneke (1957-2022); Jimmey Wayne Todd Jr.; James E. Wilson
- Release: 25 March 1983 (0.1)
- Stable release: 5.7.15 / 4 June 2021; 5 years ago
- Operating system: Cross-platform
- Available in: English
- Type: Roguelike
- License: GNU General Public License v3 or any later version
- Website: web.archive.org/web/20200221144759/http://www-math.bgsu.edu/~grabine/moria.html
- Repository: github.com/dungeons-of-moria/umoria

The Dungeons of Moria, usually referred to as simply Moria, (Note: Also called UMoria since its rework in C in 1987.) is a 1983 computer game, originally developed by Robert Alan Koeneke. Inspired by J. R. R. Tolkien's novel The Lord of the Rings, the objective of the game is to dive deep into the Mines of Moria and kill the Balrog. Moria, along with Hack (1984) and Larn (1986), is one of the first roguelike games, and the first to include a town level.

Moria was the basis of the better known Angband roguelike game, and influenced the preliminary design of Blizzard Entertainment's Diablo.

== Gameplay ==
The player's goal is to descend to the depths of Moria to defeat the Balrog, akin to a boss battle. As with Rogue, levels are not persistent: when the player leaves the level and then tries to return, a new level is procedurally generated. Among other improvements to Rogue, there is a persistent town at the highest level where players can buy and sell equipment.

Moria begins with creation of a character. The player first chooses a "race" from the following: Human, Half-Elf, Elf, Halfling, Gnome, Dwarf, Half-Orc, or Half-Troll. Racial selection determines base statistics and class availability. One then selects the character's "class" from the following: Warrior, Mage, Priest, Rogue, Ranger, or Paladin. Class further determines statistics, as well as the abilities acquired during gameplay. Mages, Rangers, and Rogues can learn magic, while Priests and Paladins can learn prayers. Warriors possess no additional abilities.

The player begins the game with a limited number of items on a town level consisting of six shops: (1) a General Store, (2) an Armory, (3) a Weaponsmith, (4) a Temple, (5) an Alchemy shop, and (6) a Magic-Users store. A staircase on this level descends into a series of randomly generated underground mazes. Deeper levels contain more powerful monsters and better treasures. Each time the player ascends or descends a staircase, a new level is created and the old one discarded; only the town persists throughout the game.

As in most roguelikes, it is impossible to reload from a save if the player's character dies, as the game saves the state only upon exit, preventing save-scumming that is a key strategy in most computer games that allow saving, although it is possible to save the file that is generated by the game (MORIA.SAV in the Windows version) to a backup location, then restore/replace that file after the character had been killed.

The balrog (represented by the upper-case letter B) is encountered at the deepest depths of the dungeon. Once the balrog has been killed, the game has been won, and no further saving of the game is possible.

=== Player characteristics ===
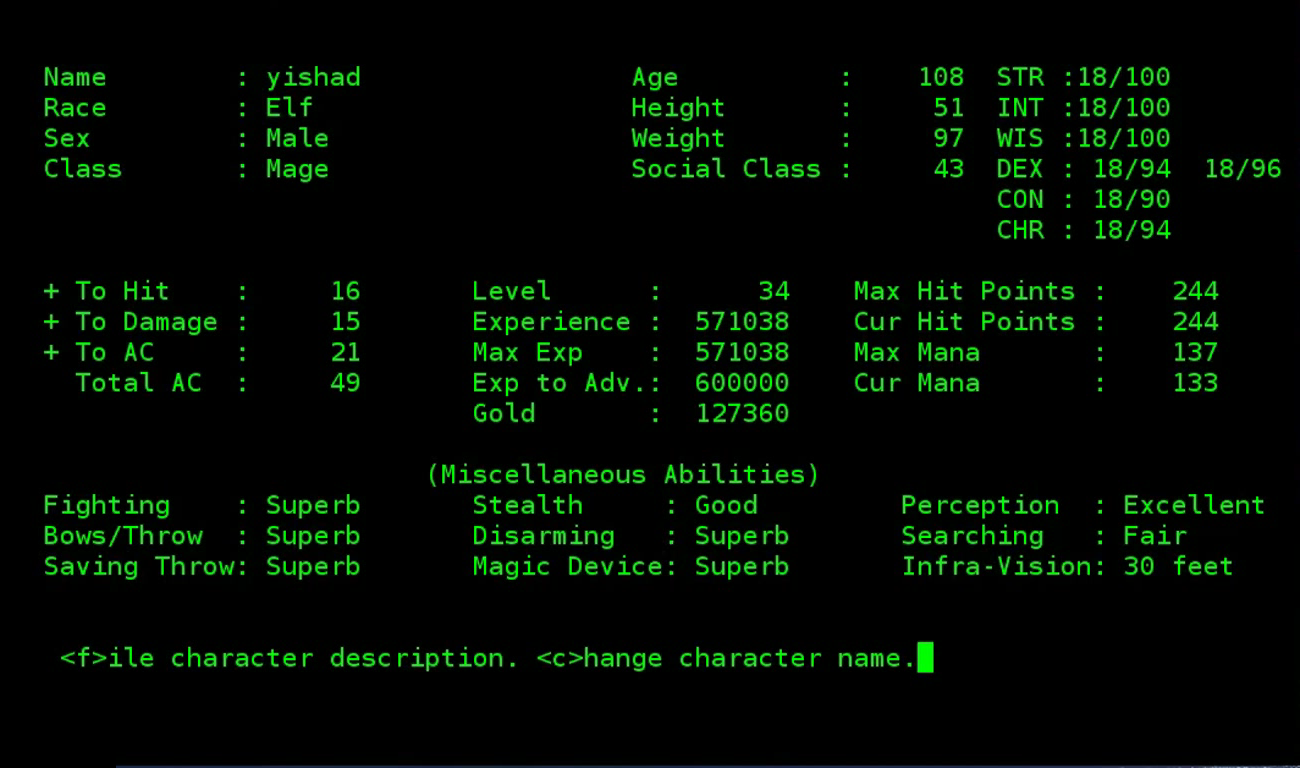
Character sheet for a level 34 elf mage

The player has many characteristics in the game. Some characteristics, like sex, weight, and height, cannot be changed once the player has been created, while other characteristics like strength, intelligence, and armor class can be modified by using certain items in a particular way. Mana and hit points are replenished by rest or by some other magical means. Gold accrues as the player steps on gems or currency. Experience accrues as the player performs various actions in the dungeon, mostly by killing creatures. The "miscellaneous abilities" are modified as each skill is performed and as the player increases in experience.

== History ==
Family tree of rogue-like games: inspiration for Moria goes back to Rogue.

Around 1981, while enrolled at the University of Oklahoma, Robert Alan Koeneke became hooked on playing the video game Rogue. Soon after, Koeneke moved departments to work on an early VAX-11/780 minicomputer running VMS operating system, which at that time had no games. Since no longer having access to Rogue was "intolerable" for Koeneke, he started developing his own Rogue game using VMS BASIC and gave it the name, Moria Beta 1.0.

During the summer of 1983, Koeneke rewrote his game in VMS Pascal, releasing Moria 1.0.

In 1983/84 Jimmey Wayne Todd Jr. joined Koeneke on the development of Moria, bringing with him his character generator, and working on various aspects of the game, including the death routines.

Koeneke started distributing the source code in 1985 under a license that permitted sharing and modification, but not commercial use.

The last VMS version was Moria 4.8, released in November 1986.

In February 1987, James E. Wilson started converting the VMS Pascal source code to the C programming language for use on UNIX systems, which had started to become popular by this date. To distinguish his release from the original VMS Moria, Wilson named it UNIX Moria, shortened to UMoria.

UMoria 4.85 was released on November 5, 1987.

As C was a much more portable programming language than VMS Pascal, there was an explosion of Moria ports for a variety of different computer systems such as MS-DOS, Amiga, Atari ST and Apple IIGS.

UMoria 5.0, released in 1989, unified these separate ports into a single code base, fixing many bugs and gameplay balance issues, as well as adding lots of new features; many of which were taken from BRUCE Moria (1988).

In 1990 the Angband project was started, which is based on the UMoria 5.2.1 source code.

UMoria was in continuous development for several more years, with UMoria 5.5.2 released on July 21, 1994.

During the early 2000s David Grabiner maintained the code base, releasing only minor compiler related fixes.

In 2008, through the work of the free-moria project, UMoria was relicensed under the GNU General Public License. Work has since continued on the game, with regular releases.

== See also ==
- List of roguelikes
