= Roslyn Brogue =

American classical composer (1919–1981)

Roslyn Brogue (16 February 1919 – 1 August 1981) was an American pianist, violinist, music educator, classics scholar, poet, author and composer. She was born in Chicago, Illinois, and graduated from the University of Chicago in 1937, from Radcliffe College in 1943 and from Harvard University in 1947 with a Ph.D.

After completing her education, she taught at the Cambridge School, Harvard University and Boston University. She took a position in 1962 teaching at Tufts University Department of Classics, and later taught in the Department of Music. She married composer Ervin Arthur Henning in 1944 in Massachusetts, and the couple divorced about 1969. They were among the first composers to write twelve tone compositions for recorder, Henning in 1951 and Brogue in 1955. Brogue died in Beverly, Massachusetts, and her papers are housed at Tufts University. Among her notable students is composer Earle Brown.

== Works ==
Selected works include:

- Adoramus Te (1938) for SATB chorus
- Sonatina (1954) for Flute, B-flat Clarinet, and Harpsichord
- Motet (1938)
- Allegretto (1948)
- Andante and Variations (1954–56)
