= Roguelike =

Subgenre of role-playing video games

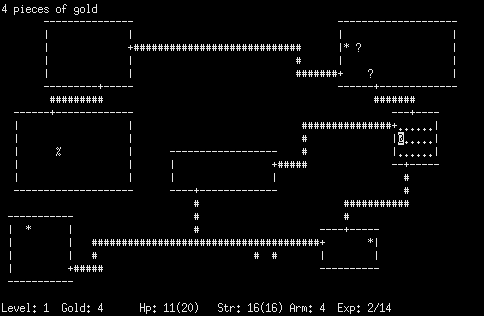
A procedurally generated dungeon in the 1980 video game Rogue, the game after which the roguelike genre is named

Roguelike (or rogue-like) is a style of role-playing video game traditionally characterized by a dungeon crawl through procedurally generated levels, turn-based gameplay, grid-based movement, and permanent death of the player character. Most roguelikes are based on a high fantasy narrative, reflecting the influence of tabletop role-playing games such as Dungeons & Dragons.

Though Beneath Apple Manor predates it, the 1980 game Rogue, an ASCII-based game that runs in a terminal or terminal emulator, is considered the forerunner and the namesake of the genre, with derivative games mirroring Rogue's character- or sprite-based graphics. These games were popularized among college students and computer programmers of the 1980s and 1990s, leading to hundreds of variants. Some of the better-known variants include Hack, NetHack, Ancient Domains of Mystery, Moria, Angband, Tales of Maj'Eyal, and Dungeon Crawl Stone Soup. The Japanese series of Mystery Dungeon games by Chunsoft, inspired by Rogue, also fall within the concept of roguelike games.

The exact definition of a roguelike game remains a point of debate in the video game community. A "Berlin Interpretation" drafted in 2008 defined a number of high- and low-value factors of "canon" roguelike games Rogue, NetHack and Angband, which have since been used to distinguish these roguelike games from edge cases like Diablo. Since then, with more powerful home computers and gaming systems and the rapid growth of indie video game development, several new "roguelikes" have appeared, with some but not all of these high-value factors, nominally the use of procedural generation and permadeath, while often incorporating other gameplay genres, thematic elements, and graphical styles; common examples of these include Spelunky, FTL: Faster Than Light, The Binding of Isaac, Slay the Spire, Crypt of the NecroDancer, and Hades. To distinguish these from traditional roguelikes, such games may be referred to as roguelite or roguelike-like. Despite this alternative naming suggestion, these games are often referred to as roguelike and use the roguelike tag on various marketplaces such as Steam.

== Origin ==
The term "roguelike" came from Usenet newsgroups around 1993, as this was the principal channel the players of roguelike games of that period were using to discuss these games, as well as what the developers used to announce new releases and even distribute the game's source code in some cases. With several individual groups for each game, it was suggested that with rising popularity of Rogue, Hack, Moria, and Angband, all of which shared common elements, that the groups be consolidated under an umbrella term to facilitate cross-game discussion. Debate among users of these groups ensued to try to find an encapsulating term that described the common elements, starting with rec.games.dungeon.*, but after three weeks of discussion, rec.games.roguelike.*, based on Rogue, which was at the time considered to be the oldest of these types of games, was picked as "the least of all available evils". By the time it was suggested that a group be created to discuss the development of these kind of games in 1998, the "roguelike" term was already established within the community. This usage parallels that of "Doom clone", a term used in the 1990s that later evolved into the more generic "first-person shooter".

== Gameplay and design ==
Drawing from the concepts of tabletop role-playing games such as Dungeons & Dragons, nearly all roguelikes give the player control of a character, which they may customize by selecting a class, or adjusting attributes points and skills. In some, further customization through selecting race and gender is possible. At the start of the game, the character is placed at the top-most level of a dungeon, with basic equipment such as a simple weapon, armor, torches, and food. Following along the role-playing concept of a dungeon crawl, the player moves the character through the dungeon, collecting treasure which can include new weapons, armours, magical devices, potions, scrolls, food, and money, while having to fight monsters that roam the dungeon. Most combat is performed simply by attempting to move the character into the same space as the monster. The game then calculates the damage that the character and monster deal. Other types of attacks, such as firing an arrow or performing an offensive magic spell, can often be performed as well.

Defeating monsters earns the character experience points, and after earning enough points, the character will gain an experience level, improving their hit points, magic capability, and other attributes. Monsters may drop treasure to be looted. The character dies if they lose all their hit points. As most roguelikes feature the concept of permadeath, this represents the end of the game, and the player will need to restart the game with a newly made character. Roguelikes are nearly always turn-based, with the game only reacting when the player makes an action with the character. This allows players to evaluate a difficult situation, such as being cornered by several monsters, at their own pace and determine the best strategy.

The player generally has to explore the dungeon to reveal its contents, similar to a fog of war. Many roguelikes include visibility elements, such as a torch to provide illumination to see monsters in nearby squares, or line of sight to limit which monsters are visible from the player's position. Dungeons tend to be connected by stairs; lower dungeon levels generally are more difficult than higher ones, so that an underdeveloped character will have difficulty progressing too fast. Dungeon levels and the population of monsters and treasure within them are generated randomly using procedural generation, so no game is the same on subsequent playthroughs. Most roguelikes have an ultimate goal of either claiming an item located at the deepest level of the dungeon, or defeating a specific monster that lives on that level. Typical roguelikes assess the player's performance at the end of the game through a score based on the amount of treasure, money, experience earned, and how fast the player finished the game, if they managed to do so. The score is displayed in a ranked scoreboard to compare the player's performance on successive runs.

=== Key features ===
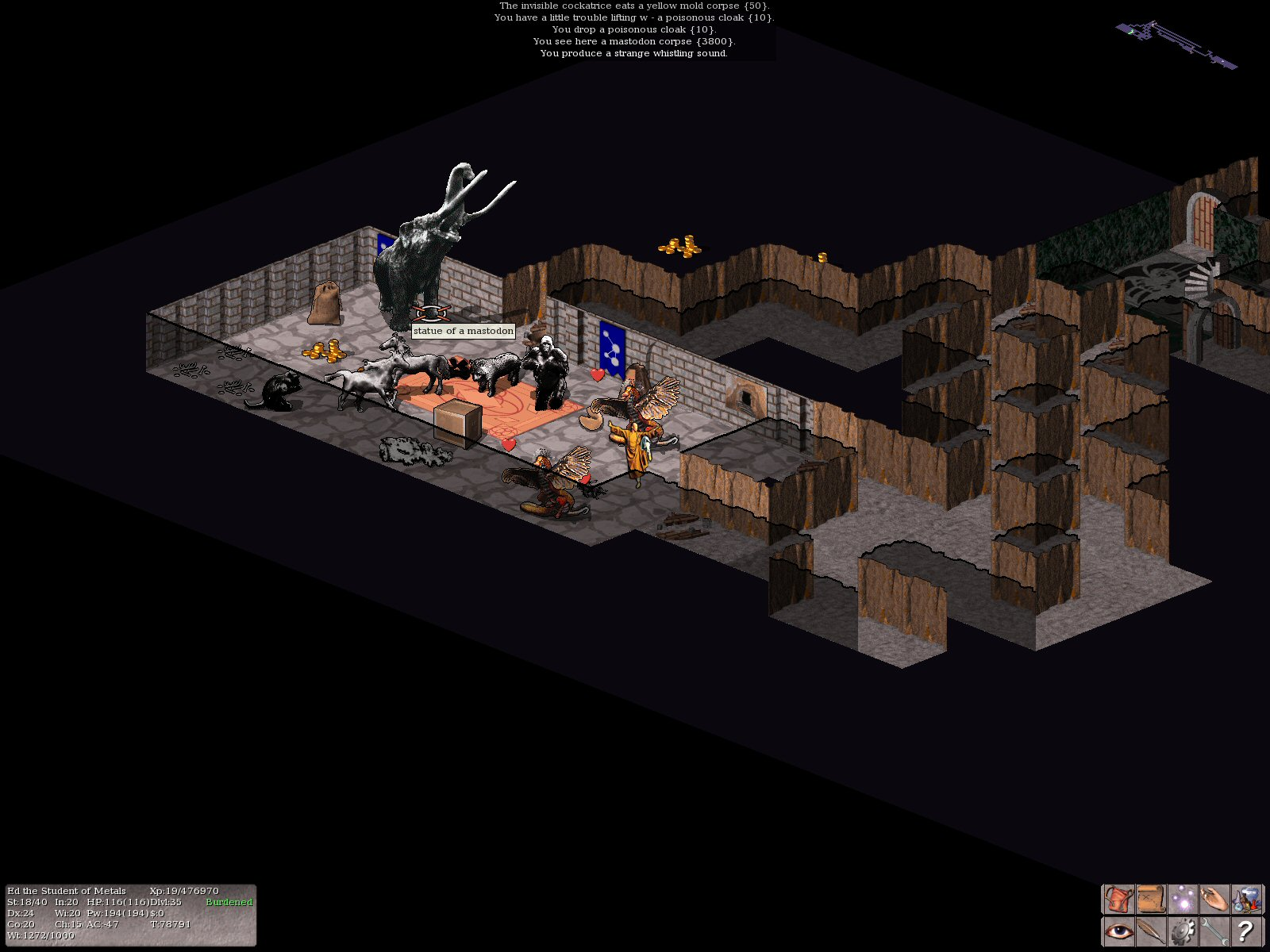
Isometric "Vulture" sprite-based interface for the roguelike game NetHack

What gameplay elements explicitly define a "roguelike" game remains a point of debate within the video game community. There is broad agreement that roguelike games incorporate gameplay elements popularized by the text-based game Rogue (1980), which bore out many variations due to its success; As of 2015, several hundred games claiming to be roguelikes were available through the Steam game catalog, and the user-run wiki RogueBasin tracks hundreds of roguelikes and their development.

Some players and developers sought a more narrow definition for "roguelike" as variations on Rogue introduced new concepts or eschewed other principles that they felt moved the games away from the flavor of what Rogue was. At the International Roguelike Development Conference 2008 held in Berlin, Germany, players and developers established a definition for roguelikes known as the "Berlin Interpretation". The Berlin Interpretation set out a set of high-value and low-value factors, basing these lists on five canon roguelike games: ADOM, Angband, Linley's Dungeon Crawl, NetHack, and Rogue. The Interpretation was designed to determine "how roguelike a game is", noting that missing a factor does not eliminate a game from being a roguelike, nor does possessing the features make a game roguelike. John Harris of Game Set Watch exemplified this by using these criteria to numerically score some seemingly roguelike games; Linley's Dungeon Crawl and NetHack scored highest, earning 57.5 points of 60 available based on the Interpretation, while Toe Jam & Earl and Diablo, games commonly compared to roguelikes, earned only about half of the points.

The Berlin Interpretation defined nine high-value factors:

- The game uses random dungeon generation to increase replayability. Games may include pre-determined levels such as a town level common to the Moria family where the player can buy and sell equipment, but these are considered to reduce the randomness set by the Berlin Interpretation. This "random generation" is nearly always based on some procedural generation approach rather than true randomness. Procedural generation uses a set of rules defined by the game developers to seed the generation of the dungeon generally to assure that each level of the dungeon can be completed by the player without special equipment, and also can generate more aesthetically pleasing levels. In addition, the appearances of magical items may vary from run to run. For example, a "bubbly" potion might heal wounds one game, then poison the player character in the next.
- The game uses permadeath. Once a character dies, the player must begin a new game, known as a "run", which will regenerate the game's levels anew due to procedural generation. A "save game" feature will only provide suspension of gameplay and not a limitlessly recoverable state; the stored session is deleted upon resumption or character death. Players can circumvent this by backing up stored game data ("save scumming"), an act that is usually considered cheating; the developers of Rogue introduced the permadeath feature after introducing a save function, finding that players were repeatedly loading saved games to achieve the best results. According to Rogue's Michael Toy, they saw their approach to permadeath not as a means to make the game painful or difficult but to put weight on every decision the player made as to create a more immersive experience.
- The game is turn-based, giving the player as much time as needed to make a decision. Gameplay is usually step-based, where player actions are performed serially and take a variable measure of in-game time to complete. Game processes (e.g., monster movement and interaction, progressive effects such as poisoning or starvation) advance based on the passage of time dictated by these actions.
- The game is grid-based. Gameplay takes place on a uniform grid of tiles. This is usually presented in an ASCII representation of the dungeon.
- The game is non-modal, in that every action should be available to the player regardless of where they are in the game. The Interpretation notes that shops like in Angband do break this non-modality.
- The game has a degree of complexity due to the number of different game systems in place that allow the player to complete certain goals in multiple ways, creating emergent gameplay. For example, to get through a locked door, the player may attempt to pick the lock, kick it down, burn down the door, or even tunnel around it, depending on their current situation and inventory. A common phrase associated with NetHack is "The Dev Team Thinks of Everything" in that the developers seem to have anticipated every possible combination of actions that a player may attempt to try in their gameplay strategy, such as using gloves to protect one's character while wielding the corpse of a cockatrice as a weapon to petrify enemies by its touch.
- The player must use resource management to survive. Items that help sustain the player, such as food and healing items, are in limited supply, and the player must figure out how to use these most advantageously to survive in the dungeon. USGamer further considers "stamina decay" as another feature related to resource management. The player's character constantly needs to find food to avoid starvation, which prevents the player from exploiting health regeneration by simply either passing turns for a long period of time or fighting very weak monsters at low level dungeons. Rich Carlson, one of the creators of an early roguelike-like Strange Adventures in Infinite Space, called this aspect a sort of "clock", imposing some type of deadline or limitation on how much the player can explore and creating tension in the game.
- The game is focused on hack and slash-based gameplay, where the goal is to kill many monsters, and where other peaceful options do not exist.
- The game requires the player to explore the world, and discover the purpose of unidentified items. In games featuring random generation, this must be done again every playthrough, as both the map and the appearances of items change.

Low-value factors from the Berlin Interpretation are:

- The game is based on controlling only a single character throughout one playthrough.
- Monsters have behavior that is similar to the player-character, such as the ability to pick up items and use them, or cast spells.
- The game aims to provide a tactical challenge that may require players to play through several times to learn the appropriate tactics for survival.
- The game involves exploring dungeons which are made up of rooms and interconnecting corridors. Some games may have open areas or natural features, such as rivers, though these are considered against the Berlin Interpretation.
- The game presents the status of the player and the game through numbers on the game's screen/interface.

Though this is not addressed by the Berlin Interpretation, roguelikes are generally single-player games. On multi-user systems, leaderboards are often shared between players. Some roguelikes allow traces of former player characters to appear in later game sessions in the form of ghosts or grave markings. Some games such as NetHack even have the player's former characters reappear as enemies within the dungeon. Multi-player turn-based derivatives such as TomeNET, MAngband, and Crossfire do exist and are playable online.

=== Early roguelikes ===
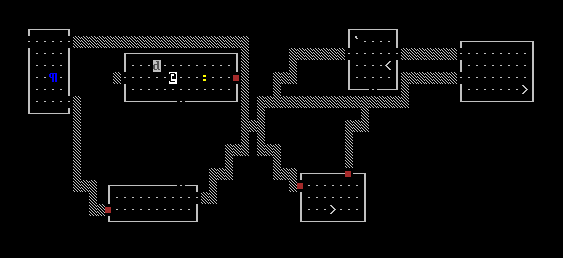
A level in NetHack in ASCII mode

Early roguelikes were developed to be played on text-based user interfaces, commonly UNIX-based computer mainframes and terminals used at colleges and universities before transitioning to personal computers. Games used a mix of ASCII or ANSI characters to visually represent elements of the dungeon levels, creatures, and items on the level as in ASCII art. These games typically included one or two text lines presenting the player's current status at the bottom of the screen, and text-based menu screens to manage inventory, statistics, and other details.

The player's character was nearly always represented by the @ character across text-based roguelikes, which had been chosen by the developers of Rogue to stand for "where you're at". Other common examples would include $ for monetary treasure and D for a dragon. Later games would take advantage of colour-based text graphics to increase the variation of creature types, such as a red D for a red dragon that would shoot fire, while a green D could indicate a green dragon that would shoot acid. Players would use the keyboard, using one keypress to enter a command. Sociologist Mark R. Johnson described these commonality of symbols and glyphs as semiotic codes that gave an "aesthetic construction of nostalgia" by "depicting textual symbols as aesthetic forms in their own right" and consistency across multiple roguelikes.

With modern computer systems, users developed alternate means of displaying the game, such as graphical tilesets and Isometric-based graphical front ends, as well as interfaces that took advantage of keyboard and mouse UI controls, but otherwise still kept to the core tile-based gameplay.

As computers offered more advanced user interfaces, such as windows and point-and-click menus, many traditional roguelikes were modified to include support for having multiple windows. This was useful to not only show the character-based dungeon, but details on the character's inventory, the monster they were in battle with, and other status messages, in separate windows. Having access to multiple windows also allowed having menus to complete more complex commands. More recent examples of roguelikes that have stayed with ASCII art-based displays include Cogmind (2017) and Cataclysm: Dark Days Ahead (2013).

=== Roguelites and procedural death labyrinths ===
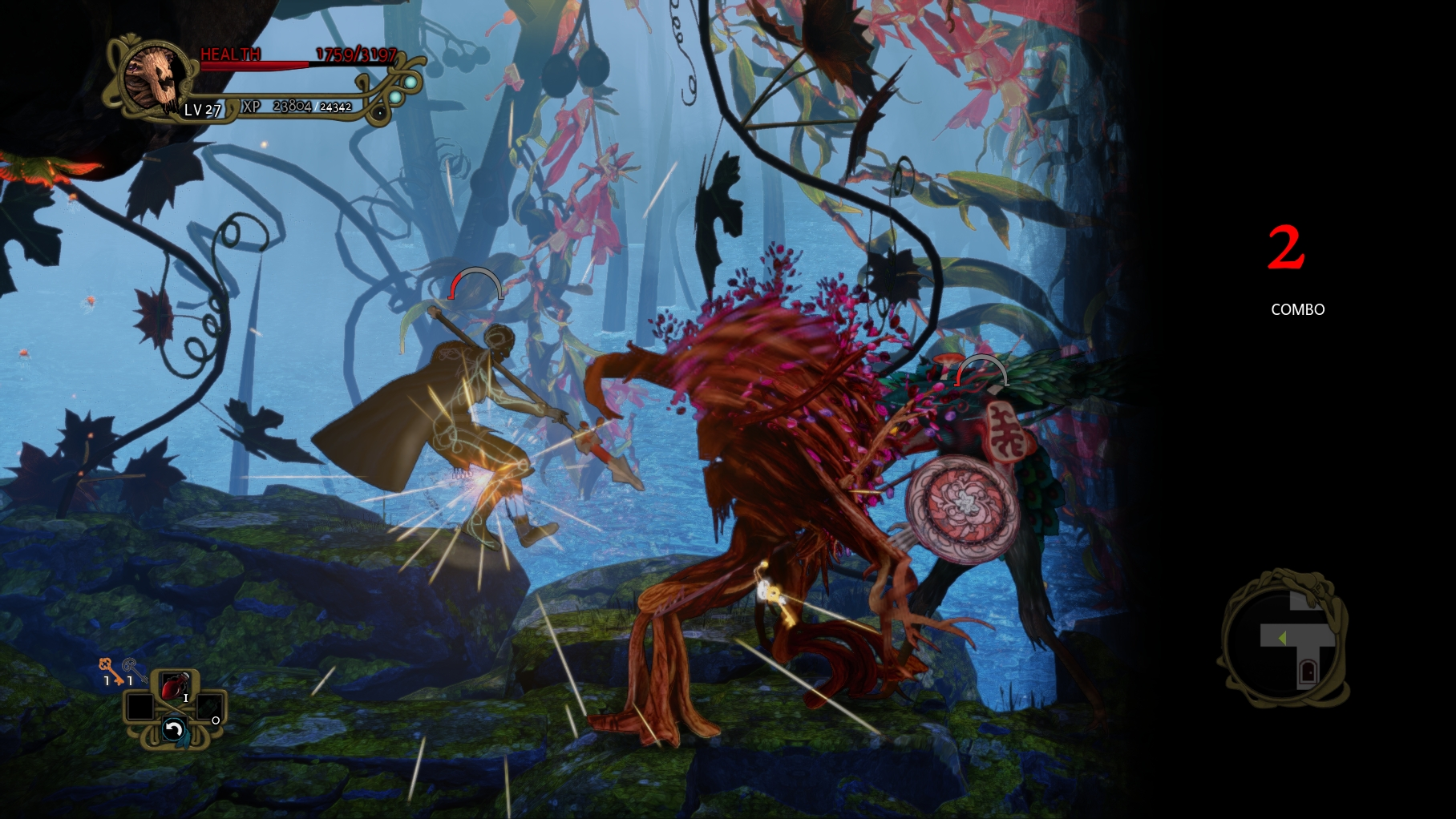
Abyss Odyssey combines roguelike elements with beat 'em up gameplay.

With computers and video game consoles capable of more advanced graphics and gameplay, numerous games have emerged that are loosely based on the classic roguelike design but diverge in one or more features. Many of these games use the concepts of procedurally generated maps and permadeath, while moving away from tile-based movement and turn-based gameplay, often using another gameplay genre such as action games or platformers. Other titles deriving from roguelike games are based on the observation that the traditional roguelikes are difficult with a steep learning curve, and a player may never complete these games over numerous play sessions, making these titles difficult to sell to a broader audience. These new games would include elements to reduce the difficulty as to draw in a larger audience.

Many games with some of the Berlin Interpretation elements call themselves "roguelike", but bear little resemblance to the original Rogue, causing confusion and dilution of the term. Some players of the Berlin Interpretation roguelikes disliked the dilution of the term, believing that in the 1990s and 2000s, the term "roguelikes" served well to distinguish games that forwent aesthetics to focus on depth of gameplay from games more comparable to interactive movies, particularly games that incorporated real-time gameplay elements which tended to reduce the game's complexity. As such, the term "rogue-lite" or "roguelike-like" has been used by some to distinguish these games that possess some, but not all, of the Berlin Interpretation features from those that exactly meet the Berlin roguelike definition. The phrase "procedural death labyrinth" has also been applied to such games, as they retain the notion of permadeath and random level generation but lack the other high-value factors normally associated with roguelike games.

Rogue-lites favor short gameplay runs with victory conditions, in contrast to some traditional roguelikes that can be played indefinitely. The shortness of a single gameplay run in rogue-lites can motivate players to continually replay the game in the hope of reaching completion, making replayability a high-value factor in these types of games. Game journalist Joshua Bycer observed that several games considered as rogue-lites feature fixed events, even if the means to reach that may be through procedural generation, whereas a roguelike game typically lacks this level of predictability. For example, several rogue-lites require the player to travel a fixed number of biomes, each which culminates in a boss fight, such as Rogue Legacy. Associated with their short length, many rogue-lites feature a metagame, whereby achieving certain goals will unlock persistent features such as the ability to select a new character at the start of the game or the addition of new items and monsters in the procedural generation of the game's levels. Alternatively, each run through rogue-lite may be to collect resources which one then advances their character within the metagame, and a player may simply forgo a complete run once they have collected sufficient materials for that advancement.

Roguelikes with short playthrough times often include daily challenges, in which a preset random seed is used to generate the game's levels in a deterministic fashion so that each player will have the same encounters; players attempt to complete the game through those levels or otherwise get the highest score through online leaderboards. Roguelikes may also allow the player to enter the random seed directly as to be able to rechallenge the same set of levels or share a difficult set of levels with other players.

US Gamer further identified games they consider edge cases of being roguelikes, as they are inspired by Rogue, and "that stray a bit further from the genre but still manage to scratch the same itch as a great roguelike". These include games such as the Diablo series, ToeJam & Earl, and Dwarf Fortress, the latter of which retains the classic ASCII art-approach to gameplay as traditional roguelikes. Ars Technica writer Richard C. Moss alternatively suggested that the term "roguelike" is less necessarily about any specific genre definition but instead the idea that "games can be deep, inventive, challenging, and endlessly compelling experiences through their rules and their systems alone".

=== Subgenres within roguelikes ===
In considering the popularity of roguelikes that deviate from the Berlin Interpretation, the rogue-lites, some subgenres have emerged.

Action roguelikes are typically based on combining gameplay of action games within roguelikes rather than turn-based gameplay. Spelunky is an example of combining a platform game with the roguelike formula, while The Binding of Isaac and Enter the Gungeon are roguelike shooter games. Within action roguelikes have also emerged a minimalistic shooter roguelike, with Vampire Survivors as a leading example; in such games, the player generally fights through wave after wave of enemies, their character often fully firing or using all possible attacks without player intervention, with the ability to expand their character through a random selection of power-ups as they defeat more enemies.

Another type of roguelike subgenre is the roguelike deck-builder, in which combat is resolved by using cards or an equivalent object. These games are inspired by physical deck-building games, where the player builds their deck over the course of the game, forcing them to plan strategy on the fly. While the 2014 game Dream Quest is considered the first example of such a video game, the popularity of the genre was cemented with Slay the Spire in 2017.

== History ==
=== Early history (1975–1980) ===
The creation of roguelike games came from hobbyist programmers and computer hackers, attempting to create games for the nascent computer field in the early 1980s, particularly influenced by the 1975 text adventure game Colossal Cave Adventure (often simply titled Adventure, or advent on filesystems without long filenames), and from the high fantasy setting of the tabletop game Dungeons & Dragons. Some elements of the roguelike genre were present in dungeon crawlers written for the PLATO system. This includes pedit5 (1975) believed to be the first dungeon crawl game, and featured random monster encounters, though only used a single fixed dungeon level. pedit5 inspired similar PLATO-based dungeon crawlers dnd (1975), orthanc (1978), Moria (1978), and avatar (1979). It is unclear if these PLATO games inspired the roguelike genre as there is no evidence that the early roguelike creators had access to these games. The core roguelike games were developed independently of each other, many of the developers not learning about their respective projects until several years after the genre took off.

Roguelike games were initially developed for computing environments with limited memory, including shared mainframe systems and early home computers; this limitation prevented developers from retaining all but a few dungeon levels in memory while the game was running, leading to procedural generation to avoid the memory storage issue. Procedural generation led to high replayability, as no two games were alike.

==== Concurrent variants ====
Though the term "roguelike" derives from the 1980 game Rogue, the first known game with the core roguelike gameplay elements was Beneath Apple Manor (1978), written by Don Worth for the Apple II; Beneath Apple Manor is also recognized as the first commercial roguelike game. The game, inspired by Worth's enjoyment of Dungeons & Dragons roleplaying, included procedural generation using a modification of the random maze generator from the game Dragon Maze, role-playing elements for the characters, tile-based movement and turn-based combat. Though Beneath Apple Manor predated Rogue, it was not as popular as Rogue: Rogue had advantage of being distributed over ARPANET which many college students had easy access to, while Beneath Apple Manor was packaged and sold by hand by Worth either at local stores or through mail fulfillment.

Another early roguelike whose development pre-dated Rogue was Sword of Fargoal (1982), developed by Jeff McCord starting in 1979. The game was based on GammaQuest, an earlier title McCord had created on the Commodore PET which he shared locally with friends while a student at Henry Clay High School in Kentucky; the game itself was based on a Dungeons & Dragons campaign he had run himself in the prior years. Before graduating and attending the University of Tennessee in 1981, he had started work on GammaQuest II, which required the player to navigate through randomly generated dungeon levels, acquire a sword, and make it back to the surface with that sword through more randomly generated levels. The more advanced computers available at the school, such as the VIC-20, enabled him to expand out the game further from the highly limited memory on the PET. On seeing the prospects of selling computer software, he eventually got a publication deal with Epyx, where they helped him to refine the marketing of the game, renaming it Sword of Fargoal, and giving him access to the more powerful Commodore 64, enabling him to use graphics and sound as part of the game. The game was considered a success, and when it was ported to the PC in 1983, it out-shone Rogue's PC release the same year due to Sword of Fargoal's superior graphics and sound.

==== Rogue ====
Rogue was written by Glenn Wichman and Michael Toy in 1980 while students at the University of California, Santa Cruz. The game was inspired by Toy's prior experience in playing the 1971 Star Trek game and programming clones of it for various other computer systems. It was also inspired by interactive fiction Adventure. While looking for a way to randomize the experience of Adventure, they came across Ken Arnold's curses library that enabled them to better manipulate characters on the terminal screen, prompting Toy and Wichman to create a graphical-like randomized adventure game. They created the story of the game by having the player seek out the "Amulet of Yendor", "Yendor" being "Rodney" spelled backwards, the name of the wizard they envisioned had created the dungeon. Rogue was originally executed on a VAX-11/780 computer; its limited memory forced them to use a simple text-based interface for the game. Toy eventually dropped out of school but got a job at the computing labs at University of California, Berkeley, where he met with Arnold. Arnold helped to optimize the curses code and implement more features into the game.

Rogue proved popular with college students and computer researchers at the time, including Ken Thompson; Dennis Ritchie had joked at the time that Rogue was "the biggest waste of CPU cycles in history". Its popularity led to the game's inclusion on BSD UNIX v4.2 in 1984, though at that time, without its source code. Toy and Arnold had anticipated selling Rogue commercially and were hesitant about releasing it; Toy would go on to meet Jon Lane at Olivetti, and together they would go on to create the company A.I. Design to port the games for various home systems along with publishing support by Epyx, later bringing Wichman back to help.

=== Following evolution (1980–1995) ===
Rogue; 1980	Other Variants
Hack; 1982	Other Variants	Moria; 1983
NetHack; 1987	Other Variants	UMoria; 1988
ADOM; 1994	Angband; 1990	Other Variants
ZAngband; 1994	Other Variants
Tales of Maj'Eyal; 2009

The hierarchy of the major Roguelike games that are known to descend from Rogue. Solid lines represent games developed from the parent's source code, while dotted lines represent games that were inspired by the parent game.

The popularity of Rogue led developers to create their own versions of the game, though their efforts were originally limited by the lack of access to Rogue's source, which was not released until BSD v4.3 in 1986. These developers resorted to building games from scratch similar to Rogue but with features that they wanted to see. These versions would be distributed with source code, and along with the original Rogue source, other developers were able to create software forks of the games, adding in new monsters, items, and gameplay features, creating several dozen variants. This process was aided by switching code to languages with better data typing, including object-oriented and scripting languages, and cleaning up and modularizing the code so that contributors can better follow where changes can be made.

While there are some direct variants of Rogue, such as Brogue, most variants of Rogue could be classified into two branches based on two key games, Moria and Hack, that were developed in the spirit of Rogue.

==== Moria-based ====
Moria (1983) was developed by Robert Alan Koeneke while a student at University of Oklahoma, inspired by both Adventure and Rogue. Having access to a VAX-11/780, but without the source to Rogue due to computer administrator restrictions, he began trying to recreate Rogue but specifically flavored with the complex cave maze of the same name in J.R.R. Tolkien's Middle Earth stories. Following Tolkien's fiction, the player's goal was to descend to the depths of Moria to defeat the Balrog, akin to a boss battle. As with Rogue, levels were not persistent: when the player left the level and then tried to return, a new level would be procedurally generated. Among other improvements to Rogue, Koeneke included a persistent town at the highest level where players could buy and sell equipment, and the use of data structures within the Pascal language allowed him to create a more diverse bestiary within the game. He got help from several playtesters as well as another student, Jimmey Wayne Todd, who helped to program a deeper character generation system. UMoria (short for UNIX Moria) is a close variation on Moria by Jim E. Wilson, making the game more portable to a larger variety of computers while fixing various bugs.

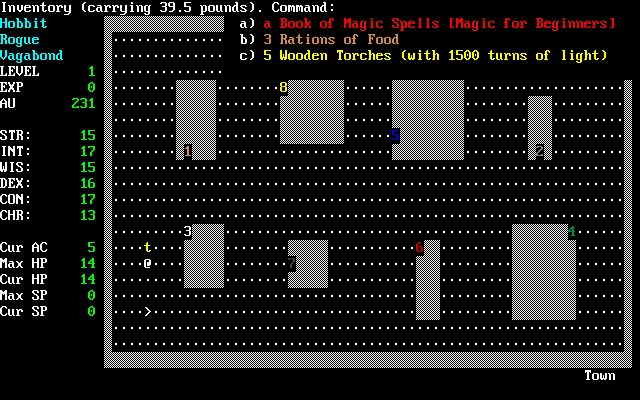
Moria and its descendants—including Angband, which this screenshot is from—incorporated a fixed town level where players could buy and sell equipment.

Angband (1990) was developed by Alex Cutler and Andy Astrand while attending the University of Warwick. Having played UMoria, they wanted to expand the game even further. Working from UMoria's code, they increased the number of levels and monsters, flavored the game based on Angband, the massive fortress controlled by Morgoth from Tolkien's fiction, and incorporated more of the deadlier creatures described within the Middle Earth mythology. They kept the Balrog as a difficult creature that must be overcome at a mid-game level, while Morgoth became the final boss the player must defeat to win the game. Following Cutler and Astrand's graduation, Sean March and Geoff Hill took over the development to see the game through to a public release outside of the university, adding in elements such as giving the player a sense of the rewards and dangers of a level when they entered it the first time.

Once Angband was released to the public via USENET, there were efforts to have code maintainers (the "devteam") to fix bugs, clean up the code and implement suggestions into the code. Due to numerous shifts in those maintaining the code (due to other obligations), and the number of potential user suggestions to include, Angband would become highly forked, leading to a number of Angband variants; at least sixty known variants exist with about a half dozen still under active development. One significant fork was ZAngband (1994) (short for Zelazny Angband), which expanded on Angband and altered the theme towards Roger Zelazny's The Chronicles of Amber. The ZAngband codebase would be used to create Troubles of Middle Earth (ToME) in 2002, which later swapped out the Tolkien and Zelazny fiction setting for a new original one to become Tales of Maj'Eyal (2009). The vanilla Angband remains in development today by the devteam.

==== Hack-based ====
Hack (1982) was developed by Jay Fenlason with help from Kenny Woodland, Mike Thome, and Jonathan Payne, students at Lincoln-Sudbury Regional High School at the time, while participating in the school's computer lab overseen by Brian Harvey. Harvey had been able to acquire a PDP-11/70 minicomputer for the school and instituted a course curriculum that allowed students to do whatever they wanted on the computers, including playing games, as long as they had completed assignments by the end of each semester. Fenlason, Woodland, Thome, and Payne met through these courses and became a close group of friends and competent programmers. Harvey had invited the group to the computer labs at UC Berkeley where they had the opportunity to use the mainframe systems there, and were introduced to Rogue, inspiring them to create their own version as their class project. Fenlason had created a list of features they wanted to improve upon in Rogue such as having a level's layout saved once the player moved off that level. They approached Toy and Arnold at a local USENIX conference for the source code to Rogue, but were refused, forcing them to develop the routines from scratch. The resulting program, Hack, stayed true to the original Dungeons and Dragons influences, and derived its name from being both a "hack and slash" game as well as a programming hack to recreate Rogue without having access to its source code. Fenlason was not able to include all the desired features, and his involvement in Hack's development concluded after the students had left the school. Fenlason had provided the source code to Hack to the USENIX conferences to be distributed on their digital tapes, from which it was later discovered and built upon through USENET newsgroups, porting it to various systems. Like Angband, the maintainership of the Hack code passed through several hands, and some variants were created by different forks.

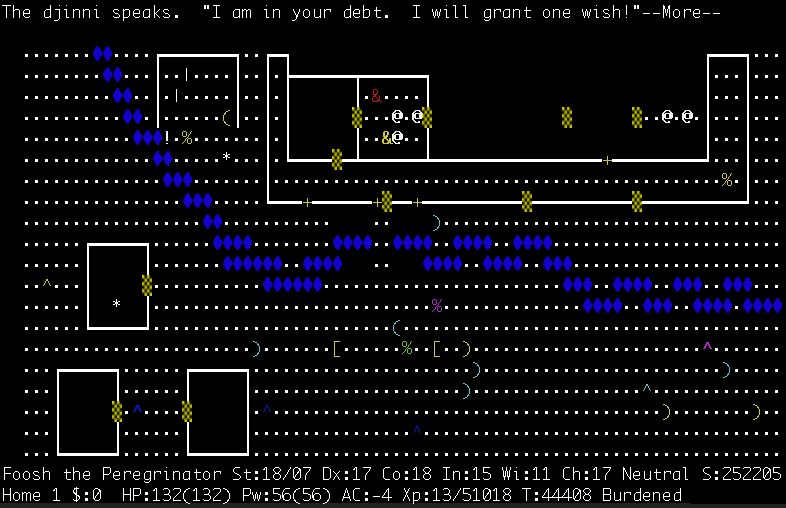
An example of a fixed level from NetHack, showing a town-like area (with buildings indicated by the line symbols) with a river passing through it (the blue tiles)

Hack would eventually be dropped in favor of NetHack (1987). When Mike Stephenson, an analyst at a computer hardware manufacturer, took maintainership of Hack's code, he improved it, taking suggestions from Izchak Miller, a philosophy professor at University of Pennsylvania, and Janet Walz, another computer hacker. Calling themselves the DevTeam, they began to make major modifications to Hack's code. They named their new version NetHack, in part due to their collaboration over the game being done through USENET. NetHack's major deviations from Hack were the introduction of a wider variety of monsters, borrowing from other mythologies and lores, including anachronistic and contemporary cultural elements (such as a tourist class with a flash-bulb camera inspired by Terry Pratchett's Discworld series) in the high fantasy setting, and the use of pre-defined levels with some procedural elements that the player would encounter deeper in the dungeons. Further iterations of the game included branching pathways through the dungeon and optional character-based quests that could grant the player an extremely useful item to complete the game. Though the DevTeam released the code publicly, they carefully maintained who could contribute to the code base to avoid excessive forking of the vanilla game, and remain relatively quiet about suggested improvements to each release, working in relatively secrecy from its player base.

Ancient Domains of Mystery (1994), or ADOM for short, derived from concepts presented in NetHack. ADOM was originally developed by Thomas Biskup while a student at Technical University of Dortmund. After playing through Rogue and Hack, he came to NetHack and was inspired by the game but dismayed at the complexity and elements he found unnecessary or distracting. Biskup created ADOM from scratch with the aim of creating a more story-driven game than NetHack that kept the depth of gameplay with a focused theme and setting. The resulting game featured several different dungeons, many generated procedurally, connected through an overworld map of the fictional realm of Ancardia, and would have the player complete various quests in those dungeons to progress the game. A major feature was the influence of Chaos forces through unsealed portals, which the player would have to close. While in areas affected by Chaos, the player's character would become tainted, causing mutations that could be either detrimental or beneficial. ADOM, like NetHack and Angband, would gain a devteam to maintain the code and implement updates and patches to avoid excessive forking.

==== Other variants ====
Not all early roguelikes were readily classified as Hack or Moria descendants. Larn (1986), developed by Noah Morgan, borrowed concepts from both Hack (in that there are persistent and fixed levels) and Moria (in the availability of a shop level and general difficulty increasing with dungeon level), but while these two games have spiraled in size to take multiple play sessions to complete, Larn was aimed to be completed in a single session. Larn also uses a fixed-time feature, in that the player had only so many turns to complete a goal, though there were ways to jump back in time as to extend play. Omega, developed by Laurence Brothers in the late 1980s, is credited with introducing an overworld concept to the roguelike genre, prior to the feature's appearance in ADOM. Omega was often remembered for its odd inventory approach in which the player would have to pick up an object, considering it being held, and then moving that object to a bag or an equipment slot. Linley's Dungeon Crawl (1995) was created by Linley Henzell and featured a skill-based character progression system, in which experience points could be used to improve specific skills, such as weapon proficiency or trap detection. One fork of this would form the basis for Dungeon Crawl Stone Soup (2006). SSI's Dungeon Hack (1993) offered randomized dungeons and permadeath within AD&D 2nd Edition rules.

=== Mystery Dungeon games (1993–onward) ===
Through 1993, roguelikes primarily existed in computer space, and no home console variants had yet existed. Two of the earliest-known attempts were Sega's Fatal Labyrinth (1990) and Dragon Crystal (1990), but which lacked the depth of a typical computer-based roguelike. Neither proved to be successful games. There was also the 1991 Japanese exclusive Game Boy game Cave Noire from Konami, that centred on four distinct roguelike questlines divided into ten difficulty levels.

Chunsoft had gained success by developing the Dragon Quest series, a series which established fundamental aspects of the computer role-playing game genre, popular for Western computer audiences, into a more streamlined approach better suited for Japanese players that preferred consoles. With roguelikes starting to gain popularity, Chunsoft's developers believed they could do a similar treatment for that genre to make it better suited for Japanese audiences. Chunsoft's Koichi Nakamura stated their intent was to take Rogue and make it "more understandable, more easy-to-play version" of the title that could be played on consoles. This led to the creation of the Mystery Dungeon, with the first title being Torneko no Daibōken: Fushigi no Dungeon (トルネコの大冒険 不思議のダンジョン, Torneko's Great Adventure: Mystery Dungeon) (1993) based on the Dragon Quest series. Several changes to the roguelike formula had to be made for this conversion: they had developed ways to reduce the difficulty of the roguelike by using progressively more difficult dungeons that were randomly generated, and made permadeath an option by selection of difficulty level. An added benefit for Torneko no Daibōken was that it used the established Dragon Quest 4 setting and the character Torneko, helping to make the game familiar to its planned audience and giving a story for the player to follow. While Torneko no Daibōken did not sell as well as typical Dragon Quest games, it was successful enough for Chunsoft to develop a second title based on a wholly original character and setting, Mystery Dungeon: Shiren the Wanderer, released in 1995. Chunsoft found that they were more creative with how they developed the game without the need to respect an existing property. Since then, Chunsoft has developed over 25 games in the Mystery Dungeon series for various platforms, In addition to their Shiren titles, many of the other Chunsoft Mystery Dungeon games span various franchises, including Chocobo series based on Final Fantasy, Pokémon Mystery Dungeon based on Pokémon, and a crossover with Atlus' Etrian Odyssey in Etrian Mystery Dungeon. Several titles in the Mystery Dungeon series were popular, and would become a staple of the Japanese video game market.

A primary difference between the Mystery Dungeon games and Western roguelikes following the Berlin Interpretation is the lack of permadeath—in Mystery Dungeon games, player-characters may die or become too injured, resetting their progress to the start of the dungeon, but the games typically provide means to store and recover equipment and other items from the previous run. The Mystery Dungeon games were not as successful in Western markets when published there, as the target players—younger players who likely had not experienced games like Rogue—found the lack of a traditional role-playing game save system odd.

Other Japanese role-playing games would incorporate random dungeon generation as part of their design, mimicking part of the nature of roguelikes, and were considered roguelike titles when published in Western markets. Such titles include Azure Dreams, Dark Cloud, Shining Soul, and Baroque. The massively multiplayer online role-playing game Final Fantasy XIV added a randomly generated Deep Dungeon that was inspired by the procedural generation of roguelikes.

=== Continued development in Western markets (2002–onward) ===
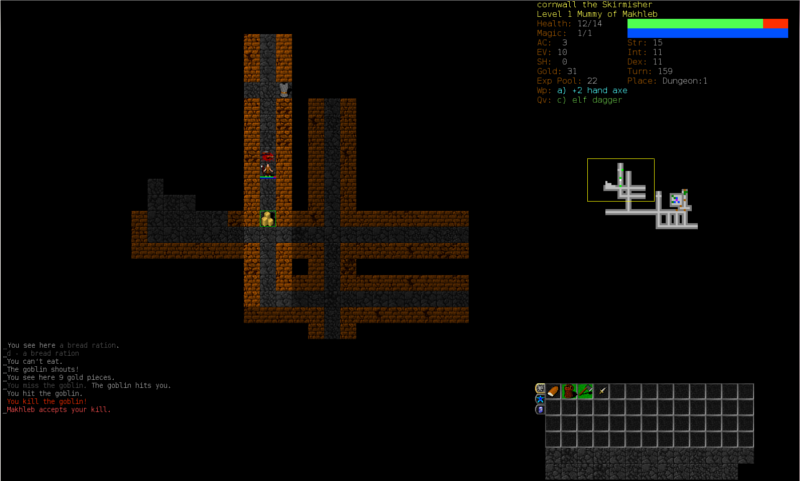
A screenshot of Dungeon Crawl Stone Soup, incorporating user interface elements more common to other hack-and-slash games such as a mini-map and a persistent inventory window

Though new classical roguelike variants would continue to be developed within the Western market, the genre languished as more advanced personal computers capable of improved graphics capabilities and games that utilized these features became popular. However, some of these new graphical games drew influence for roguelike concepts, notably action role-playing games like Blizzard Entertainment's Diablo (1996). Diablo's creator, David Brevik, acknowledged that games like Rogue, NetHack, Telengard and other roguelikes influenced the design of Diablo, including the nature of randomly generated dungeons and loot.

Existing roguelikes continue to be developed: a sequel to ADOM successfully received crowd funding in 2012, while NetHack's first major release in ten years in 2015 is set to help the DevTeam expand the game further. New roguelikes that adhere to core Berlin Interpretation rules are still being created, including Dungeon Crawl Stone Soup (2006), Dungeons of Dredmor (2011), and Dragon Fin Soup (2015). A subclass of "coffeebreak roguelikes" that could be completed in a short period of time have developed, often derived from entries in the Seven Day Roguelike Challenge; examples include such as DoomRL (2013) and Desktop Dungeons (2013) Some games would also take advantage of the ease of developing in the tile-based ASCII interfaces common to roguelikes. For example, the highly popular Dwarf Fortress (2006) uses the roguelike interface atop a construction and management simulation, and would serve as a major inspiration for Minecraft, while SanctuaryRPG (2014) is a more traditional turn-based role-playing game featuring a scripted story that uses an ASCII interface and roguelike gameplay elements. UnReal World (1992), the game that is considered to be the forerunner of the survival game genre, and which frequently uses procedural generation to create the worlds that players must survive in, was developed by Sami Maaranen and was influenced by roguelikes, with its initial interface being similar to that of NetHack.

=== Growth of the roguelite (2005–onward) ===
The roguelike genre saw a resurgence in Western markets after 2000 through independent developers who created a new subgenre designated "roguelite", though the games are also sometimes called "roguelike-likes". Indie developers began to incorporate roguelike elements into genres not normally associated with roguelikes, creating games that would form the basis of this new subgenre. Two examples are Strange Adventures in Infinite Space (2002) and its sequel Weird Worlds: Return to Infinite Space (2005) by Digital Eel, both space exploration games that included randomly generated planets and encounters, and permadeath. Digital Eel based their work on the space exploration game Starflight along with roguelikes like NetHack but wanted to provide a shorter experience that would be easier to replay, akin to tabletop beer and pretzels games like Deathmaze and The Sorcerer's Cave that has elements in common with roguelikes.

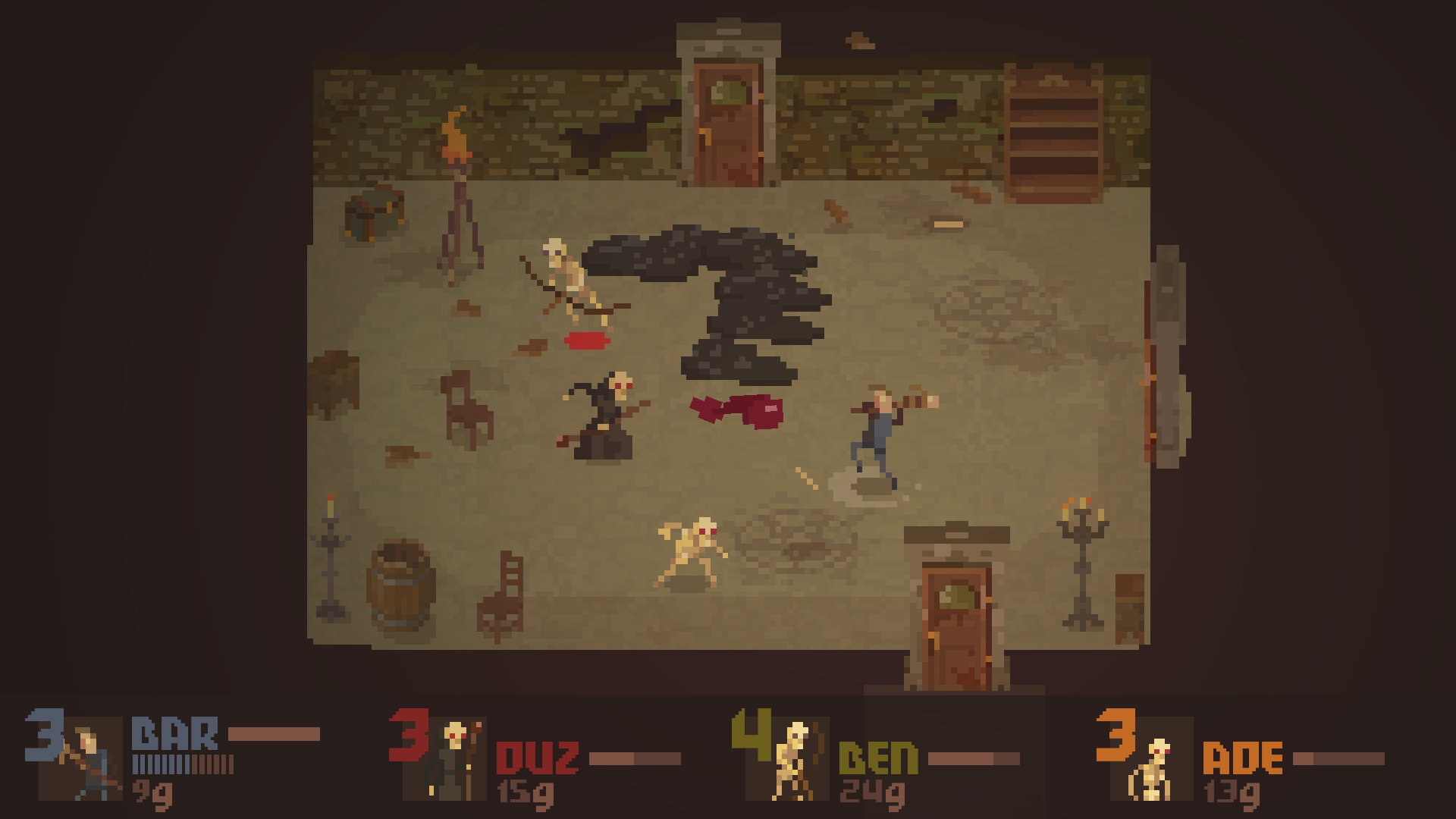
Crawl (2014) is a multiplayer, brawler-based rogue-lite that has up to four players playing in a mixed cooperative/competitive gameplay to explore procedurally generated dungeons.

Spelunky (2008), released shortly after the formation of the Berlin Interpretation, is considered to be a major contribution to the growth of indie-developed roguelikes. Spelunky was developed by Derek Yu, who wanted to take the deep gameplay that is offered by roguelikes and combine it with the ease and pick-up-and-play of a platformer. The result was a platform game incorporating the notion of permadeath in which the player takes an explorer character through randomly generated caves. The intent was to create "deep" gameplay in which the game could be replayed over and over again, with the randomly generated situations driving the need for the player to develop novel, emergent strategies on the fly. Developer Jason Rohrer stated that Spelunky "totally revamped my thinking about single-player videogame design". Edmund McMillen, the developer of The Binding of Isaac (2011), and Kenny and Teddy Lee, the co-developers of Rogue Legacy (2012), credit Yu's approach with Spelunky as showing how to distill down the nature of a traditional roguelike to apply it to other gaming genres which they had done for their roguelikes. Jay Ma and Matthew Davis, the co-developers of FTL: Faster Than Light (2012), credited both Weird Worlds: Return to Infinite Space and Spelunky as part of their influence for FTL. All of these games earned critical praise, and their success has led to a more modern resurgence in roguelikes since their release.

The newfound success in roguelikes is considered part of a larger trend in those that play both board and computer games, looking for "rich play experiences", as described by 100 Rogues developer Keith Burgun, that more popular titles may not always offer. David Bamguart of Gaslamp Games stated that there is a thrill of the risk inherent in roguelikes with random generation and permadeath, helping the player become more invested in the fate of their player character: "The deadly precariousness inherent to the unknown environments of roguelikes gives that investment a great deal of meaning." Additionally, many of these newer roguelikes strive to address the apparent high difficulty and ruthlessness that traditional roguelikes were known for, and newer players will be able to find more help through user-generated game guides and walkthroughs made possible through wide Internet accessibility. Fabien Fischer offers that players have taken to independently developed roguelites as they have tired from "superficial gameplay, whitewashing spectacle, the content craze, and Skinner Box design" in titles produced by AAA developers and publishers.

McMillen of The Binding of Isaac said that including roguelike elements into other game mechanics can be difficult due to the complex interfaces roguelikes tend to have, but eventually "it becomes an increasingly beautiful, deep, and everlasting design that allows you to generate a seemingly dynamic experience for players, so that each time they play your game they're getting a totally new adventure". Procedural-generated world lets developers create many hours worth of game content without spending resources on designing detailed worlds.

Examples of successful games that have integrated roguelike components into other genres include:

- Dead Cells, a roguelike incorporated with Metroidvania-style of platform games
- Slay the Spire, bringing roguelike progression to a deck building game
- Crypt of the Necrodancer which uses a rhythm game-style approach in a roguelike dungeon
- Enter the Gungeon which establishes roguelike progression in a shoot 'em up
- Vampire Survivors, a minimalistic roguelike shoot 'em up.
- Balatro, a score attack style roguelike based on playing poker hands.
- Blue Prince, a roguelike with several puzzle game features as to solve a mystery.

Hades, a roguelike action role-playing game, was built to strongly incorporate elements of non-linear narrative into the game, giving the reason for the player to continually delve into replaying the game, and helped to draw in players to the roguelike genre that otherwise had been put off by its high difficulty level before.

== Community ==
The roguelike genre has developed with the expansion of both classical roguelikes and rogue-lite titles, a dedicated fan community has come about to not only discuss games within it but to craft their own tales of near-death adventures or amusing stories in roguelikes. Within this community, there is strong interest in developing roguelikes. The 7 Day Roguelike challenge (7DRL) was born out of a USENET newsgroup in 2005 for roguelike developers, informally challenging them to create the core of a novel roguelike within 7 days to be submitted for judging and play by the public. The competition has continued annually each year, since growing from 5–6 entries in 2005 to over 130 in 2014. In the spirit of the 2008 International Roguelike Conference, the "Roguelike Celebration" was held for the first time in September 2016 in San Francisco where several past and present roguelike developers gathered to discuss the history and future direction of the genre. It has since been organized again in 2017, 2018 and 2019 in San Francisco, and as virtual events in 2020, 2021, 2022, 2023 and 2024.

== See also ==
- List of roguelikes
- Multi-user dungeon (MUD)
- Random dungeon
- Roguelike deck-building game
