= Brogue (video game) =

Roguelike video game

- Title screen
- Designer: Brian Walker
- Platforms: Windows, OS X, Linux
- Genre: Roguelike
- Mode: Single-player

ASCII graphics are used in Brogue.

Brogue is a free and open-source roguelike computer video game created by Brian Walker. As in its predecessor Rogue, the objective is for the player (represented by the character @) to descend to the 26th floor of the Dungeons of Doom, retrieve the Amulet of Yendor, and return to the surface. The player also has the option of delving deeper into the dungeon to seek lumenstones and achieve a higher score. This task is complicated by the presence of monsters and traps in a procedurally generated dungeon.

Development started in 2009, with the latest version, 1.7.5, being released on September 25, 2018. Brogue's interface, design and graphics have been praised for their simplicity and beauty.

Further development of Brogue has taken place via GitHub under the GNU Affero General Public License v3.0, now named Brogue Community Edition or Brogue CE, with multiple contributors. As of April 2026, the latest version of Brogue CE is 1.15.1, released on February 21.

== Reception ==
IndieGames.com's Cassandra Khaw called Brogue "beautiful and accessible". PC Gamer's Graham Smith compared it with The Binding of Isaac, Dungeons of Dredmor and Spelunky, saying "if you want to start swimming to the deeper end of the pool [of roguelikes], Brogue is your waterwings". Rock Paper Shotgun's Graham Smith ranked the interface with Papers, Please, Democracy 3 and Elite: Dangerous, citing "using old-fashioned ASCII [...] with a set of effects that make the world colourful and alive".
