= Angband (video game) =

1990 video game

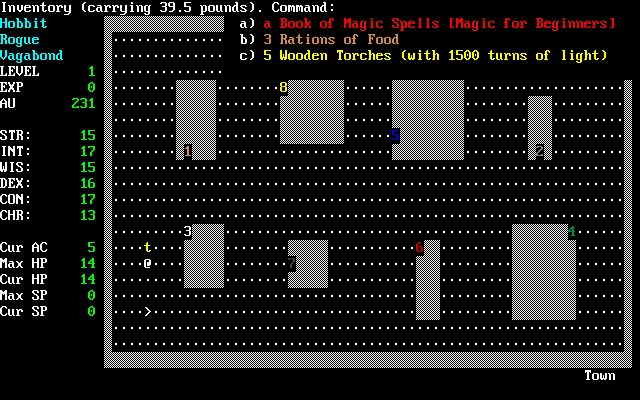
- Developer: Angband Development Team
- Platforms: Unix-like, Windows, Mac OS
- Release: Initial; 11 April 1993; 33 years ago Stable; 4.2.6 / 15 December 2025; 10 months ago
- Genre: Roguelike
- Modes: Single-player, multiplayer

Angband is a dungeon-crawling roguelike video game derived from Umoria. It is based on the writings of J. R. R. Tolkien, in which Angband is the fortress of Morgoth. The current version of Angband is available for all major operating systems, including Unix, Windows, Mac OS X, and Android. It is identified as one of the "major roguelikes" by John Harris. Angband is a free and open source game under the GNU GPLv2 or the angband license.

== Gameplay ==
The goal of Angband is to survive 100 floor levels of the fortress Angband in order to defeat Morgoth. The game is reputed to be extremely difficult.

The player begins in a town where they can buy equipment before beginning the descent. Once in the maze-like fortress, the player encounters traps, monsters, equipment, and hidden doors. With the help of found objects and enchantments, the player's attack and defense power increases, and can even neutralise specific attacks. The player also meets characters and finds artifacts from Tolkien's legendarium.

Angband gameplay emphasises combat and careful resource management. The player has a certain amount of health points. Although Angband records the player's progress to a save file, it does not allow one to resume a saved game in which the player character has already been beaten. The levels are procedurally generated, allowing for a unique game in every play.

== Development ==
The first version of Angband was created by Alex Cutler and Andy Astrand at the University of Warwick in 1990. They wanted to expand the game Umoria by adding items, monsters, and features. After Cutler and Astrand, the source code was maintained at the University of Warwick by Geoff Hill and Sean Marsh. They finally released the game to the public with the version named "2.4.frog_knows" on 11 April 1993. The game, which was previously confined to the University of Warwick, was then enhanced by others and widely ported to non-Unix platforms.

Following their departure, the later principals of Angband have included Charles Swiger, Ben Harrison, and Robert Rühlmann. Harrison was the maintainer responsible for the "Great Code Cleanup", modularizing, extending, and greatly improving the readability of the Angband source code. This in turn led to the large number of variants currently available, as well as the rather large number of ports. Like other maintainers, he eventually moved on to other interests, passing the title to Robert Rühlmann in 2000.

Rühlmann's contributions included releasing version 3.0, which included many monster and object changes contributed by Jonathan Ellis. He also introduced Lua, a lightweight scripting language, with the intention of simplifying development of both the main game and its variants. The Angband community, however, did not generally embrace the addition of scripting, with many expressing confusion over its usage, and was therefore later removed.

The original Moria/Angband software license (Note: The "Angband licence": This software may be copied and distributed for educational, research, and not for profit purposes provided that this copyright and statement are included in all such copies. Other copyrights may also apply.) allowed distribution of the game, but only does so if "not for profit", which precludes packaging with many Linux distributions or inclusion within a magazine cover disc. The license also does not explicitly allow code modification, something which is in practice ignored by the Angband community. In light of these perceived issues, an initiative to re-license Angband was therefore started by maintainer Rühlmann in 2000. This "Angband Open Source Initiative" was designed to make Angband proper Open source under the GPL license. The process was completed on 9 January 2009.

Rühlmann stepped down in October 2005, leading to a brief period of uncertainty. Julian Lighton was later announced as the new maintainer in March 2006, but did not release a new version of the game. Due to the absence of Lighton, Andi Sidwell assumed maintainership, with the support of the community, in December 2007. Under their watch, other developers have come on board and the game has seen significant gameplay and internal code changes. Maintainership passed over to Nick McConnell, starting from version 4.0.0 (2015). backwardsEric took over as maintainer with the release of version 4.2.6 (2025).

== Community ==
Some loci of Angband discussion are the Usenet newsgroup rec.games.roguelike.angband, the Angband Forum website, and the IRC channels #angband (on WorldIRC) and #angband-dev (on Freenode). Some players continue to play Angband for several years.

== Derivative works ==
Among Angband's many derivatives are MAngband (1997), a multiplayer variant; Zangband ("Zelazny"+"Angband") (1994), which incorporates elements of Roger Zelazny's The Chronicles of Amber novels; and Tales of Middle Earth (1998), a Tolkien-themed game developed from the ZAngband code base. Tales of Middle Earth's source code and story were later rewritten, and the game became Tales of Maj'Eyal (2012).

== Legacy ==
David Brevik cited Angband's randomized levels and items as a "huge influence" on Diablo and "the model of what we wanted".

Ernest Cline's novel Ready Player Two features the dungeon from Angband and "Morgoth's crown" as the location of one of the Seven Shards that the protagonists must collect.

== See also ==
- List of roguelikes
- List of open-source video games
