= Katsuki =

Katsuki (written: 香月 or 勝生) is a Japanese surname. Notable people with the surname include:

- Kiyoshi Katsuki (香月 清司; 1881–1950), Japanese general
- Masako Katsuki (勝生 真沙子), Japanese voice actress
- Ryoji Katsuki (香月 良仁; born 1984), Japanese baseball player
- Ryota Katsuki (香月 良太; born 1982), Japanese baseball player

Katsuki (written: 勝己, 勝記, 克己, 克紀, 克貴 or 克樹) is also a masculine Japanese given name. Notable people with the name include:

- Katsuki Akagawa (赤川 克紀; born 1990), Japanese baseball player
- Katsuki Hagiwara (萩原 克己; born 1949), Japanese music critic
- Katsuki Ishihara (石原 勝記; born 1939), Japanese swimmer
- Katsuki Matayoshi (又吉 克樹; born 1990), Japanese baseball player
- Katsuki Yamazaki (山崎 勝己; born 1982), Japanese baseball player

Fictional characters:

- Tsubasa Katsuki (勝木 翼), a character in the manga series Comic Girls
- Yuri Katsuki (勝生 勇利), protagonist of the anime series Yuri on Ice
- Katsuki Bakugo (爆豪 勝己), a character in the manga series My Hero Academia
