= Junko Ohashi =

Japanese singer (1950–2023)

Junko Ohashi 大橋 純子

Background information
- Born: April 26, 1950; Yūbari, Hokkaido, Japan
- Died: November 9, 2023 (aged 73) Tokyo, Japan
- Genres: City pop; kayōkyoku; J-pop; soul; rhythm and blues
- Occupation: Singer
- Years active: 1974–2023
- Labels: Philips Records; Epic Records Japan; VAP
- Website: www.junko-ohashi.com
- Education: Fuji Women's Junior College
- Spouse: Ken Sato (m. 1979)

Japanese name
- Kanji: 大橋 純子
- Hiragana: おおはし じゅんこ
- Katakana: オオハシ ジュンコ
Transcriptions
- Romanization: Ōhashi Junko

Junko Ohashi (大橋 純子, Ōhashi Junko; April 26, 1950 – November 9, 2023) was a Japanese singer best known for her songs "Silhouette Romance" (1981) and "Tasogare My Love" (1978). She was known for her "overwhelming singing ability" and was mainly successful between late 1970s and early 1980s. Her discography consists of more than 20 albums. After a brief hiatus due to battling esophageal and breast cancers, she returned to music in 2019. On November 9, 2023, Ohashi died in Tokyo at the age of 73.

== Early life and education ==
Ohashi was born in Yūbari, Hokkaido, Japan on April 26, 1950, the oldest of four children from a family that ran a restaurant. She graduated from Hokkaido Yubari High School, later attending and graduating from Fuji Women's Junior College. While at college, she joined a band.

== Career ==
Ohashi made her debut as a singer with the album Feeling Now (1974). She had her breakout in 1978, with the hit "Tasogare My Love", the theme song of the TBS drama series Shishi no Gotoku. During her initial stages of her career, she was known to sing hard rock, but switched to soul after being inspired by artists Sérgio Mendes and Janis Joplin. She accompanied Kiyohiko Ozaki on a live tour, and later served as a supporting act.

In 1976, she released the song "Paper Moon", which became a hit. With the success of the album of the same name, she formed the band Junko Ohashi & Minoya Central Station. In 1978, she released the song "Tasogare My Love", which won her a Gold Award during the 20th Japan Record Awards. In 1981, she released the song "Silhouette Romance", which ranked at number 7 on the Oricon Singles Chart, was awarded best song at the 24th Japan Record Awards and sold over 500,000 copies. She also participated in several editions of the Kōhaku Uta Gassen competition, starting from 1979.

In 2018, Ohashi announced that she would be on hiatus after her esophageal cancer diagnosis, returning to recording and touring in March 2019.

== Personal life ==
Ohashi met composer Ken Sato while he was working at Yamaha, marrying him in 1979.

== Health problems and death ==
In 2018, Ohashi revealed that she was diagnosed with early-stage esophageal cancer, cancelling tour dates in order to focus on her treatment, but was able to resume touring afterwards. However, in March 2019, Ohashi revealed that she was also suffering from breast cancer.

On March 22, 2023, it was reported that Ohashi had relapsed and stopped touring again due to focusing on treating her esophageal cancer. Eight months later, on November 9, Ohashi died in a hospital in Tokyo at the age of 73. Her funeral was held at Zōjō-ji temple on November 15 after she was cremated.

== Discography ==
=== Albums ===
==== Studio albums ====
List of studio albums
Title	Album details
Feeling Now	Released: June 1974; Label: Philips Records; Format: LP, CD
Paper Moon	Released: May 1976; Label: Philips Records; Format: LP, CD
Rainbow	Released: April 1977; Label: Philips Records; Format: LP, CD
Crystal City	Released: November 1977; Label: Philips Records; Format: LP, CD
Sasanami Yume Shalom (沙浪夢SHALOM)	Released: June 1978; Label: Philips Records; Format: LP, CD
Flush	Released: December 1, 1978; Label: Philips Records; Format: LP, CD
Full House	Released: June 1, 1979; Label: Philips Records; Format: LP, CD
Hot Life	Released: April 1980; Label: Philips Records; Format: LP, CD, cassette
Tea For Tears	Released: May 1981; Label: Philips Records; Format: LP, CD, cassette
Tasogare (黄昏)	Released: August 1982; Label: Philips Records; Format: LP, CD, cassette
Point Zero	Released: September 21, 1983; Label: Philips Records; Format: LP, CD, cassette
Def	Released: January 21, 1988; Label: Epic Records Japan; Format: LP, CD, cassette
Question	Released: November 21, 1988; Label: Epic Records Japan; Format: CD
Pagoda	Released: April 21, 1990; Label: Epic Records Japan; Format: CD
Miscellaneous	Released: February 1, 1993; Label: VAP; Format: CD
Blue Desert	Released: March 1, 1994; Label: VAP; Format: CD
For Tomorrow	Released: October 1, 1995; Label: VAP; Format: CD
Tokyo Daze (東京DAZE)	Released: September 1, 1996; Label: VAP; Format: CD
Time Flies	Released: August 21, 1999; Label: VAP; Format: CD
Quarter	Released: August 22, 2001; Label: VAP; Format: CD
June	Released: June 4, 2003; Label: VAP; Format: CD
Trinta	Released: April 21, 2004; Label: VAP; Format: CD

==== Cover albums ====
List of cover albums
Title	Album details
J'selection Vol.1	Released: November 2, 1994; Label: VAP; Format: CD
J'selection Vol.2	Released: December 1, 1995; Label: VAP; Format: CD
J'selection Vol.3	Released: December 1, 1996; Label: VAP; Format: CD
Terra	Released: July 19, 2007; Label: VAP; Format: CD
Terra 2	Released: June 10, 2009; Label: VAP; Format: CD
Terra 3 – Uta wa toki wo koete (Terra3〜歌は時を越えて〜)	Released: May 22, 2019; Label: VAP; Format: CD

==== Self-cover albums ====
List of cover albums
Title	Album details
Neo History	Released: September 21, 1993; Label: VAP; Format: CD
Live Life	Released: June 18, 2014; Label: VAP; Format: CD

==== Compilation albums ====
List of compilation albums
Title	Album details
Special Friend Album	Released: June 1978; Label: Philips; Format: LP
Tasogare My Love	Released: November 1978; Label: Philips; Format: LP
Motion & Emotions	Released: November 1978; Label: Philips; Format: LP
Minds	Released: June 1982; Label: Philips; Format: LP
Magical	Released: July 1984; Label: Philips; Format: LP
Story (ストーリー)	Released: 25 January 1986; Label: Philips; Format: CD
Ohashi Junko The Best (大橋純子/THE BEST)	Released: 15 August 1989; Label: Philips; Format: CD
Ohashi Junko New Best (大橋純子/NEW BEST)	Released: 26 May 1993; Label: Philips; Format: CD
Ohashi Junko Special 1800 (大橋純子 Special 1800)	Released: 21 November 1996; Label: Mercury Music; Format: CD
The Best Songs of Junko Ohashi	Released: 5 December 1998; Label: VAP; Format: CD
Treasure Collection Ohashi Junko (TREASURE COLLECTION 大橋純子)	Released: 30 June 1998; Label: Mercury Music; Format: CD
Super Value Ohashi Junko (スーパー・バリュー/大橋純子)	Released: 19 December 2001; Label: Kitty Mme; Format: CD
Golden Best Ohashi Junko Singles (ゴールデン☆ベスト 大橋純子 シングルス)	Released: 26 November 2003; Label: Universal Music Japan; Format: CD
Premium Selection Ohashi Junko (プライム・セレクション 大橋純子)	Released: 18 January 2006; Label: Universal Music Japan; Format: CD
Best Hit & Karaoke Ohashi Junko (ベストヒット&カラオケ 大橋純子)	Released: 30 August 2006; Label: Universal Music Japan; Format: CD
Ohashi Junko Best 10 (大橋純子 ベスト10)	Released: 17 January 2007; Label: Universal Music Japan; Format: CD
Ohashi Junko Essential Best (大橋純子 エッセンシャル・ベスト)	Released: 19 December 2007; Label: Universal Music Japan; Format: CD
The Premium Best Ohashi Junko (ザ・プレミアムベスト 大橋純子)	Released: 18 March 2009; Label: Universal Music Japan; Format: CD
Complete Single Best	Released: 10 June 2009; Label: Universal Music Japan; Format: CD
Golden Best Ohashi Junko Sony Music Years (GOLDEN☆BEST 大橋純子 ソニーミュージック・イヤーズ)	Released: 10 June 2009; Label: Sony Music Direct; Format: CD
Light Mellow Ohashi Junko (Light Mellow 大橋純子)	Released: 6 August 2014; Label: Universal Music Japan; Format: CD
Essential Best 1200 Ohashi Junko (エッセンシャル・ベスト 1200 大橋純子)	Released: 21 March 2018; Label: Universal Music Japan; Format: CD

=== Singles ===
Single	Year	Album
"Kagi wa Kaeshite!" (鍵はかえして!)	1974	Feeling Now
"Paper Moon" (ペイパー・ムーン)	1976	Paper Moon (ペイパー・ムーン)
"Catchy no Uwasa" (キャシーの噂)	1976	Paper Moon (ペイパー・ムーン)
"Sakanoue no ie" (坂の上の家)	1976	Non-album single
"Simple Love" (シンプル・ラブ)	1977	Rainbow
"Mr. Smile" (ミスター・スマイル)	1977	Non-album single
"Crystal City" (クリスタル・シティー)	1978	Crystal City (クリスタル・シティー)
"Funky Little Queenie" (ファンキー・リトル・クイニー)	1978	Crystal City (クリスタル・シティー)
"Star-Light Train" (スターライト・トレイン)	1978	Non-album single
"Tasogare My Love" (たそがれマイ・ラブ)	1978	Non-album single
"Safari Night" (サファリ・ナイト)	1978	Flush
"Beautiful Me" (ビューティフル・ミー)	1979	Full House
"Anata ni wa Wakaranai" (あなたにはわからない)	1979	Full House
"Canadian Lullaby" (カナディアン・ララバイ)	1980	Hot Life
"Ooh Boy"	1980	Hot Life
"Moetsukite" (燃えつきて)	1980	Hot Life
"Fantasy Woman" (ファンタジック・ウーマン)	1981	Tea for Tears
"Silhouette Romance" (シルエット・ロマンス)	1981	Non-album single
"Samba Soleil" (サンバ・ソレイユ)	1982	Non-album single
"Tasogare" (黄昏)	1982	Tasogare – Postcard Fantasy (黄昏)
"Lost Love – Ai no Odoriba" (LOST LOVE -愛の踊り場-)	1982	Magical
"Nemurenai Diamond" (眠れないダイヤモンド)	1988	DEF
"Futa Toori no Kokuhaku" (ふたとおりの告白)	1988	DEF
"Anata ni Tsutsumarete" (あなたにつつまれて)	1988	Question
"Ai wa Toki o Koete" (愛は時を越えて)	1992	Non-album single
"Kekkon" (結婚)	1993	Non-album single
"Kekkon no Risō to Genjitsu" (結婚の理想と現実)	1993	Non-album single
"Rain"	1994	Blue Desert
"20-Sai no Koro" (20才の頃)	1995	For Tomorrow
"Kinjirareta Yume no Naka de" (禁じられた夢の中で)	1996	Tokyo Daze (東京DAZE)
"Melody" (メロディ)	1999	Non-album single
"Hohoemu Tame no Yuuki" (微笑むための勇気)	2002	Non-album single
"Zankyō" (残響)	2005	Non-album single
"Otona no Koi wo Shimasho" (大人の恋をしましょう)	2010	Non-album single
