= Katsuki Hagiwara =

Katsuki Hagiwara (Japanese: 萩原 克己) (born 1949) was a Japanese music critic and representative managing director of Elec Records, a Japanese media corporation re-established in November 2004. He was born in Yokohama, Kanagawa.

== History ==
He performed at the 1968 Nationwide Yamaha Light Music Contest, aged 19, as drummer of the band MAX (マックス), which saw success in the Group Sound category.

He managed the recording of Takuro Yoshida's (吉田拓郎) backing band for 1970's "Poems of Youth" (青春の詩), in addition to working as a studio musician for artists such as Shigeru Izumiya (泉谷しげる), Junko Ohashi (大橋純子), and Furuido (古井戸).

He joined Elec Records in 1972, serving as Creative Director & Head of PR. Responsible for artists such as Hako Yamasaki (山崎ハコ), Eiichi Otaki's Niagara project (ナイアガラ, 大瀧詠一), and Sugar Babe (シュガー・ベイブ) with Tatsuro Yamashita et al. (山下達郎).

He was signed with Polydor Records in 1977. Produced artists such as Keiko Mizukoshi (水越けいこ), Miyuki Kosaka (香坂みゆき), Feifei Ouyang (欧陽菲菲), Kumiko Akiyoshi (秋吉久美子), Gedo (外道), jazz fusion band Casiopea (カシオペア) & its successor JIMSAKU.

He established Mu Music Publishing Inc. in 1996.

He wrote autobiographical essays for Sky Perfect TV (月刊スカイパーフェクTV!), a monthly paper published by Pia Corporation.
