= Cremation in Japan =

Cremation in Japan was originally practiced by monks seeking to emulate the cremation of the Buddha. Virtually all deceased are now cremated in Japan – as of 2012, it had the highest cremation rate in the world of over 99.9%. The Meiji government attempted to ban the practice in the 19th century, but the ban was only in effect for less than two years.

== Religion ==
Cremation in Japan was originally practiced by monks inspired by the Buddha, who gave detailed instructions regarding his own cremation. It was therefore seen as a way of accruing spiritual merit and getting closer to Buddhahood. Cremation also exemplifies the Buddhist teaching of impermanence. Referred to as kasō, which translates to 'fire burial', it is only one of several options mentioned in Buddhist literature, the others being earth burial (dosō), water burial (suisō), open-air burial (fusō, or 'wind burial') and forest burial (rinsō). Water, wind and forest burial accrue the most merit, followed by cremation and then earth burial, which accrues the least merit as it does not offer the body for the benefit of wild plants and animals. Buddhist relics have been found in the ashes of spiritually meritorious individuals.

Most Japanese Christians cremate their dead as well. The issue of limited burial space in Japan is felt particularly by Japanese Muslims, who do not cremate their dead.

== History ==
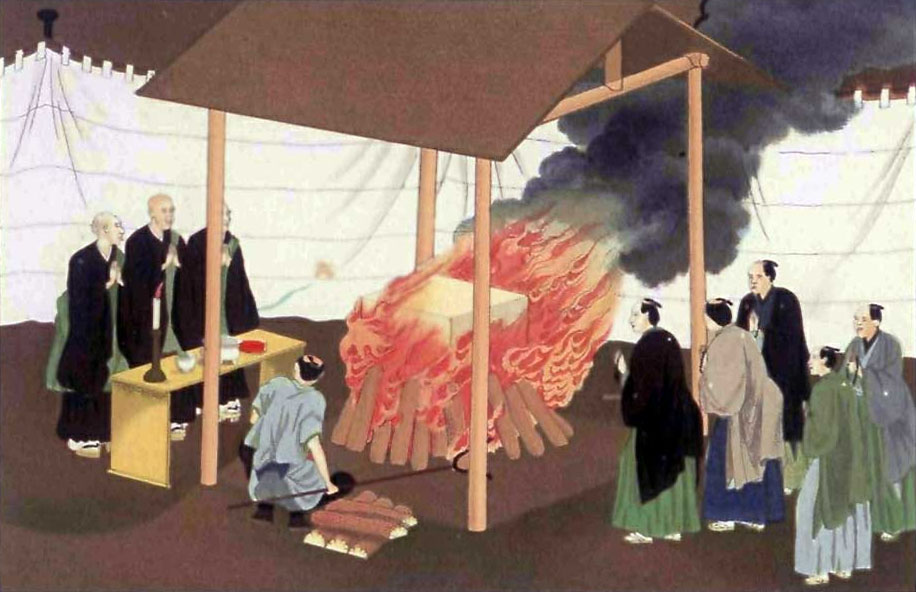
Illustration of an open-air cremation

There is evidence of cremation from the prehistoric Jōmon period. The first notable cremation in Japanese history was that of the Buddhist monk Dōshō in 700 AD. Cremation spread rapidly from this time throughout Japan. Excavations have revealed roughly 2,000 examples of cremation stretching from northern Kyūshū to northeastern Japan (Iwate) with the highest concentrations in the Kinai region of the ancient capitals, the Kantō region of eastern Japan, and northern Kyūshū. The cremation of Empress Jito in 703 AD began an aristocratic tradition which remained generally unbroken until the full-body burial of Emperor Gokomyo in 1654. Even then, his burial was preceded by a symbolic burning. Such false cremations followed by discreet full-body burials became less common with Emperor Komei’s full-body burial in 1867. Towards the end of the Heian period (794–1185), cremation in Japan became a distinctly Buddhist practice, and Buddhist temples came to own or maintain most crematoria. The cost of firewood largely limited cremation to the nobility until the Kamakura period (1185–1333), when it spread to the common people. During the Edo/Tokugawa period (1603–1868), in modern-day Akita prefecture, each household in a certain village would contribute two bundles of straw towards the cremation of a recently deceased member of the community.

Cremation was especially common among Jōdo Shinshū or Shin Buddhists, whose founder Shinran encouraged cremation. Popularity amongst other schools of Buddhism varied. The compactness of the ashes resulting from cremation contributed to the rise of ancestral or family graves.

Crematory workers were generally poor people called 'onboyaki', a term with negative connotations.

=== Anti-cremation movement ===
The notion of cremation as the greatest sin against filial piety originated in China, where it was used as a punishment, during the Song dynasty (960–1279). Japanese Confucians constituted the majority of vocal opponents, claiming that the dead should be treated as if they were still living. This justified ignoring a parent's misguided wish to be cremated and giving them a full-body burial instead.

The Meiji government (1868–1912) sought to replace Buddhist influences on national culture with Shintoist influences. For instance, they used Shinto and Confucian texts to design a new kind of Shinto funeral in an effort to replace Buddhist funerals. Meiji officials continually stressed that cremation was a foreign, Indian practice, brought to Japan via Buddhism. In 1873, Tokyo police relocated crematoria beyond city limits, citing the smell as detrimental to public health. Shinto leaders argued that to approve the relocation of crematoria was to implicitly condone cremation, leading the Meiji government to completely ban the practice on 18 July 1873.

=== Pro-cremation movement ===
During the ban, mourners carried out false cremations by burning firewood atop graves. Advocates argued that cremation was not unfilial as the compactness of the resulting ashes made it easier for people to fulfil the filial task of interring family members together in ancestral graves. The Meiji government was less lenient than the contemporary Qing government in China, which made an exception for those who had died far from home.

Advocates argued that burning bodies were better than rotting ones, citing European studies on the detrimental effect of decomposing bodies on public health, as well as the fact that cremation was being promoted in the West as a hygienic practice.

The ban also affected the practice of full-body burials. The local government in Tokyo planned to use temple grounds for extra burial space, to accommodate the increased full-body burials under the ban. However, the Finance Ministry argued that urban graveyards were a waste of potentially profitable, taxable land. The Council of State decided to ban full-body burial within Tokyo city limits, making no exception for those wishing to be buried in ancestral graves, even those on temple or personal property. After less than two years in effect, the ban was repealed in May 1875.

=== After the repeal ===
In 1878, English traveller Isabella Bird visited a new Japanese crematory equipped with smokestacks, which minimised the impact of crematory smoke on the public. Her description of the facilities was disseminated by Western cremationists. In 1880, German cremationists requested to view plans of another crematory modernised with ventilation systems and a lime filter. In 1884, the British government also requested to view plans, and completed England's first crematory a year later.

An 1897 law mandated the cremation of individuals that had died of communicable infections. A public crematorium was built in every Japanese municipality in the 1910s and 1920s. From the 1920s, firewood was gradually replaced with fossil fuels which produced less smoke and odours, allowing cremation to happen during the daytime. Because families no longer had to travel back to the crematory the next day to collect the ashes, the Buddhist service traditionally held on the seventh day after death could be held on the same day as both the funeral and cremation for convenience.

After the Great Kanto Earthquake of 1923, the majority of those who had been killed in Tokyo were cremated by Buddhist priests at an old military clothing depot, one of twelve areas designated for the cremation of victims. Postcards were spread depicting piles of ashes and bone fragments on the ground beside piles of personal effects removed before cremation.

=== Present day ===
Cremation is now mandatory in most parts of Japan. After death, 24 hours must pass before cremation can take place, unless the cause of death is communicable infection. The ashes, which contain bone fragments (okotsu), can be pulverised into a fine powder for an additional cost. Local governments own and maintain most crematoria, and thus profit minimally from cremation costs. A particular public crematorium in Yokohama charged ¥12 000 for residents and ¥50 000 for visitors in 2016. A shortage in crematoria as Japan's population ages means that families can wait up to 4 days before the deceased can be cremated. Temporary mortuaries, commonly called 'hotels', are now available for families to store the deceased for around ¥9000 a night. Some temples also offer this service.

In the aftermath of the Great East Japan Earthquake of 2011, the bodies of 2,000 victims were temporarily buried due to fuel shortages in the affected area. Many were exhumed before the expected two years had passed, despite their semi-decomposed state, by relatives whose mourning could not be complete without their cremation.

Cremation became more common than full-body burial in the 1930s, and more common in all areas of Japan in the 1970s. As of 2010, Japan had a cremation rate of 99.94%. It is less common in rural areas and in the Okinawan archipelago where the bones of the decomposed body are exhumed, washed, and reburied (senkotsu).

Since the 1990s, there has been the option to pulverise all remains to a fine powder and incorporate them into temoto kuyohin, or 'close-at-hand funerary items' such as memorial diamonds, crystals and ceramics. As of 2016, one third of cremations in Tokyo took place without a funeral. This cheaper and simpler option is called chokuso, or 'direct cremation'.

In 2012, Emperor Akihito and Empress Michiko stated that they wish to be cremated due to concerns over limited space in the imperial graveyard.

== Process of cremation ==
The family may give a monetary gift to the cremator in charge before cremation begins. A Buddhist priest chants a Buddhist scripture, called a sutra, as cremation begins. The chief mourner presses the button to ignite the furnace, or two chief mourners press it together. This action mimics the ignition of the 'death flower', a paper flower traditionally placed atop graves. Igniting the flower or furnace marks the chief mourner's relationship to the deceased as their primary heir and caretaker. Attendees wait in the crematorium as the body is cremated for about 60 to 90 minutes. Lower temperatures of 500 to 600 °C are used than in Western cremation, to retain some bone as fragments. The remains are then placed on a metal tray and moved to the ash collecting room (shū-kotsu-shitsu). Some mourners choose to consume some of the ashes, as they are or mixed with water.

Transferring the ashes into a cinerary urn is traditionally done in male/female pairs as a precaution against the contaminating nature of death, and against accidentally dropping the bones. Mourners approach in order of their relationship to the deceased, and pass bone fragments from one pair of chopsticks to the other. Using chopsticks in this way outside of a bone-picking ceremony (kotsuage) is typically taboo. The chopsticks are longer than those used for eating, and one is wooden and the other bamboo. Sometimes only the left hand is used, or the left hand is used initially before switching to the right hand. Children are not exempt from participation in kotsuage. The bone fragments are transferred in order of those of the feet to those of the skull, so that the deceased will be upright within the urn. It is often necessary for the cremator to break the skull so that it will fit into the urn. The second cervical vertebra is placed in the urn last by the closest relative. Called 'nodobotoke', or 'throat Buddha', it resembles a meditating Buddha. In Eastern Japan, all of the remains are transferred into the urn, whereas in Western Japan, only some of the remains are collected. Mourners often only transfer some of the remains, while crematorium staff finish the task. The urn is then sealed, and placed in a box which is covered with cloth. As for full-body burials, permits for cremation are issued by a city office.

During the Heian period, the cremation site was marked by a 6 foot tall fence, made of cypress bark or bamboo. Its rough construction deliberately distinguished it as a structure meant for the dead. It was also built without digging supports into the ground, to avoid angering the earth deities. At Emperor Go-Ichigo's cremation in 1036, and that of other royals and aristocrats around this time, a second fenced area was built within the first, increasing the religious and imperial sanctity of the inner space. A second fence also further protected the living and the dead from each other. Emperor Go-Ichigo's cremation pit contained straw mats, cloth, silk, and kindling. The various layers protected the dead from any angered earth deities. A ladel, a broom, and a bucket of water were placed at each corner.

=== Pet cremation ===
A Buddhist priest may chant sutras for a pet if it is cremated at a cemetery owned by a temple. Some opt for mass cremation, where the ashes are not collected by the owners but interred by the cemetery.

=== Object cremation ===
Some Buddhists believe that non-sentient objects also have the Buddha-nature, or the potential to attain Buddhahood. Some Japanese people thus express their gratitude towards certain significant material possessions by ceremonially cremating them. Commonly cremated objects include traditional Japanese tools such as needles, writing brushes, tea whisks, and paper umbrellas. Shoes, hairdressing scissors, hats, semiconductors, clocks, watches, and dolls have been cremated as well. One notable ceremony is the annual cremation of wooden chopsticks at Buddhist temples or Shinto shrines for Chopsticks Commemoration Day on the 4th of August.
