= Ryota Katsuki =

Japanese baseball player (born 1982)

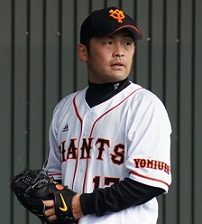
- Katsuki with the Yomiuri Giants
- Pitcher
- Born: July 27, 1982 (age 43); Kurume, Fukuoka, Japan
- Batted: Right Threw: Right

NPB debut
- September 23, 2004, for the Osaka Kintetsu Buffaloes

Last NPB appearance
- July 28, 2015, for the Yomiuri Giants

NPB statistics
- Win–loss record: 18–10
- Earned run average: 3.88
- Strikeouts: 188
- Stats at Baseball Reference

Teams
- Osaka Kintetsu Buffaloes (2004); Orix Buffaloes (2005–2012); Yomiuri Giants (2013–2016)

Ryota Katsuki (香月 良太, Katsuki Ryota; born July 27, 1982) is a Japanese former professional baseball pitcher. He played in Nippon Professional Baseball (NPB) for the Osaka Kintetsu Buffaloes in 2004, the Orix Buffaloes from 2005 to 2012, and the Yomiuri Giants from 2013 to 2016.

== Personal life ==
His younger brother Ryoji is also a former professional baseball player.
