= Ryoji Katsuki =

Japanese baseball player (born 1984)

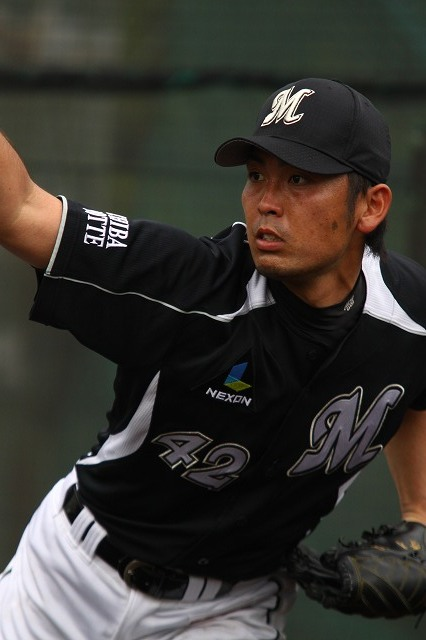
- Katsuki with the Chiba Lotte Marines
- Pitcher
- Born: January 22, 1984 (age 42); Kurume, Fukuoka, Japan
- Batted: Right Threw: Right

NPB debut
- April 29, 2010, for the Chiba Lotte Marines

Last NPB appearance
- 2016, for the Chiba Lotte Marines

NPB statistics
- Win–loss record: 4–3
- Earned run average: 4.58
- Strikeouts: 55
- Stats at Baseball Reference

Teams
- Chiba Lotte Marines (2010, 2012–2016)

Ryoji Katsuki (香月 良仁, born January 22, 1984) is a Japanese former professional baseball pitcher. He played in Nippon Professional Baseball (NPB) for the Chiba Lotte Marines in 2010 and from 2012 to 2016.

== Personal life ==
His elder brother Ryota is also a former professional baseball player.
