= The Preppie Murder =

1989 television film directed by John Herzfeld

- UK DVD cover
- Genre: Crime; Drama
- Written by: John Herzfeld; Irv Roud
- Story by: Irv Roud
- Directed by: John Herzfeld
- Starring: Danny Aiello; William Baldwin; Joanna Kerns; Lara Flynn Boyle; William Devane
- Theme music composer: Chris Isaak; Simon Rogers
- Country of origin: United States
- Original language: English

Production
- Executive producer: Jack Grossbart
- Producers: Sydell Albert; Paul Pompian
- Production locations: Los Angeles; New York City
- Cinematography: Steven Shaw
- Editor: Janet Bartels-Vandagriff
- Running time: 100 minutes
- Production company: Jack Grossbart Productions

Original release
- Network: ABC
- Release: September 24, 1989

The Preppie Murder is an American television film directed by John Herzfeld, written by Herzfeld and Irv Roud, and starring William Baldwin as Robert Chambers and Lara Flynn Boyle as Jennifer Levin. The film aired on ABC in 1989. It was based on the events of a murder committed by Robert Chambers, nicknamed the "Preppie Killer". The film co-stars Danny Aiello, Joanna Kerns and William Devane.

== Plot ==
The film reenacts Robert Chambers' murder of Jennifer Levin. Chambers, a man who attended prep schools on a scholarship, kills Levin, who herself was of a privileged background after they leave a trendy Manhattan bar together. When Detective Mike Sheehan arrests him, Chambers claims that he killed her in self-defense after rough sex got out of hand. In the ensuing trial, Chambers' attorney, Jack Litman, attacks Levin's personal history. Chambers eventually pleads guilty to a lesser charge of manslaughter.

== Cast ==
- Danny Aiello as Detective Mike Sheehan
- William Baldwin as Robert Chambers
- Joanna Kerns as Linda Fairstein
- Lara Flynn Boyle as Jennifer Levin
- Dorothy Fielding as Phyllis Chambers
- James Handy as Detective Joe Brady Quinn
- William Devane as Jack Litman
- Allan Arbus as Arnold Domenitz
- Christine Healy as Ellen Levin
- Herb Mitchell as Robert Chambers, Sr.
- J. C. Quinn as Jack Dorrian
- Alan Blumenfeld as Journalist
- Thalmus Rasulala as Judge Bell
- Alan Rosenberg as Dan Levin
- David Spielberg as Steven Levin
- Mike Sheehan as Lieutenant John Doyle
- Diedrich Bader as Peter Davis
- Sandra Bullock as Stacy
- Steve Dunleavy as Himself
- Lisanne Falk as Alex LaGatta
- Amanda Foreman as Larissa Thomson
- Tuesday Knight as Shawn Kovell
- Emily Kuroda as Reporter
- Andrew Lauer as Josh
- Perrey Reeves as Lauren
- Suzanne Snyder as Kim
- Leonard Termo as Griggs
- Kim Walker as Candace
- Rick Aiello as Policeman
- Rodney Eastman as Jersey
- Francis Guinan as Kendris
- Ava Lazar as Reporter
- Mary Mara as Susan Bird
- Nicole Hansen as Chambermaid

== Production ==
The film was shot mostly in Los Angeles, but some exterior shots took place in New York City. Mike Sheehan, who investigated the case, served as a consultant. Jennifer Levin's parents Steve and Ellen declined involvement; her father called it "exploitative". Linda Fairstein and Jack Litman also declined involvement. Director John Herzfeld wanted to tell Jennifer Levin's story and "clear a little of the mud off her".

== Release ==
The Preppie Murder aired September 24, 1989, on ABC. It was released on home video in November 1993.

== Reception ==
Howard Rosenberg of the Los Angeles Times called it "vexing, powerful and heartbreaking—yet strangely enigmatic". John Leonard of New York called it "pointless" and compared it negatively to Linda Wolfe's book, Wasted: The Preppie Murder. John J. O'Connor of The New York Times wrote that the film's denunciation of the press as exploitative was ironic, as it "merely warms up the old headlines it pretends to abhor."
