= Bibliography about the history of death and funerary practices =

Bibliography of death and funerary practices
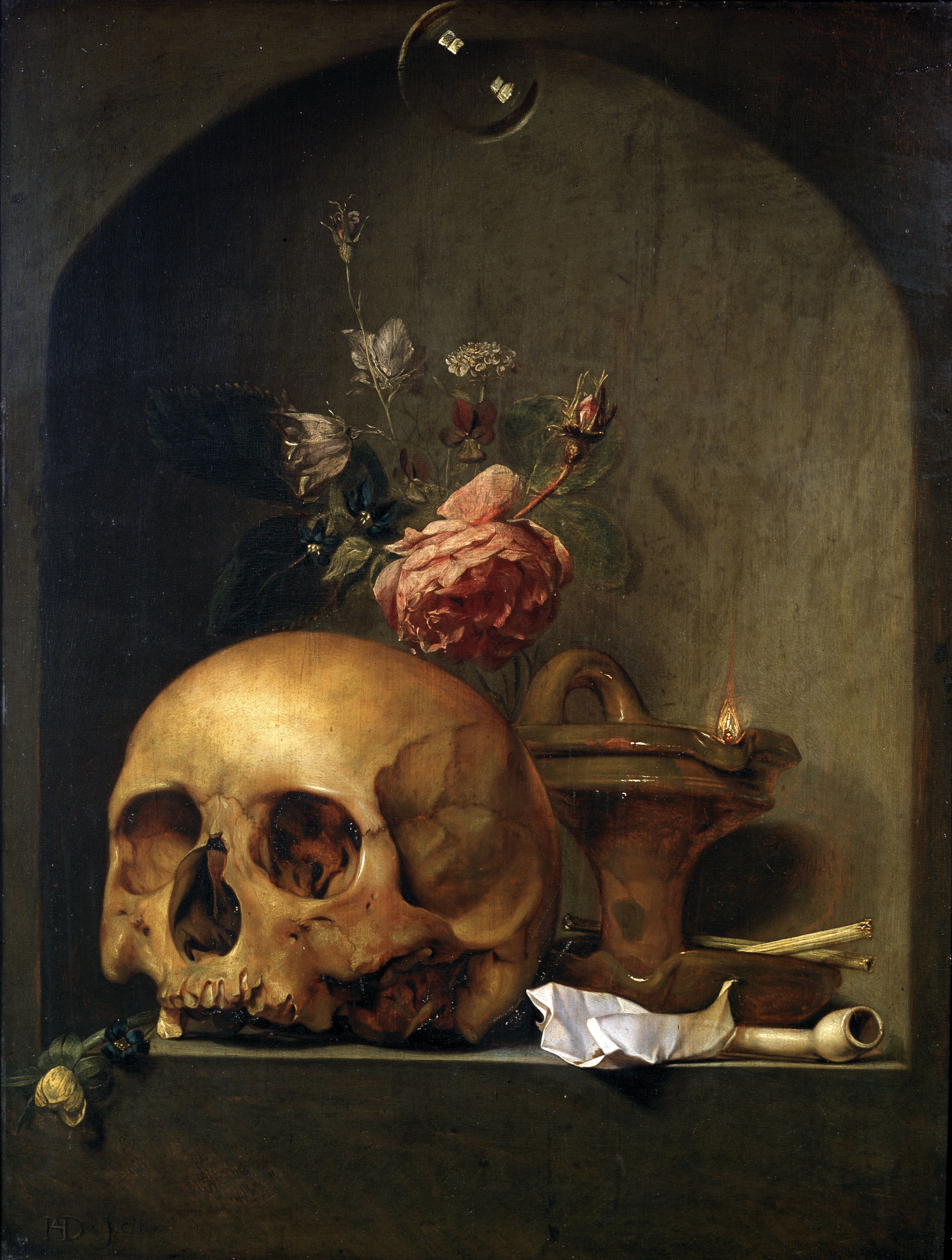
- Vanitas by Hendrick Andriessen, c. 1600–1650, Museum of Fine Arts Ghent
- Subject: History of death, dying, funerary practice and commemoration
- Chronological scope: Prehistory to the present
- Geographic scope: Worldwide
- Language: English-language scholarship
- Arrangement: Disciplinary, chronological, geographic, religious and thematic
- Citation style: APA 7

This is a bibliography about the history of the death and funerary practices and cultural and religious traditions surrounding death and the subjects historical context.

Death is the end of an organism's life. It is the irreversible cessation of the biological functions that sustain a living organism. Entropy, nature's tendency toward disorder, can contribute to the breakdown of living systems over time. After death, organisms stop exhibiting behavior and generally begin to decompose through various physical and chemical processes. Death can occur at any stage of development, including in infancy. A person may experience a reversible clinical death, which in some cases results in a near-death experience. In humans, brain death establishes that an individual has irreversibly died.

Death is dealt with differently in cultures around the world, and it raises ethical issues such as martyrdom, suicide and euthanasia. In a human being, death is the permanent termination of all life-sustaining processes, when every biological system ceases to operate. Death and its spiritual significance are debated throughout the world. Most cultures dispose of their dead with rituals that developed from spiritual traditions.

Bibliography contains academic level English language books (including translations) and journal articles, published mainly post World War II. (Note: Works published before World War II should be limited to areas where there is no significant post World War II books on the subject or when the work in question has significant historical merit.) Book entries may have references to reviews published in academic journals or major newspapers when these could be considered helpful. These reference reviews also function as a resource to find other works on this subject.

Works listed here are cited in the notes or bibliographies of scholarly sources. Each is published by an academic or major press, written by a recognized expert, or substantially reviewed in scholarly journals; borderline cases are omitted. A selection of primary sources are included. Many of the books below carry their own bibliographies; see the Further reading section for other bibliographies, and the External links section for historical sites, academic sites, and museums.

Citations follow APA style. (Note: Entries are in plain text APA 7 format without templates; templates are used only for reviews and notes.) Books have citations to academic journal or mainstream published reviews when available. For books only partly about the subject, relevant chapter or section titles are provided when useful and available. Translators of the original-language edition are included when possible. In cases where a title or name has appeared with more than one English spelling, the most recent published form is used and a footnote documents any earlier title under which the work appeared.

== General surveys ==
- Ariès, P. (1974). Western attitudes toward death: From the Middle Ages to the present (P. M. Ranum, Trans.). Johns Hopkins University Press.
- Ariès, P. (1981). The hour of our death (H. Weaver, Trans.). Knopf.
- Davies, D. J. (2017). Death, ritual and belief: The rhetoric of funerary rites (3rd ed.). Bloomsbury Publishing.
- Jupp, P. C., & Gittings, C. (Eds.). (1999). Death in England: An illustrated history. Manchester University Press.
- Kellehear, A. (2007). A social history of dying. Cambridge University Press.
- Laqueur, T. W. (2015). The work of the dead: A cultural history of mortal remains. Princeton University Press.
- Palgi, P., & Abramovitch, H. (1984). Death: A cross-cultural perspective. Annual Review of Anthropology, 13(1), 385–417. doi:10.1146/annurev.an.13.100184.002125
- Spellman, W. M. (2014). A brief history of death. Reaktion Books.
- Walter, T. (1991). Modern death: Taboo or not taboo? Sociology, 25(2), 293–310. doi:10.1177/0038038591025002009
- Whaley, J. (Ed.). (1981). Mirrors of mortality: Studies in the social history of death. Europa Publications.

== Historiography ==
- Cannon, A. (1989). The historical dimension in mortuary expressions of status and sentiment. Current Anthropology, 30(4), 437–458. doi:10.1086/203764
- McManners, J. (1981). Death and the Enlightenment: Changing attitudes to death among Christians and unbelievers in eighteenth-century France. Clarendon Press.
- Porter, R. (1999). The hour of Philippe Ariès. Mortality, 4(1), 83–90. doi:10.1080/713685963
- Stannard, D. E. (1973). Death and dying in Puritan New England. The American Historical Review, 78(5), 1305–1330. doi:10.1086/ahr/78.5.1305
- Ucko, P. J. (1969). Ethnography and archaeological interpretation of funerary remains. World Archaeology, 1(2), 262–280. doi:10.1080/00438243.1969.9979444
- Vovelle, M. (1980). Rediscovery of death since 1960. The Annals of the American Academy of Political and Social Science, 447(1), 89–99. doi:10.1177/000271628044700112
- Walter, T. (1994). The revival of death. Routledge.

== Archaeology ==
- Binford, L. R. (1971). Mortuary practices: Their study and their potential. Memoirs of the Society for American Archaeology, 6–29.
- Carr, C. (1995). Mortuary practices: Their social, philosophical-religious, circumstantial, and physical determinants. Journal of Archaeological Method and Theory, 2(2), 105–200. doi:10.1007/bf02228990
- Chapman, R., Kinnes, I., & Randsborg, K. (Eds.). (1981). The archaeology of death. Cambridge University Press.
- Duday, H. (2009). The archaeology of the dead: Lectures in archaeothanatology (A. M. Cipriani & J. Pearce, Trans.). Oxbow Books.
- Gowland, R., & Knüsel, C. (Eds.). (2006). Social archaeology of funerary remains. Oxbow Books.
- McKinley, J. I. (1993). Bone fragment size and weights of bone from modern British cremations and the implications for the interpretation of archaeological cremations. International Journal of Osteoarchaeology, 3(4), 283–287. doi:10.1002/oa.1390030406
- Nilsson Stutz, L. (2003). Embodied rituals and ritualized bodies: Tracing ritual practices in Late Mesolithic burials. Almqvist & Wiksell International.
- Parker Pearson, M. (2000). The archaeology of death and burial. Texas A&M University Press.
- Rakita, G. F. M., Buikstra, J. E., Beck, L. A., & Williams, S. R. (Eds.). (2005). Interacting with the dead: Perspectives on mortuary archaeology for the new millennium. University Press of Florida.
- Tarlow, S., & Nilsson Stutz, L. (Eds.). (2013). The Oxford handbook of the archaeology of death and burial. Oxford University Press.
- Thompson, T. (Ed.). (2015). The archaeology of cremation: Burned human remains in funerary studies. Oxbow Books. JSTOR j.ctvh1drsq
- Ucko, P. J. (1969). Ethnography and archaeological interpretation of funerary remains. World Archaeology, 1(2), 262–280. doi:10.1080/00438243.1969.9979444

== Anthropology ==
- Bloch, M. (1971). Placing the dead: Tombs, ancestral villages, and kinship organization in Madagascar. Seminar Press.
- Bloch, M., & Parry, J. (Eds.). (1982). Death and the regeneration of life. Cambridge University Press.
- Engelke, M. (2019). The anthropology of death revisited. Annual Review of Anthropology, 48(1), 29–44. doi:10.1146/annurev-anthro-102218-011420
- Goody, J. (1962). Death, property and the ancestors: A study of the mortuary customs of the LoDagaa of West Africa. Stanford University Press.
- Hertz, R. (2013). Death and the right hand (R. Needham & C. Needham, Trans.). Routledge.
- Metcalf, P., & Huntington, R. (1991). Celebrations of death: The anthropology of mortuary ritual (2nd ed.). Cambridge University Press.
- Palgi, P., & Abramovitch, H. (1984). Death: A cross-cultural perspective. Annual Review of Anthropology, 13(1), 385–417. doi:10.1146/annurev.an.13.100184.002125
- Robben, A. C. G. M. (Ed.). (2004). Death, mourning, and burial: A cross-cultural reader. Blackwell.
- van Gennep, A. (2013). The rites of passage. Routledge.

== Chronological ==
=== Prehistory ===
- Aspöck, E., Klevnäs, A., & Müller-Scheeßel, N. (Eds.). (2020). Grave disturbances: The archaeology of post-depositional interactions with the dead. Oxbow Books. JSTOR j.ctv13pk784
- Bradley, R. (1998). The significance of monuments: On the shaping of human experience in Neolithic and Bronze Age Europe. Routledge.
- Brück, J. (2004). Material metaphors: The relational construction of identity in Early Bronze Age burials in Ireland and Britain. Journal of Social Archaeology, 4(3), 307–333. doi:10.1177/1469605304046417
- Brück, J. (2019). Personifying prehistory: Relational ontologies in Bronze Age Britain and Ireland. Oxford University Press. doi:10.1093/oso/9780198768012.001.0001
- Croucher, K. (2012). Death and dying in the Neolithic Near East. Oxford University Press. doi:10.1093/acprof:osobl/9780199693955.001.0001
- Cummings, V., & Richards, C. (2021). Monuments in the making: Raising the great dolmens in early Neolithic northern Europe. Oxbow Books. JSTOR j.ctv13gvgn9
- Gargett, R. H. (1989). Grave shortcomings: The evidence for Neandertal burial. Current Anthropology, 30(2), 157–190. doi:10.1086/203725
- Grünberg, J. M. (2024). Mesolithic burials and mortuary practices: Traditions, developments and individuality of the early postglacial hunter-fisher-gatherers in Europe. L'Anthropologie, 128(3), 103278. doi:10.1016/j.anthro.2024.103278
- Haddow, S. D., & Knüsel, C. J. (2017). Skull retrieval and secondary burial practices in the Neolithic Near East: Recent insights from Çatalhöyük, Turkey. Bioarchaeology International, 1(1–2). doi:10.5744/bi.2017.1002
- Harding, D. W. (2016). Death and burial in Iron Age Britain. Oxford University Press. doi:10.1093/oso/9780199687565.001.0001
- Kuijt, I. (2008). The regeneration of life: Neolithic structures of symbolic remembering and forgetting. Current Anthropology, 49(2), 171–197. doi:10.1086/526097
- Parker Pearson, M. (1993). The powerful dead: Archaeological relationships between the living and the dead. Cambridge Archaeological Journal, 3(2), 203–229. doi:10.1017/s0959774300000846
- Pettitt, P. (2010). The Palaeolithic origins of human burial. Routledge. doi:10.4324/9780203813300
- Rendu, W., Beauval, C., Crevecoeur, I., Bayle, P., Balzeau, A., Bismuth, T., Bourguignon, L., Delfour, G., Faivre, J.-P., Lacrampe-Cuyaubère, F., Tavormina, C., Todisco, D., Turq, A., & Maureille, B. (2014). Evidence supporting an intentional Neandertal burial at La Chapelle-aux-Saints. Proceedings of the National Academy of Sciences, 111(1), 81–86. doi:10.1073/pnas.1316780110

=== Ancient ===
- Assmann, J. (2005). Death and salvation in ancient Egypt (D. Lorton, Trans.). Cornell University Press.
- Carroll, M. (2006). Spirits of the dead: Roman funerary commemoration in Western Europe. Oxford University Press.
- Garland, R. (1985). The Greek way of death. Cornell University Press.
- Hope, V. M. (2007). Death in ancient Rome: A sourcebook. Routledge.
- Ikram, S., & Dodson, A. (1998). The mummy in ancient Egypt: Equipping the dead for eternity. Thames & Hudson.
- Morris, I. (1987). Burial and ancient society: The rise of the Greek city-state. Cambridge University Press.
- Morris, I. (1992). Death-ritual and social structure in classical antiquity. Cambridge University Press.
- Sourvinou-Inwood, C. (1995). "Reading" Greek death: To the end of the Classical period. Oxford University Press.
- Taylor, J. H. (2001). Death and the afterlife in ancient Egypt. British Museum Press.
- Toynbee, J. M. C. (1971). Death and burial in the Roman world. Thames & Hudson.
- Vermeule, E. (1979). Aspects of death in early Greek art and poetry. University of California Press.

=== Medieval ===
- Binski, P. (1996). Medieval death: Ritual and representation. Cornell University Press.
- Booth, P., & Tingle, E. (Eds.). (2021). A companion to death, burial, and remembrance in late medieval and early modern Europe, c. 1300–1700. Brill. doi:10.1163/9789004443433
- Brown, E. A. R. (1981). Death and the human body in the later Middle Ages: The legislation of Boniface VIII on the division of the corpse. Viator, 12, 221–270. doi:10.1484/j.viator.2.301488
- Bynum, C. W. (1995). The resurrection of the body in Western Christianity, 200–1336. Columbia University Press.
- Cohn, S. K. (1988). Death and property in Siena, 1205–1800: Strategies for the afterlife. Johns Hopkins University Press.
- Daniell, C. (1997). Death and burial in medieval England 1066–1550. Routledge.
- Effros, B. (2002). Caring for body and soul: Burial and the afterlife in the Merovingian world. Pennsylvania State University Press.
- Effros, B. (2003). Merovingian mortuary archaeology and the making of the early Middle Ages. University of California Press. doi:10.1525/california/9780520232440.001.0001
- Geary, P. J. (1994). Living with the dead in the Middle Ages. Cornell University Press.
- Gilchrist, R. (2008). Magic for the dead? The archaeology of magic in later medieval burials. Medieval Archaeology, 52(1), 119–159. doi:10.1179/174581708x335468
- Härke, H. (2014). Grave goods in early medieval burials: Messages and meanings. Mortality, 19(1), 41–60. doi:10.1080/13576275.2013.870544
- McLaughlin, M. (1994). Consorting with saints: Prayer for the dead in early medieval France. Cornell University Press.
- Paravicini Bagliani, A. (2000). The pope's body (D. S. Peterson, Trans.). University of Chicago Press.
- Park, K. (1995). The life of the corpse: Division and dissection in late medieval Europe. Journal of the History of Medicine and Allied Sciences, 50(1), 111–132. doi:10.1093/jhmas/50.1.111
- Paxton, F. S. (1990). Christianizing death: The creation of a ritual process in early medieval Europe. Cornell University Press.
- Reynolds, A. (2009). Anglo-Saxon deviant burial customs. Oxford University Press.
- Sayer, D. (2020). Early Anglo-Saxon cemeteries: Kinship, community and identity. Manchester University Press.
- Weiss-Krejci, E. (2001). Restless corpses: 'Secondary burial' in the Babenberg and Habsburg dynasties. Antiquity, 75(290), 769–780. doi:10.1017/s0003598x00089274
- Williams, H. (2006). Death and memory in early medieval Britain. Cambridge University Press.

=== Modern (c. 1800–1945) ===
- Goebel, S. (2007). The Great War and medieval memory: War, remembrance and medievalism in Britain and Germany, 1914–1940. Cambridge University Press.
- Jalland, P. (1996). Death in the Victorian family. Oxford University Press.
- Kselman, T. A. (1993). Death and the afterlife in modern France. Princeton University Press.
- Laqueur, T. W. (1983). Bodies, death, and pauper funerals. Representations, 1(1), 109–131. doi:10.1525/rep.1983.1.1.99p0385r
- Mosse, G. L. (1990). Fallen soldiers: Reshaping the memory of the world wars. Oxford University Press.
- Richardson, R. (1987). Death, dissection and the destitute. Routledge & Kegan Paul.
- Ruby, J. (1995). Secure the shadow: Death and photography in America. MIT Press.
- Rugg, J. (2000). Defining the place of burial: What makes a cemetery a cemetery? Mortality, 5(3), 259–275. doi:10.1080/713686011
- Sherman, D. J. (1999). The construction of memory in interwar France. University of Chicago Press.
- Strange, J.-M. (2003). Only a pauper whom nobody owns: Reassessing the pauper grave c. 1880–1914. Past & Present, 178(1), 148–175. doi:10.1093/past/178.1.148
- Strange, J.-M. (2005). Death, grief and poverty in Britain, 1870–1914. Cambridge University Press.
- Winter, J. (1995). Sites of memory, sites of mourning: The Great War in European cultural history. Cambridge University Press.
- Wolffe, J. (2000). Great deaths: Grieving, religion, and nationhood in Victorian and Edwardian Britain. Oxford University Press.

=== Contemporary (since 1945) ===
- Arnold, M., Gibbs, M., Kohn, T., Meese, J., & Nansen, B. (2017). Death and digital media. Routledge. doi:10.4324/9781315688749
- Doss, E. (2010). Memorial mania: Public feeling in America. University of Chicago Press.
- Jacobsen, M. H. (2016). "Spectacular death"—Proposing a new fifth phase to Philippe Ariès's admirable history of death. Humanities, 5(2), 19. doi:10.3390/h5020019
- Jalland, P. (2010). Death in war and peace: A history of loss and grief in England, 1914–1970. Oxford University Press.
- Jupp, P. C. (2006). From dust to ashes: Cremation and the British way of death. Palgrave Macmillan.
- Lee, R. L. M. (2008). Modernity, mortality and re-enchantment: The death taboo revisited. Sociology, 42(4), 745–759. doi:10.1177/0038038508091626
- Posel, D., & Gupta, P. (2009). The life of the corpse: Framing reflections and questions. African Studies, 68(3), 299–309. doi:10.1080/00020180903381248
- Rosenblatt, A. (2015). Digging for the disappeared: Forensic science after atrocity. Stanford University Press.
- Sturken, M. (1997). Tangled memories: The Vietnam War, the AIDS epidemic, and the politics of remembering. University of California Press.
- Troyer, J. (2020). Technologies of the human corpse. MIT Press. doi:10.7551/mitpress/11261.001.0001
- Wagner, S. E. (2008). To know where he lies: DNA technology and the search for Srebrenica's missing. University of California Press. doi:10.1525/9780520942622
- Walter, T. (2014). New mourners, old mourners: Online memorial culture as a chapter in the history of mourning. New Review of Hypermedia and Multimedia, 21(1–2), 10–24. doi:10.1080/13614568.2014.983555
- Young, J. E. (1993). The texture of memory: Holocaust memorials and meaning. Yale University Press.

== Geographic ==
=== Africa ===
- Cohen, D. W., & Odhiambo, E. S. A. (1992). Burying SM: The politics of knowledge and the sociology of power in Africa. Heinemann.
- de Witte, M. (2003). Money and death: Funeral business in Asante, Ghana. Africa, 73(4), 531–559. doi:10.3366/afr.2003.73.4.531
- Fontein, J. (2010). Between tortured bodies and resurfacing bones: The politics of the dead in Zimbabwe. Journal of Material Culture, 15(4), 423–448. doi:10.1177/1359183510383105
- Jindra, M., & Noret, J. (Eds.). (2011). Funerals in Africa: Explorations of a social phenomenon. Berghahn Books. doi:10.3167/9780857452054
- Jua, N. (2005). The mortuary sphere, privilege and the politics of belonging in contemporary Cameroon. Africa, 75(3), 325–355. doi:10.3366/afr.2005.75.3.325
- Klaits, F. (2010). Death in a church of life: Moral passion during Botswana's time of AIDS. University of California Press. doi:10.1525/9780520945845
- Lee, R., & Vaughan, M. (2008). Death and dying in the history of Africa since 1800. The Journal of African History, 49(3), 341–359. doi:10.1017/S0021853708003952
- Lee, R. (2011). Death 'on the move': Funerals, entrepreneurs and the rural–urban nexus in South Africa. Africa, 81(2), 226–247. doi:10.1017/s0001972011000040
- Ranger, T. (2004). Dignifying death: The politics of burial in Bulawayo. Journal of Religion in Africa, 34(1–2), 110–144. doi:10.1163/157006604323056741
- van der Geest, S. (2000). Funerals for the living: Conversations with elderly people in Kwahu, Ghana. African Studies Review, 43(3), 103–129. JSTOR 525071
- Whyte, S. R. (2005). Going home? Belonging and burial in the era of AIDS. Africa, 75(2), 154–172. doi:10.3366/afr.2005.75.2.154

=== Americas ===
==== United States ====
- Basmajian, C. W., & Coutts, C. (2010). Planning for the disposal of the dead. Journal of the American Planning Association, 76(3), 305–317. doi:10.1080/01944361003791913
- Farrell, J. J. (1980). Inventing the American way of death, 1830–1920. Temple University Press.
- Faust, D. G. (2001). The Civil War soldier and the art of dying. The Journal of Southern History, 67(1). JSTOR 3070083
- Faust, D. G. (2008). This republic of suffering: Death and the American Civil War. Alfred A. Knopf.
- French, S. (1974). The cemetery as cultural institution: The establishment of Mount Auburn and the "rural cemetery" movement. American Quarterly, 26(1), 37–59. JSTOR 2711566
- Jamieson, R. W. (1995). Material culture and social death: African-American burial practices. Historical Archaeology, 29(4), 39–58. doi:10.1007/bf03374216
- Laderman, G. (1996). The sacred remains: American attitudes toward death, 1799–1883. Yale University Press.
- McElya, M. (2016). The politics of mourning: Death and honor in Arlington National Cemetery. Harvard University Press.
- Meyer, R. E. (Ed.). (1993). Ethnicity and the American cemetery. Bowling Green State University Popular Press.
- Schantz, M. S. (2008). Awaiting the heavenly country: The Civil War and America's culture of death. Cornell University Press. doi:10.7591/9780801459252
- Seeman, E. R. (2010). Death in the New World: Cross-cultural encounters, 1492–1800. University of Pennsylvania Press.
- Smith, S. E. (2010). To serve the living: Funeral directors and the African American way of death. Harvard University Press. doi:10.4159/9780674054646
- Stannard, D. E. (1977). The Puritan way of death: A study in religion, culture, and social change. Oxford University Press.

==== Canada ====
- Brown, E., & Cook, T. (2011). The 1936 Vimy pilgrimage. Canadian Military History, 20(2), 37–54.
- Lai, D. C.-Y. (1987). The Chinese cemetery in Victoria. BC Studies, 75, 24–42. doi:10.14288/bcs.v0i75.1270
- Laugrand, F. (2019). The beauty of the afterlife among the Inuit of Nunavut. In H. Selin & R. M. Rakoff (Eds.), Death across cultures: Death and dying in non-Western cultures (pp. 351–367). Springer. doi:10.1007/978-3-030-18826-9_21
- McKillop, H. (1995). Recognizing children's graves in nineteenth-century cemeteries: Excavations in St. Thomas Anglican Churchyard, Belleville, Ontario, Canada. Historical Archaeology, 29(2), 77–99. doi:10.1007/bf03373582
- Poulter, G. (2012). What's traditional about "the traditional funeral"? Funeral rituals and the evolution of the funeral industry in Nova Scotia. Journal of the Canadian Historical Association, 22(1), 133–159. doi:10.7202/1008960ar
- Truth and Reconciliation Commission of Canada. (2015). Canada's residential schools: Missing children and unmarked burials (The final report of the Truth and Reconciliation Commission of Canada, Vol. 4). McGill-Queen's University Press. doi:10.1515/9780773598256
- Vance, J. F. (1997). Death so noble: Memory, meaning, and the First World War. UBC Press. doi:10.59962/9780774854894
- Young, B., & James, G. (2003). Respectable burial: Montreal's Mount Royal Cemetery. McGill-Queen's University Press. doi:10.1515/9780773570986

==== Latin America and the Caribbean ====
- Brandes, S. (1998). Iconography in Mexico's Day of the Dead: Origins and meaning. Ethnohistory, 45(2). JSTOR 483058
- Brandes, S. (2006). Skulls to the living, bread to the dead: The Day of the Dead in Mexico and beyond. Blackwell.
- Brown, V. (2008). The reaper's garden: Death and power in the world of Atlantic slavery. Harvard University Press.
- Conklin, B. A. (2001). Consuming grief: Compassionate cannibalism in an Amazonian society. University of Texas Press.
- Crossland, Z. (2000). Buried lives: Forensic archaeology and the disappeared in Argentina. Archaeological Dialogues, 7(2), 146–159. doi:10.1017/s1380203800001707
- Dillehay, T. D. (Ed.). (1995). Tombs for the living: Andean mortuary practices. Dumbarton Oaks Research Library and Collection.
- Lomnitz, C. (2005). Death and the idea of Mexico. Zone Books.
- Ramos, G. (2010). Death and conversion in the Andes: Lima and Cuzco, 1532–1670. University of Notre Dame Press.
- Reis, J. J. (1992). "Death to the cemetery": Funerary reform and rebellion in Brazil, 1836. History Workshop Journal, 34(1), 33–46. doi:10.1093/hwj/34.1.33
- Reis, J. J. (2003). Death is a festival: Funeral rites and rebellion in nineteenth-century Brazil (H. S. Gledhill, Trans.). University of North Carolina Press.
- Sanford, V. (2003). Buried secrets: Truth and human rights in Guatemala. Palgrave Macmillan. doi:10.1057/9781403973375
- Voekel, P. (2002). Alone before God: The religious origins of modernity in Mexico. Duke University Press. doi:10.1215/9780822384298

=== Asia ===
==== East Asia ====
- Bernstein, A. (2006). Modern passings: Death rites, politics, and social change in Imperial Japan. University of Hawai'i Press.
- Breen, J. (2004). The dead and the living in the land of peace: A sociology of the Yasukuni shrine. Mortality, 9(1), 76–93. doi:10.1080/13576270410001652550
- Ebrey, P. B. (1990). Cremation in Sung China. The American Historical Review, 95(2), 406–428. doi:10.1086/ahr/95.2.406
- Eom, S. (2022). Bulldozing the dead: Chinese, citizenry, and cemetery in post-colonial South Korea. Modern Asian Studies, 57(1), 53–69. doi:10.1017/s0026749x21000470
- Harrell, S. (1979). The concept of soul in Chinese folk religion. The Journal of Asian Studies, 38(3), 519–528. doi:10.1017/s002191180014104x
- Horlyck, C., & Pettid, M. J. (Eds.). (2014). Death, mourning, and the afterlife in Korea: From ancient to contemporary times. University of Hawai'i Press.
- Hur, N. (2007). Death and social order in Tokugawa Japan: Buddhism, anti-Christianity, and the danka system. Harvard University Asia Center. doi:10.1163/9781684174522
- Kim, S. U. (2025). Buddhist death rituals in late Chosŏn. International Journal of Buddhist Thought and Culture, 35(2), 113–140. doi:10.16893/ijbtc.2025.12.35.2.113
- Kutcher, N. (1999). Mourning in late imperial China: Filial piety and the state. Cambridge University Press. doi:10.1017/cbo9780511572746
- Lai, G. (2015). Excavating the afterlife: The archaeology of early Chinese religion. University of Washington Press.
- Meyer-Fong, T. (2013). What remains: Coming to terms with civil war in 19th century China. Stanford University Press.
- Smith, R. J. (1974). Ancestor worship in contemporary Japan. Stanford University Press.
- Takenaka, A. (2015). Yasukuni Shrine: History, memory, and Japan's unending postwar. University of Hawai'i Press. doi:10.21313/hawaii/9780824846787.001.0001
- Wang, H., & Lee, J. T.-H. (2025). No rest for the dead: Relocation of emigrant graves in 1950s South China. Asian Ethnology, 84(2), 312–334. doi:10.15119/0002001932
- Watson, J. L., & Rawski, E. S. (Eds.). (1988). Death ritual in late imperial and modern China. University of California Press.

==== South Asia ====
- Arnold, D. (2016). Burning issues: Cremation and incineration in modern India. NTM Zeitschrift für Geschichte der Wissenschaften, Technik und Medizin, 24(4), 393–419. doi:10.1007/s00048-017-0158-7
- Chopra, R. (2016). Seeing off the dead: Post-mortem photographs in the Darbar Sahib. Sikh Formations, 12(2–3), 207–222. doi:10.1080/17448727.2017.1289682
- Desjarlais, R. (2016). Subject to death: Life and loss in a Buddhist world. University of Chicago Press.
- Hawley, J. S. (Ed.). (1994). Sati, the blessing and the curse: The burning of wives in India. Oxford University Press. doi:10.1093/oso/9780195077742.001.0001
- Laidlaw, J. (2005). A life worth leaving: Fasting to death as telos of a Jain religious life. Economy and Society, 34(2), 178–199. doi:10.1080/03085140500054545
- Langer, R. (2007). Buddhist rituals of death and rebirth: Contemporary Sri Lankan practice and its origins. Routledge.
- Mani, L. (1998). Contentious traditions: The debate on sati in colonial India. University of California Press.
- Parry, J. (1980). Ghosts, greed and sin: The occupational identity of the Benares funeral priests. Man, 15(1), 88. JSTOR 2802004
- Vitebsky, P. (1993). Dialogues with the dead: The discussion of mortality among the Sora of Eastern India. Cambridge University Press.
- Weinberger-Thomas, C. (1999). Ashes of immortality: Widow-burning in India (J. Mehlman & D. G. White, Trans.). University of Chicago Press. (Original work published 1996)

==== Southeast Asia ====
- Guillou, A. Y. (2012). An alternative memory of the Khmer Rouge genocide: The dead of the mass graves and the land guardian spirits [Neak ta]. South East Asia Research, 20(2), 207–226. doi:10.5367/sear.2012.0102
- Hall, R. S. (2015). Materiality and death: Visual arts and Northern Thai funerals. Journal of Southeast Asian Studies, 46(3), 346–367. doi:10.1017/s0022463415000296
- Klima, A. (2002). The funeral casino: Meditation, massacre, and exchange with the dead in Thailand. Princeton University Press. doi:10.1515/9781400824960
- Kwon, H. (2006). After the massacre: Commemoration and consolation in Ha My and My Lai. University of California Press.
- Kwon, H. (2007). The dollarization of Vietnamese ghost money. Journal of the Royal Anthropological Institute, 13(1), 73–90. doi:10.1111/j.1467-9655.2007.00414.x
- Kwon, H. (2008). Ghosts of war in Vietnam. Cambridge University Press.
- Malarney, S. K. (1996). The limits of "state functionalism" and the reconstruction of funerary ritual in contemporary northern Vietnam. American Ethnologist, 23(3), 540–560. doi:10.1525/ae.1996.23.3.02a00050
- Malarney, S. K. (2002). Culture, ritual and revolution in Vietnam. University of Hawai'i Press.
- Marston, J. A. (2006). Death, memory and building: The non-cremation of a Cambodian monk. Journal of Southeast Asian Studies, 37(3), 491–505. doi:10.1017/s0022463406000750
- Metcalf, P. (1982). A Borneo journey into death: Berawan eschatology from its rituals. University of Pennsylvania Press. doi:10.9783/9781512818079
- Volkman, T. A. (1985). Feasts of honor: Ritual and change in the Toraja highlands. University of Illinois Press.
- Yeoh, B. S. A. (1991). The control of "sacred" space: Conflicts over the Chinese burial grounds in colonial Singapore, 1880–1930. Journal of Southeast Asian Studies, 22(2), 282–311. doi:10.1017/s0022463400003891

=== Europe ===
- Balkan, O. (2023). Dying abroad: The political afterlives of migration in Europe. Cambridge University Press.
- Bucur, M. (2009). Heroes and victims: Remembering war in twentieth-century Romania. Indiana University Press.
- Danforth, L. M. (1983). The death rituals of rural Greece. Princeton University Press.
- De Spiegeleer, C. (2019). Secularization and the modern history of funerary culture in Europe: Conflict and market competition around death, burial and cremation. Trajecta, 28(2), 169–201. doi:10.5117/tra2019.2.002.desp
- Ferrándiz, F. (2006). The return of Civil War ghosts: The ethnography of exhumations in contemporary Spain. Anthropology Today, 22(3), 7–12. doi:10.1111/j.1467-8322.2006.00437.x
- Koslofsky, C. (1995). Honour and violence in German Lutheran funerals in the confessional age. Social History, 20(3), 315–337. doi:10.1080/03071029508567945
- Kselman, T. A. (1988). Funeral conflicts in nineteenth-century France. Comparative Studies in Society and History, 30(2), 312–332. doi:10.1017/s0010417500015218
- Kselman, T. A. (1993). Death and the afterlife in modern France. Princeton University Press.
- McManners, J. (1981). Death and the Enlightenment: Changing attitudes to death among Christians and unbelievers in eighteenth-century France. Clarendon Press.
- Merridale, C. (2000). Night of stone: Death and memory in twentieth-century Russia. Viking.
- Price, N. (2010). Passing into poetry: Viking-Age mortuary drama and the origins of Norse mythology. Medieval Archaeology, 54(1), 123–156. doi:10.1179/174581710X12790370815779
- Seremetakis, C. N. (1991). The last word: Women, death, and divination in Inner Mani. University of Chicago Press.
- Strocchia, S. T. (1992). Death and ritual in Renaissance Florence. Johns Hopkins University Press.
- Tumarkin, N. (1983). Lenin lives! The Lenin cult in Soviet Russia. Harvard University Press.

==== Britain and Ireland ====
- Cressy, D. (1997). Birth, marriage, and death: Ritual, religion, and the life-cycle in Tudor and Stuart England. Oxford University Press.
- Gaffney, A. (1998). Aftermath: Remembering the Great War in Wales. University of Wales Press.
- Hurren, E. T. (2012). Dying for Victorian medicine: English anatomy and its trade in the dead poor, c. 1834–1929. Palgrave Macmillan. doi:10.1057/9780230355651
- Jupp, P. C. (2006). From dust to ashes: Cremation and the British way of death. Palgrave Macmillan.
- Laqueur, T. W. (1983). Bodies, death, and pauper funerals. Representations, 1(1), 109–131. doi:10.1525/rep.1983.1.1.99p0385r
- Lysaght, P. (1997). "Caoineadh os cionn coirp": The lament for the dead in Ireland. Folklore, 108(1–2), 65–82. doi:10.1080/0015587x.1997.9715938
- MacDonald, H. (2006). Human remains: Dissection and its histories. Yale University Press.
- Richardson, R. (1987). Death, dissection and the destitute. Routledge & Kegan Paul.
- Rugg, J. (2013). Churchyard and cemetery: Tradition and modernity in rural North Yorkshire. Manchester University Press.
- Strange, J.-M. (2003). Only a pauper whom nobody owns: Reassessing the pauper grave c. 1880–1914. Past & Present, 178(1), 148–175. doi:10.1093/past/178.1.148
- Tait, C. (2002). Death, burial and commemoration in Ireland, 1550–1650. Palgrave Macmillan. doi:10.1057/9781403913951
- Tarlow, S. (1999). Bereavement and commemoration: An archaeology of mortality. Blackwell.
- Tarlow, S. (2010). Ritual, belief and the dead in early modern Britain and Ireland. Cambridge University Press. doi:10.1017/cbo9780511778629
- Taylor, L. J. (1989). Bás InEirinn: Cultural constructions of death in Ireland. Anthropological Quarterly, 62(4), 175. JSTOR 3317614

=== Middle East and North Africa ===
- Abu-Lughod, L. (1993). Islam and the gendered discourses of death. International Journal of Middle East Studies, 25(2), 187–205. doi:10.1017/s0020743800058487
- Aghaie, K. S. (2004). The martyrs of Karbala: Shi'i symbols and rituals in modern Iran. University of Washington Press.
- Chesson, M. S. (2023). Early Bronze Age IA mortuary practices and difference on the south-eastern Dead Sea Plain, Jordan. Levant, 55(1), 61–77. doi:10.1080/00758914.2022.2151265
- Demir, B. T. (2024). Spilling pig blood in the Muslim cemetery: The effort to expel a dragoman in early-modern Ottoman Istanbul. Journal of the Ottoman and Turkish Studies Association, 11(1), 179–207. doi:10.2979/tur.00027
- Gündoğdu, C., & Balsoy, G. (2025). From the deathbed to the register: Administering the dead in the early nineteenth-century Ottoman Empire. Social History of Medicine, 38(4), 771–786. doi:10.1093/shm/hkae059
- Khalili, L. (2007). Heroes and martyrs of Palestine: The politics of national commemoration. Cambridge University Press. doi:10.1017/cbo9780511492235
- Meri, J. W. (2002). The cult of saints among Muslims and Jews in medieval Syria. Oxford University Press.
- Petersen, A., & el-Khoury, Y. (2020). Tombs of the pasha and the grave politics of late Ottoman Lebanon. International Journal of Historical Archaeology, 25(2), 375–422. doi:10.1007/s10761-020-00558-4
- Taxel, I., Marom, R., & Nagar, Y. (2025). An infant jar burial from Zarnūqa: Muslim funerary practices and migrant communities in late Ottoman Palestine. 'Atiqot, 117(1). doi:10.70967/2948-040x.2262
- Taylor, C. S. (1999). In the vicinity of the righteous: Ziyara and the veneration of Muslim saints in late medieval Egypt. Brill. doi:10.1163/9789004492721
- Volk, L. (2010). Memorials and martyrs in modern Lebanon. Indiana University Press.

=== Oceania ===
- Battaglia, D. (1990). On the bones of the serpent: Person, memory, and mortality in Sabarl Island society. University of Chicago Press.
- Damon, F. H., & Wagner, R. (Eds.). (1989). Death rituals and life in the societies of the Kula Ring. Northern Illinois University Press.
- Fraser, L. (2017). Death in nineteenth-century Australia and New Zealand. History Compass, 15(7). doi:10.1111/hic3.12399
- Glaskin, K., Tonkinson, M., Musharbash, Y., & Burbank, V. (Eds.). (2008). Mortality, mourning and mortuary practices in Indigenous Australia. Ashgate.
- Hemer, S. R. (2010). Grief as social experience: Death and bereavement in Lihir, Papua New Guinea. The Australian Journal of Anthropology, 21(3), 281–297. doi:10.1111/j.1757-6547.2010.00097.x
- Hutchinson-Wong, R. G., & Boswijk, G. (2024). Uncompromisingly unique: Tracing the origins of Waikūmete Cemetery in Auckland, New Zealand, 1870–1886. New Zealand Geographer, 80(3), 209–219. doi:10.1111/nzg.12407
- Inglis, K. S. (1998). Sacred places: War memorials in the Australian landscape. Melbourne University Press.
- Jalland, P. (2002). Australian ways of death: A social and cultural history, 1840–1918. Oxford University Press.
- Light, R. (2018). Unknown Anzacs: The politics and performance of bodily repatriation in postcolonial state formation. Australian Historical Studies, 49(2), 237–254. doi:10.1080/1031461x.2018.1449873
- Lipset, D., & Silverman, E. K. (Eds.). (2016). Mortuary dialogues: Death ritual and the reproduction of moral community in Pacific modernities. Berghahn Books. doi:10.3167/9781785331718
- Moeke-Maxwell, T., Robinson, J., & Gott, M. (2024). Pōuritanga: Whānau Māori experiences of end-of-life caregiving, death and tangihanga (funeral customs) during New Zealand's COVID-19 lockdowns. Journal of the Royal Society of New Zealand, 55(2), 287–301. doi:10.1080/03036758.2024.2345314
- Mytum, H. (2020). Commemoration and improvement: Parramatta St John's Cemetery, New South Wales, in its context 1788–c. 1840. The Antiquaries Journal, 100, 374–407. doi:10.1017/s0003581520000281
- Nikora, L. W., Masters-Awatere, B., & Te Awekotuku, N. (2012). Final arrangements following death: Maori indigenous decision making and tangi. Journal of Community & Applied Social Psychology, 22(5), 400–413. doi:10.1002/casp.2112
- Turnbull, P. (2017). Science, museums and collecting the Indigenous dead in colonial Australia. Palgrave Macmillan.
- Whitfield, J. T., Pako, W. H., & Alpers, M. P. (2024). Robert Hertz, anthropophagic practices and traditional South Fore mortuary rites in Papua New Guinea. Omega: Journal of Death and Dying, 93(1), 420–438. doi:10.1177/00302228241239210

== Religion ==
=== Ancient and classical religion ===
- Antonaccio, C. M. (1994). Contesting the past: Hero cult, tomb cult, and epic in early Greece. American Journal of Archaeology, 98(3), 389–410. JSTOR 506436
- Bloch-Smith, E. (1992). The cult of the dead in Judah: Interpreting the material remains. Journal of Biblical Literature, 111(2), 213. JSTOR 3267540
- Bremmer, J. N. (2002). The rise and fall of the afterlife: The 1995 Read-Tuckwell lectures at the University of Bristol. Routledge. doi:10.4324/9780203106228
- Graf, F., & Johnston, S. I. (2007). Ritual texts for the afterlife: Orpheus and the Bacchic gold tablets. Routledge.
- Johnston, S. I. (1999). Restless dead: Encounters between the living and the dead in ancient Greece. University of California Press. doi:10.1525/california/9780520217072.001.0001
- Katz, D. (2003). The image of the netherworld in the Sumerian sources. CDL Press.
- King, C. W. (2020). The ancient Roman afterlife: Di manes, belief, and the cult of the dead. University of Texas Press. doi:10.7560/320204
- Levenson, J. D. (2006). Resurrection and the restoration of Israel: The ultimate victory of the God of Life. Yale University Press. doi:10.12987/9780300135152
- Nickelsburg, G. W. E. (2006). Resurrection, immortality, and eternal life in intertestamental Judaism and early Christianity (expanded ed.). Harvard University Press.
- Ogden, D. (2001). Greek and Roman necromancy. Princeton University Press.
- Sayers, M. R. (2013). Feeding the dead: Ancestor worship in ancient India. Oxford University Press.
- Smith, M. (2017). Following Osiris: Perspectives on the Osirian afterlife from four millennia. Oxford University Press. doi:10.1093/acprof:oso/9780199582228.001.0001
- Whitley, J. (1988). Early states and hero cults: A re-appraisal. The Journal of Hellenic Studies, 108, 173–182. JSTOR 632638

=== Christianity ===
- Bartlett, R. (2013). Why can the dead do such great things? Saints and worshippers from the martyrs to the Reformation. Princeton University Press. doi:10.1515/9781400848782
- Brown, P. (1981). The cult of the saints: Its rise and function in Latin Christianity. University of Chicago Press. doi:10.7208/chicago/9780226076386.001.0001
- Brown, P. (2015). The ransom of the soul: Afterlife and wealth in early Western Christianity. Harvard University Press. doi:10.4159/9780674286504
- Constas, N. (2001). "To sleep, perchance to dream": The middle state of souls in patristic and Byzantine literature. Dumbarton Oaks Papers, 55, 91–124. JSTOR 1291814
- Daley, B. E. (1991). The hope of the early church: A handbook of patristic eschatology. Cambridge University Press.
- McDannell, C., & Lang, B. (1988). Heaven: A history. Yale University Press.
- Rebillard, É. (2009). The care of the dead in late antiquity (E. T. Rawlings & J. Routier-Pucci, Trans.). Cornell University Press. (Original work published 2003) doi:10.7591/9780801459160
- Yasin, A. M. (2005). Funerary monuments and collective identity: From Roman family to Christian community. The Art Bulletin, 87(3), 433–457. doi:10.1080/00043079.2005.10786254

==== Catholicism ====
- Duffy, E. (1992). The stripping of the altars: Traditional religion in England, 1400–1580. Yale University Press.
- Eire, C. M. N. (1995). From Madrid to purgatory: The art and craft of dying in sixteenth-century Spain. Cambridge University Press.
- Gray, M. (2020). Deathbed and burial rituals in late medieval Catholic Europe. In P. Booth & E. Tingle (Eds.), A companion to death, burial, and remembrance in late medieval and early modern Europe, c. 1300–1700 (pp. 106–131). Brill. doi:10.1163/9789004443433_005
- Greenblatt, S. (2001). Hamlet in purgatory. Princeton University Press.
- Kreider, A. (1979). English chantries: The road to dissolution. Harvard University Press.
- Pasulka, D. W. (2014). Heaven can wait: Purgatory in Catholic devotional and popular culture. Oxford University Press. doi:10.1093/acprof:oso/9780195382020.001.0001
- Strocchia, S. T. (1989). Remembering the family: Women, kin, and commemorative masses in Renaissance Florence. Renaissance Quarterly, 42(4), 635–654. JSTOR 2862275
- Terpstra, N. (Ed.). (2008). The art of executing well: Rituals of execution in Renaissance Italy. Truman State University Press.
- Tingle, E. C. (2012). Purgatory and piety in Brittany, 1480–1720. Ashgate.
- Will de Chaparro, M. (2007). Death and dying in New Mexico. University of New Mexico Press.
- Will de Chaparro, M., & Achim, M. (Eds.). (2011). Death and dying in colonial Spanish America. University of Arizona Press.

==== Protestantism ====
- Cressy, D. (1990). Death and the social order: The funerary preferences of Elizabethan gentlemen. Continuity and Change, 5(1), 99–119. doi:10.1017/s0268416000003891
- Eales, J., & Atherton, R. (2020). Funeral sermons and the Reformation: The British Isles and Germany. In P. Booth & E. Tingle (Eds.), A companion to death, burial, and remembrance in late medieval and early modern Europe, c. 1300–1700 (pp. 300–338). Brill. doi:10.1163/9789004443433_013
- Gordon, B., & Marshall, P. (Eds.). (2000). The place of the dead: Death and remembrance in late medieval and early modern Europe. Cambridge University Press.
- Karant-Nunn, S. C. (1997). The reformation of ritual: An interpretation of early modern Germany. Routledge.
- Raeburn, G. D. (2020). The Reformation of burial in the Protestant churches. In P. Booth & E. Tingle (Eds.), A companion to death, burial, and remembrance in late medieval and early modern Europe, c. 1300–1700 (pp. 156–174). Brill. doi:10.1163/9789004443433_007
- Riso, M. (2015). The narrative of the good death: The evangelical deathbed in Victorian England. Ashgate.
- Stannard, D. E. (1977). The Puritan way of death: A study in religion, culture, and social change. Oxford University Press.
- Tarlow, S. (2010). Ritual, belief and the dead in early modern Britain and Ireland. Cambridge University Press. doi:10.1017/cbo9780511778629
- Tingle, E. C., & Willis, J. (Eds.). (2016). Dying, death, burial and commemoration in Reformation Europe. Routledge. doi:10.4324/9781315578286

==== Eastern Orthodoxy ====
- Alexiou, M. (1974). The ritual lament in Greek tradition. Cambridge University Press.
- Constas, N. (2001). "To sleep, perchance to dream": The middle state of souls in patristic and Byzantine literature. Dumbarton Oaks Papers, 55, 91–124. JSTOR 1291814
- Dennis, G. T. (2001). Death in Byzantium. Dumbarton Oaks Papers, 55, 1–7. JSTOR 1291809
- Greene, R. H. (2010). Bodies like bright stars: Saints and relics in Orthodox Russia. Northern Illinois University Press.
- Kligman, G. (1988). The wedding of the dead: Ritual, poetics, and popular culture in Transylvania. University of California Press.
- Marinis, V. (2016). Death and the afterlife in Byzantium: The fate of the soul in theology, liturgy, and art. Cambridge University Press. doi:10.1017/9781316488850
- Melvani, N. (2018). The tombs of the Palaiologan emperors. Byzantine and Modern Greek Studies, 42(2), 237–260. doi:10.1017/byz.2018.7
- Merridale, C. (1996). Death and memory in modern Russia. History Workshop Journal, 42(1), 1–18. doi:10.1093/hwj/1996.42.1
- Merridale, C. (2000). Night of stone: Death and memory in twentieth-century Russia. Viking.
- Velkovska, E. (2001). Funeral rites according to the Byzantine liturgical sources. Dumbarton Oaks Papers, 55, 21–51. JSTOR 1291811

=== Islam ===
- Günther, S., & Lawson, T. (Eds.). (2017). Roads to paradise: Eschatology and concepts of the hereafter in Islam (Vols. 1–2). Brill.
- Halevi, L. (2004). The paradox of Islamization: Tombstone inscriptions, Qur'anic recitations, and the problem of religious change. History of Religions, 44(2), 120–152. doi:10.1086/429230
- Halevi, L. (2007). Muhammad's grave: Death rites and the making of Islamic society. Columbia University Press.
- Lange, C. (2016). Paradise and hell in Islamic traditions. Cambridge University Press. doi:10.1017/cbo9781139014847
- Lange, C. (Ed.). (2016). Locating hell in Islamic traditions. Brill. doi:10.1163/9789004301368
- Meri, J. W. (2010). Relics of piety and power in medieval Islam. Past & Present, 206(Supplement 5), 97–120. doi:10.1093/pastj/gtq014
- Petersen, A. (2013). The archaeology of death and burial in the Islamic world. In S. Tarlow & L. Nilsson Stutz (Eds.), The Oxford handbook of the archaeology of death and burial (pp. 241–258). Oxford University Press. doi:10.1093/oxfordhb/9780199569069.013.0014
- Rustomji, N. (2009). The garden and the fire: Heaven and hell in Islamic culture. Columbia University Press. doi:10.7312/rust14084
- Smith, J. I., & Haddad, Y. Y. (2002). The Islamic understanding of death and resurrection. Oxford University Press.

==== Sunni ====
- Beránek, O., & Ťupek, P. (2018). The temptation of graves in Salafi Islam: Iconoclasm, destruction and idolatry. Edinburgh University Press. doi:10.3366/edinburgh/9781474417570.001.0001
- Brand, M. (1993). Orthodoxy, innovation, and revival: Considerations of the past in imperial Mughal tomb architecture. Muqarnas, 10, 323–334. JSTOR 1523197
- Halevi, L. (2004). Wailing for the dead: The role of women in early Islamic funerals. Past & Present, 183(1), 3–39. doi:10.1093/past/183.1.3
- Koch, E. (2006). The complete Taj Mahal and the riverfront gardens of Agra. Thames & Hudson.
- Leisten, T. (1990). Between orthodoxy and exegesis: Some aspects of attitudes in the Shari'a toward funerary architecture. Muqarnas, 7, 12–22. JSTOR 1523118
- Meri, J. W. (2002). The cult of saints among Muslims and Jews in medieval Syria. Oxford University Press.
- Mulder, S. (2014). The shrines of the 'Alids in medieval Syria: Sunnis, Shi'is and the architecture of coexistence. Edinburgh University Press.
- Taylor, C. S. (1992). Reevaluating the Shi'i role in the development of monumental Islamic funerary architecture: The case of Egypt. Muqarnas, 9, 1–10. JSTOR 1523131
- Taylor, C. S. (1999). In the vicinity of the righteous: Ziyara and the veneration of Muslim saints in late medieval Egypt. Brill. doi:10.1163/9789004492721

==== Shia ====
- Aghaie, K. S. (2004). The martyrs of Karbala: Shi'i symbols and rituals in modern Iran. University of Washington Press.
- Ayoub, M. M. (1978). Redemptive suffering in Islam: A study of the devotional aspects of Ashura in Twelver Shi'ism. Mouton.
- Chelkowski, P. J. (Ed.). (1979). Ta'ziyeh: Ritual and drama in Iran. New York University Press.
- Ende, W. (1978). The flagellations of Muharram and the Shi'ite 'ulama'. Der Islam, 55(1). doi:10.1515/islm.1978.55.1.19
- Hyder, S. A. (2006). Reliving Karbala: Martyrdom in South Asian memory. Oxford University Press.
- Nakash, Y. (1993). An attempt to trace the origin of the rituals of Ashura. Die Welt des Islams, 33(2), 161–181. doi:10.1163/157006093x00063
- Rahimi, B. (2012). Theater state and the formation of early modern public sphere in Iran: Studies on Safavid Muharram rituals, 1590–1641 CE. Brill. doi:10.1163/9789004207561

=== Judaism ===
- Amanik, A. (2019). Dust to dust: A history of Jewish death and burial in New York. New York University Press.
- Goldberg, S. A. (1996). Crossing the Jabbok: Illness and death in Ashkenazi Judaism in sixteenth- through nineteenth-century Prague (C. Cosman, Trans.). University of California Press.
- Greenblatt, R. L. (2008). Jewish memory and local history: A commemorative liturgy from early modern Prague. Jewish Culture and History, 10(2–3), 159–171. doi:10.1080/1462169x.2008.10512105
- Hachlili, R. (2005). Jewish funerary customs, practices and rites in the Second Temple period. Brill.
- Kaplan, D. (2024). Regulating emotion: Burial and mourning of children in early modern Ashkenaz. Jewish Social Studies, 29(1), 1–31. doi:10.2979/jss.00001
- Kraemer, D. (2002). The meanings of death in rabbinic Judaism. Routledge.
- McComish, J. (2000). The medieval Jewish cemetery at Jewbury, York. Jewish Culture and History, 3(2), 21–30. doi:10.1080/1462169x.2000.10512218
- Olyan, S. M. (2004). Biblical mourning: Ritual and social dimensions. Oxford University Press. doi:10.1093/acprof:oso/9780199264865.001.0001
- Reif, S. C., Lehnardt, A., & Bar-Levav, A. (Eds.). (2014). Death in Jewish life: Burial and mourning customs among Jews of Europe and nearby communities. De Gruyter. doi:10.1515/9783110339185
- Suriano, M. J. (2018). A history of death in the Hebrew Bible. Oxford University Press.

=== Hinduism ===
- Atwal, J. (2013). 'Foul unhallow'd fires': Officiating sati and the colonial Hindu widow in the United Provinces. Studies in History, 29(2), 229–272. doi:10.1177/0257643013504654
- Davis, R. H. (1988). Cremation and liberation: The revision of a Hindu ritual. History of Religions, 28(1), 37–53. doi:10.1086/463135
- Firth, S. (1996). The good death: Attitudes of British Hindus. In P. C. Jupp & G. Howarth (Eds.), Contemporary issues in the sociology of death, dying and disposal (pp. 96–107). Macmillan. doi:10.1007/978-1-349-24303-7_8
- Justice, C. (1997). Dying the good death: The pilgrimage to die in India's holy city. State University of New York Press.
- Kaushik, M. (1976). The symbolic representation of death. Contributions to Indian Sociology, 10(2), 265–292. doi:10.1177/006996677601000204
- Major, A. (2006). Pious flames: European encounters with sati, 1500–1830. Oxford University Press.
- Mani, L. (1998). Contentious traditions: The debate on sati in colonial India. University of California Press.
- Mines, D. P. (1989). Hindu periods of death 'impurity'. Contributions to Indian Sociology, 23(1), 103–130. doi:10.1177/006996689023001007
- Parry, J. P. (1994). Death in Banaras. Cambridge University Press.
- Sayers, M. R. (2013). Feeding the dead: Ancestor worship in ancient India. Oxford University Press.
- Weinberger-Thomas, C. (1999). Ashes of immortality: Widow-burning in India (J. Mehlman & D. G. White, Trans.). University of Chicago Press. (Original work published 1996)
- Yang, A. A. (1989). Whose sati? Widow burning in early 19th century India. Journal of Women's History, 1(2), 8–33. doi:10.1353/jowh.2010.0003

=== Buddhism ===
- Benn, J. A. (2007). Burning for the Buddha: Self-immolation in Chinese Buddhism. University of Hawai'i Press.
- Cuevas, B. J. (2003). The hidden history of the Tibetan Book of the Dead. Oxford University Press.
- Cuevas, B. J., & Stone, J. I. (Eds.). (2017). The Buddhist dead: Practices, discourses, representations. University of Hawaii Press.
- Fujii, M. (1983). Maintenance and change in Japanese traditional funerals and death-related behavior. Japanese Journal of Religious Studies, 10(1), 39–64. doi:10.18874/jjrs.10.1.1983.39-64
- Gerhart, K. M. (2009). The material culture of death in medieval Japan. University of Hawai'i Press. doi:10.21313/hawaii/9780824832612.001.0001
- Gouin, M. (2010). Tibetan rituals of death: Buddhist funerary practices. Routledge.
- Lopez, D. S. (2011). The Tibetan Book of the Dead: A biography. Princeton University Press. doi:10.1515/9781400838042
- Rowe, M. (2000). Stickers for nails: The ongoing transformation of roles, rites, and symbols in Japanese funerals. Japanese Journal of Religious Studies, 27(3–4), 353–378. doi:10.18874/jjrs.27.3-4.2000.353-378
- Rowe, M. M. (2011). Bonds of the dead: Temples, burial, and the transformation of contemporary Japanese Buddhism. University of Chicago Press.
- Schopen, G. (1997). Bones, stones, and Buddhist monks: Collected papers on the archaeology, epigraphy, and texts of monastic Buddhism in India. University of Hawai'i Press.
- Sharf, R. H. (1992). The idolization of enlightenment: On the mummification of Ch'an masters in medieval China. History of Religions, 32(1), 1–31. doi:10.1086/463304
- Stone, J. I., & Walter, M. N. (Eds.). (2008). Death and the afterlife in Japanese Buddhism. University of Hawai'i Press.
- Strong, J. S. (2004). Relics of the Buddha. Princeton University Press.
- Teiser, S. F. (1994). The scripture on the ten kings and the making of purgatory in medieval Chinese Buddhism. University of Hawaii Press. doi:10.1515/9780824846541
- Williams, P., & Ladwig, P. (Eds.). (2012). Buddhist funeral cultures of Southeast Asia and China. Cambridge University Press. doi:10.1017/cbo9780511782251

=== Chinese religions and ancestor veneration ===
- Brashier, K. E. (2011). Ancestral memory in early China. Harvard University Asia Center.
- Ebrey, P. B. (1990). Cremation in Sung China. The American Historical Review, 95(2), 406–428. doi:10.1086/ahr/95.2.406
- Ebrey, P. B. (1991). Confucianism and family rituals in imperial China: A social history of writing about rites. Princeton University Press.
- Harrell, S. (1979). The concept of soul in Chinese folk religion. The Journal of Asian Studies, 38(3), 519–528. doi:10.1017/s002191180014104x
- Janelli, R. L., & Janelli, D. Y. (1982). Ancestor worship and Korean society. Stanford University Press.
- Kwon, H. (2008). Ghosts of war in Vietnam. Cambridge University Press.
- Park, C.-W. (2010). Cultural blending in Korean death rites: New interpretive approaches. Continuum.
- Teiser, S. F. (1988). The ghost festival in medieval China. Princeton University Press.
- Yu, Y.-S. (1987). "O soul, come back!" A study in the changing conceptions of the soul and afterlife in pre-Buddhist China. Harvard Journal of Asiatic Studies, 47(2), 363. JSTOR 2719187

=== Indigenous religions ===
- Glaskin, K., Tonkinson, M., Musharbash, Y., & Burbank, V. (Eds.). (2008). Mortality, mourning and mortuary practices in Indigenous Australia. Ashgate.
- Jindra, M. (2005). Christianity and the proliferation of ancestors: Changes in hierarchy and mortuary ritual in the Cameroon Grassfields. Africa, 75(3), 356–377. doi:10.3366/afr.2005.75.3.356
- Jindra, M., & Noret, J. (Eds.). (2011). Funerals in Africa: Explorations of a social phenomenon. Berghahn Books. doi:10.3167/9780857452054
- Kan, S. (1989). Symbolic immortality: The Tlingit potlatch of the nineteenth century. Smithsonian Institution Press.
- Kan, S. (1999). Memory eternal: Tlingit culture and Russian Orthodox Christianity through two centuries. University of Washington Press.
- Keesing, H. (1970). Death, property, and the ancestors: A reconsideration of Goody's concepts. Africa, 40(1), 40–49. JSTOR 1157567
- Larson, P. M. (2001). Austronesian mortuary ritual in history: Transformations of secondary burial (famadihana) in highland Madagascar. Ethnohistory, 48(1–2), 123–155. doi:10.1215/00141801-48-1-2-123
- Lee, R., & Vaughan, M. (2008). Death and dying in the history of Africa since 1800. The Journal of African History, 49(3), 341–359. doi:10.1017/S0021853708003952
- Mills, A., & Slobodin, R. (Eds.). (1994). Amerindian rebirth: Reincarnation belief among North American Indians and Inuit. University of Toronto Press.

=== Secular and non-religious death ===
- Ben-Amos, A. (2000). Funerals, politics, and memory in modern France, 1789–1996. Oxford University Press. doi:10.1093/acprof:oso/9780198203285.001.0001
- Engelke, M. (2015). The coffin question: Death and materiality in humanist funerals. Material Religion, 11(1), 26–48. doi:10.2752/205393215X14259900061553
- Jupp, P. C. (2006). From dust to ashes: Cremation and the British way of death. Palgrave Macmillan.
- Kselman, T. A. (1988). Funeral conflicts in nineteenth-century France. Comparative Studies in Society and History, 30(2), 312–332. doi:10.1017/s0010417500015218
- Kselman, T. A. (1993). Death and the afterlife in modern France. Princeton University Press.
- McManners, J. (1981). Death and the Enlightenment: Changing attitudes to death among Christians and unbelievers in eighteenth-century France. Clarendon Press.
- Merridale, C. (2000). Night of stone: Death and memory in twentieth-century Russia. Viking.
- Walter, T. (2005). Three ways to arrange a funeral: Mortuary variation in the modern West. Mortality, 10(3), 173–192. doi:10.1080/13576270500178369

== History of dying ==
- Appleford, A. (2015). Learning to die in London, 1380–1540. University of Pennsylvania Press. doi:10.9783/9780812290479
- Cross, C. (1985). The Third Earl of Huntingdon's death-bed: A Calvinist example of the ars moriendi. Northern History, 21(1), 80–107. doi:10.1179/007817285790176147
- Green, J. W. (2008). Beyond the good death: The anthropology of modern dying. University of Pennsylvania Press. doi:10.9783/9780812202076
- McManners, J. (1981). Death and the Enlightenment: Changing attitudes to death among Christians and unbelievers in eighteenth-century France. Clarendon Press.
- Merrick, J. (2008). Louis XV's deathbed apology. European History Quarterly, 38(2), 205–226. doi:10.1177/0265691408091240
- Reinis, A. (2007). Reforming the art of dying: The ars moriendi in the German Reformation (1519–1528). Ashgate.
- Stannard, D. E. (1977). The Puritan way of death: A study in religion, culture, and social change. Oxford University Press.
- Stone, J. I. (2016). Right thoughts at the last moment: Buddhism and deathbed practices in early medieval Japan. University of Hawai'i Press. doi:10.21313/hawaii/9780824856434.001.0001
- Tercier, J. A. (2005). The contemporary deathbed: The ultimate rush. Palgrave Macmillan. doi:10.1057/9780230514058
- Walter, T. (2003). Historical and cultural variants on the good death. BMJ, 327(7408), 218–220. doi:10.1136/bmj.327.7408.218

== Defining death ==
- Behlmer, G. K. (2003). Grave doubts: Victorian medicine, moral panic, and the signs of death. Journal of British Studies, 42(2), 206–235. doi:10.1086/345608
- Bondeson, J. (2001). Buried alive: The terrifying history of our most primal fear. W. W. Norton.

== Treatment of the dead ==
=== Burial grounds and cemeteries ===
- Clayden, A., Green, T., Hockey, J., & Powell, M. (2014). Natural burial: Landscape, practice and experience. Routledge. doi:10.4324/9781315771694
- Etlin, R. A. (1984). The architecture of death: The transformation of the cemetery in eighteenth-century Paris. MIT Press.
- Francis, D., Kellaher, L., & Neophytou, G. (2005). The secret cemetery. Berg.
- Hotz, M. E. (2001). Down among the dead: Edwin Chadwick's burial reform discourse in mid-nineteenth-century England. Victorian Literature and Culture, 29(1), 21–38. doi:10.1017/s1060150301291025
- Linden-Ward, B. (1989). Silent city on a hill: Landscapes of memory and Boston's Mount Auburn Cemetery. Ohio State University Press.
- Niell, P. (2011). Classical architecture and the cultural politics of cemetery reform in early nineteenth-century Havana, Cuba. The Latin Americanist, 55(2), 57–89. doi:10.1353/tla.2011.a706503
- Rugg, J. (2013). Churchyard and cemetery: Tradition and modernity in rural North Yorkshire. Manchester University Press.
- Rumble, H., & Davies, D. J. (2012). Natural burial: Traditional-secular spiritualities and funeral innovation. Continuum.
- Sachs, A. (2010). American Arcadia: Mount Auburn Cemetery and the nineteenth-century landscape tradition. Environmental History, 15(2), 206–235. doi:10.1093/envhis/emq032
- Sloane, D. C. (1991). The last great necessity: Cemeteries in American history. Johns Hopkins University Press.

=== Cremation ===
- Cerezo-Román, J. I., Wessman, A., & Williams, H. (Eds.). (2017). Cremation and the archaeology of death. Oxford University Press. doi:10.1093/oso/9780198798118.001.0001
- Grainger, H. J. (2005). Death redesigned: British crematoria, history, architecture and landscape. Spire Books.
- Grainger, H. J. (2020). Designs on death: The architecture of Scottish crematoria. John Donald.
- Jupp, P. C. (2006). From dust to ashes: Cremation and the British way of death. Palgrave Macmillan.
- Knight, F. (2018). Cremation and Christianity: English Anglican and Roman Catholic attitudes to cremation since 1885. Mortality, 23(4), 301–319. doi:10.1080/13576275.2017.1382460
- Kuijt, I., Quinn, C. P., & Cooney, G. (Eds.). (2014). Transformation by fire: The archaeology of cremation in cultural context. University of Arizona Press.
- Mathijssen, B. (2017). The ambiguity of human ashes: Exploring encounters with cremated remains in the Netherlands. Death Studies, 41(1), 34–41. doi:10.1080/07481187.2016.1257882
- Parsons, B. (2005). Committed to the cleansing flame: The development of cremation in nineteenth-century England. Spire Books.
- Prothero, S. (2001). Purified by fire: A history of cremation in America. University of California Press.
- White, S. (2002). A burial ahead of its time? The Crookenden burial case and the sanctioning of cremation in England and Wales. Mortality, 7(2), 171–190. doi:10.1080/13576270220136285

=== Embalming and preservation ===
- Aufderheide, A. C. (2003). The scientific study of mummies. Cambridge University Press.
- Carol, A. (2019). Embalming and the materiality of death (France, nineteenth century). Mortality, 24(2), 183–192. doi:10.1080/13576275.2019.1585784
- Giles, M. (2009). Iron Age bog bodies of north-western Europe: Representing the dead. Archaeological Dialogues, 16(1), 75–101. doi:10.1017/s1380203809002815
- Giles, M. (2020). Bog bodies: Face to face with the past. Manchester University Press. doi:10.7765/9781526150196
- Heaney, C. (2023). Empires of the dead: Inca mummies and the Peruvian ancestors of American anthropology. Oxford University Press. doi:10.1093/oso/9780197542552.001.0001
- Loynes, R. (2015). Prepared for eternity: A study of human embalming techniques in ancient Egypt using computerised tomography scans of mummies. Archaeopress. JSTOR j.ctv177tj77
- Park, K. (1995). The life of the corpse: Division and dissection in late medieval Europe. Journal of the History of Medicine and Allied Sciences, 50(1), 111–132. doi:10.1093/jhmas/50.1.111
- Sanders, K. (2009). Bodies in the bog and the archaeological imagination. University of Chicago Press.
- Yurchak, A. (2015). Bodies of Lenin. Representations, 129(1), 116–157. doi:10.1525/rep.2015.129.1.116

=== Exhumation, reburial and repatriation ===
- Colwell, C. (2017). Plundered skulls and stolen spirits: Inside the fight to reclaim Native America's culture. University of Chicago Press.
- Curtis, N. G. W. (2010). Repatriation from Scottish museums: Learning from NAGPRA. Museum Anthropology, 33(2), 234–248. doi:10.1111/j.1548-1379.2010.01101.x
- Ferrándiz, F., & Robben, A. C. G. M. (Eds.). (2015). Necropolitics: Mass graves and exhumations in the age of human rights. University of Pennsylvania Press. doi:10.9783/9780812291322
- Fforde, C., Hubert, J., & Turnbull, P. (Eds.). (2002). The dead and their possessions: Repatriation in principle, policy and practice. Routledge.
- Fine-Dare, K. S. (2002). Grave injustice: The American Indian repatriation movement and NAGPRA. University of Nebraska Press.
- Redman, S. J. (2016). Bone rooms: From scientific racism to human prehistory in museums. Harvard University Press. doi:10.4159/9780674969711
- Seidemann, R. M. (2010). NAGPRA at 20: What have the states done to expand human remains protections? Museum Anthropology, 33(2), 199–209. doi:10.1111/j.1548-1379.2010.01098.x
- Thomas, D. H. (2000). Skull wars: Kennewick Man, archaeology, and the battle for Native American identity. Basic Books.
- Verdery, K. (1999). The political lives of dead bodies: Reburial and postsocialist change. Columbia University Press.
- Wallis, R. J., & Blain, J. (2011). From respect to reburial: Negotiating pagan interest in prehistoric human remains in Britain, through the Avebury consultation. Public Archaeology, 10(1), 23–45. doi:10.1179/175355311x12991501673186

== Funerary ritual and the funeral trade ==
- Farrell, J. J. (1980). Inventing the American way of death, 1830–1920. Temple University Press.
- Fritz, P. S. (1994). The undertaking trade in England: Its origins and early development, 1660–1830. Eighteenth-Century Studies, 28(2), 241. JSTOR 2739202
- Laderman, G. (2003). Rest in peace: A cultural history of death and the funeral home in twentieth-century America. Oxford University Press.
- Laqueur, T. W. (1983). Bodies, death, and pauper funerals. Representations, 1(1), 109–131. doi:10.1525/rep.1983.1.1.99p0385r
- Litten, J. (1991). The English way of death: The common funeral since 1450. Robert Hale.
- Mitford, J. (2000). The American way of death revisited. Vintage.
- Parsons, B. (2018). The evolution of the British funeral industry in the 20th century: From undertaker to funeral director. Emerald Publishing. doi:10.1108/9781787436299
- Poulter, G. (2012). What's traditional about "the traditional funeral"? Funeral rituals and the evolution of the funeral industry in Nova Scotia. Journal of the Canadian Historical Association, 22(1), 133–159. doi:10.7202/1008960ar
- Suzuki, H. (2002). The price of death: The funeral industry in contemporary Japan. Stanford University Press.

== Mass death ==
=== Epidemics and plague ===
- Burrell, S., & Gill, G. (2005). The Liverpool cholera epidemic of 1832 and anatomical dissection—medical mistrust and civil unrest. Journal of the History of Medicine and Allied Sciences, 60(4), 478–498. doi:10.1093/jhmas/jri061
- Capozzola, C. (2002). A very American epidemic: Memory politics and identity politics in the AIDS Memorial Quilt, 1985–1993. Radical History Review, 2002(82), 91–109. doi:10.1215/01636545-2002-82-91

=== Famine ===
- Mark-FitzGerald, E. (2013). Commemorating the Irish Famine: Memory and the monument. Liverpool University Press. doi:10.5949/liverpool/9781846318986.001.0001

=== War and military commemoration ===
- Barrett, M. (2007). Subalterns at war: First World War colonial forces and the politics of the Imperial War Graves Commission. Interventions, 9(3), 451–474. doi:10.1080/13698010701618703
- Budreau, L. M. (2010). Bodies of war: World War I and the politics of commemoration in America, 1919–1933. New York University Press. doi:10.18574/nyu/9780814789803.001.0001
- Capdevila, L., & Voldman, D. (2006). War dead: Western societies and the casualties of war. Edinburgh University Press.
- Faust, D. G. (2008). This republic of suffering: Death and the American Civil War. Alfred A. Knopf.
- Grant, S.-M. (2005). Raising the dead: War, memory and American national identity. Nations and Nationalism, 11(4), 509–529. doi:10.1111/j.1469-8129.2005.00217.x
- Iles, J. (2008). In remembrance: The Flanders poppy. Mortality, 13(3), 201–221. doi:10.1080/13576270802181640
- King, A. (1998). Memorials of the Great War in Britain: The symbolism and politics of remembrance. Berg.
- Mosse, G. L. (1990). Fallen soldiers: Reshaping the memory of the world wars. Oxford University Press.
- Neff, J. R. (2005). Honoring the Civil War dead: Commemoration and the problem of reconciliation. University Press of Kansas.
- Scates, B. (2006). Return to Gallipoli: Walking the battlefields of the Great War. Cambridge University Press.
- Sherman, D. J. (1998). Bodies and names: The emergence of commemoration in interwar France. The American Historical Review, 103(2), 443–466. doi:10.1086/ahr/103.2.443
- Tradii, L. (2019). 'Their dear remains belong to us alone' Soldiers' bodies, commemoration, and cultural responses to exhumations after the Great War. First World War Studies, 10(2–3), 245–261. doi:10.1080/19475020.2020.1779777
- Trout, S. (2010). On the battlefield of memory: The First World War and American remembrance, 1919–1941. University of Alabama Press.
- Wilson, R. (2012). The burial of the dead: The British Army on the Western Front, 1914–18. War & Society, 31(1), 22–41. doi:10.1179/204243411x13201386799136
- Winter, J. (1995). Sites of memory, sites of mourning: The Great War in European cultural history. Cambridge University Press.
- Wittman, L. (2011). The tomb of the unknown soldier, modern mourning, and the reinvention of the mystical body. University of Toronto Press. doi:10.3138/9781442696006

=== Genocide and mass graves ===
- Anstett, É., & Dreyfus, J.-M. (Eds.). (2014). Destruction and human remains: Disposal and concealment in genocide and mass violence. Manchester University Press. doi:10.7228/manchester/9780719096020.001.0001
- Crossland, Z. (2000). Buried lives: Forensic archaeology and the disappeared in Argentina. Archaeological Dialogues, 7(2), 146–159. doi:10.1017/s1380203800001707
- Ferrándiz, F., & Robben, A. C. G. M. (Eds.). (2015). Necropolitics: Mass graves and exhumations in the age of human rights. University of Pennsylvania Press. doi:10.9783/9780812291322
- Ibreck, R. (2010). The politics of mourning: Survivor contributions to memorials in post-genocide Rwanda. Memory Studies, 3(4), 330–343. doi:10.1177/1750698010374921
- Korman, R. (2015). Mobilising the dead? The place of bones and corpses in the commemoration of the Tutsi genocide in Rwanda. Human Remains and Violence: An Interdisciplinary Journal, 1(2), 56–70. doi:10.7227/hrv.1.2.6
- Marcuse, H. (2001). Legacies of Dachau: The uses and abuses of a concentration camp, 1933–2001. Cambridge University Press.
- Moon, C. (2013). Interpreters of the dead. Social & Legal Studies, 22(2), 149–169. doi:10.1177/0964663912463724
- Renshaw, L. (2011). Exhuming loss: Memory, materiality and mass graves of the Spanish Civil War. Left Coast Press.
- Rojas-Pérez, I. (2017). Mourning remains: State atrocity, exhumations, and governing the disappeared in Peru's postwar Andes. Stanford University Press. doi:10.1515/9781503602632
- Rosenblatt, A. (2015). Digging for the disappeared: Forensic science after atrocity. Stanford University Press.
- Sanford, V. (2003). Buried secrets: Truth and human rights in Guatemala. Palgrave Macmillan. doi:10.1057/9781403973375
- Stover, E., & Ryan, M. (2001). Breaking bread with the dead. Historical Archaeology, 35(1), 7–25. doi:10.1007/bf03374523
- Sturdy Colls, C. (2015). Holocaust archaeologies: Approaches and future directions. Springer. doi:10.1007/978-3-319-10641-0
- Wagner, S. E. (2008). To know where he lies: DNA technology and the search for Srebrenica's missing. University of California Press. doi:10.1525/9780520942622

=== Slavery and colonial mortality ===
- Brown, V. (2008). The reaper's garden: Death and power in the world of Atlantic slavery. Harvard University Press.
- Handler, J. S. (1997). An African-type healer/diviner and his grave goods: A burial from a plantation slave cemetery in Barbados, West Indies. International Journal of Historical Archaeology, 1(2), 91–130. doi:10.1023/a:1027355822317
- Jamieson, R. W. (1995). Material culture and social death: African-American burial practices. Historical Archaeology, 29(4), 39–58. doi:10.1007/bf03374216
- LaRoche, C. J., & Blakey, M. L. (1997). Seizing intellectual power: The dialogue at the New York African Burial Ground. Historical Archaeology, 31(3), 84–106. doi:10.1007/bf03374233
- Rainville, L. (2014). Hidden history: African American cemeteries in central Virginia. University of Virginia Press.

== Death and the law ==
- Burgess, C. (1987). 'By quick and by dead': Wills and pious provision in late medieval Bristol. The English Historical Review, CII(405), 837–858. doi:10.1093/ehr/cii.405.837
- Burgess, C., & Kümin, B. (1993). Penitential bequests and parish regimes in late medieval England. The Journal of Ecclesiastical History, 44(4), 610–630. doi:10.1017/s0022046900077824
- Lambert, M. (2014). Death and memory: Clothing bequests in English wills 1650–1830. Costume, 48(1), 46–59. doi:10.1179/0590887613z.00000000037

== Anatomy, dissection and body-snatching ==
- Fabian, A. (2010). The skull collectors: Race, science, and America's unburied dead. University of Chicago Press. doi:10.7208/chicago/9780226233499.001.0001
- Hurren, E. T. (2012). Dying for Victorian medicine: English anatomy and its trade in the dead poor, c. 1834–1929. Palgrave Macmillan. doi:10.1057/9780230355651
- Hurren, E. T. (2016). Dissecting the criminal corpse. Palgrave Macmillan. doi:10.1057/978-1-137-58249-2
- Jenkins, T. (2010). Contesting human remains in museum collections. Routledge. doi:10.4324/9780203841310
- MacDonald, H. (2006). Human remains: Dissection and its histories. Yale University Press.
- Mitchell, P. D., Boston, C., Chamberlain, A. T., Chaplin, S., Chauhan, V., Evans, J., Fowler, L., Powers, N., Walker, D., Webb, H., & Witkin, A. (2011). The study of anatomy in England from 1700 to the early 20th century. Journal of Anatomy, 219(2), 91–99. doi:10.1111/j.1469-7580.2011.01381.x
- Redman, S. J. (2016). Bone rooms: From scientific racism to human prehistory in museums. Harvard University Press. doi:10.4159/9780674969711
- Sappol, M. (2002). A traffic of dead bodies: Anatomy and embodied social identity in nineteenth-century America. Princeton University Press.
- Ward, R. (2015). The criminal corpse, anatomists, and the criminal law: Parliamentary attempts to extend the dissection of offenders in late eighteenth-century England. Journal of British Studies, 54(1), 63–87. doi:10.1017/jbr.2014.167

== Grief, mourning and memorialization ==
=== Grief and bereavement ===
- Acton, C. (2007). Grief in wartime: Private pain, public discourse. Palgrave Macmillan. doi:10.1057/9780230801431
- Damousi, J. (1999). The labour of loss: Mourning, memory and wartime bereavement in Australia. Cambridge University Press. doi:10.1017/cbo9780511552335
- Jalland, P. (2010). Death in war and peace: A history of loss and grief in England, 1914–1970. Oxford University Press.
- Noakes, L. (2020). Dying for the nation: Death, grief and bereavement in Second World War Britain. Manchester University Press. doi:10.7765/9781526135650
- Strange, J.-M. (2002). 'She cried a very little': Death, grief and mourning in working-class culture, c. 1880–1914. Social History, 27(2), 143–161. doi:10.1080/03071020210128373

=== Mourning customs and dress ===
- Bedikian, S. A. (2008). The death of mourning: From Victorian crepe to the little black dress. Omega: Journal of Death and Dying, 57(1), 35–52. doi:10.2190/om.57.1.c
- Gorer, G. (1987). Death, grief, and mourning in contemporary Britain. Ayer Company Publishers.
- Hodes, M. (2015). Mourning Lincoln. Yale University Press.
- Nouvian, M. (2018). Defiant mourning: Public funerals as funeral demonstrations in the Chartist movement. Journal of Victorian Culture, 24(2), 208–226. doi:10.1093/jvcult/vcy059
- Sinnema, P. (2000). Anxiously managing mourning: Wellington's funeral and the press. Victorian Review, 25(2), 30–60. doi:10.1353/vcr.2000.0030
- Strocchia, S. T. (1992). Death and ritual in Renaissance Florence. Johns Hopkins University Press.
- Taylor, L. (1983). Mourning dress: A costume and social history. George Allen & Unwin.
- Warner, P. C. (1986). Mourning and memorial jewelry of the Victorian age. Dress, 12(1), 55–60. doi:10.1179/036121186803657472
- Wehrle, L., & Paoletti, J. (1990). What do we wear to the wedding now that the funeral is over? A look at advice and etiquette literature, and practice during the years 1880–1910 in America. Dress, 16(1), 81–88. doi:10.1179/036121190805298500

=== Monuments and commemoration ===
- Doss, E. (2010). Memorial mania: Public feeling in America. University of Chicago Press.
- Mosse, G. L. (1990). Fallen soldiers: Reshaping the memory of the world wars. Oxford University Press.
- Savage, K. (1997). Standing soldiers, kneeling slaves: Race, war, and monument in nineteenth-century America. Princeton University Press.
- Sturken, M. (1997). Tangled memories: The Vietnam War, the AIDS epidemic, and the politics of remembering. University of California Press.
- Wagner-Pacifici, R., & Schwartz, B. (1991). The Vietnam Veterans Memorial: Commemorating a difficult past. American Journal of Sociology, 97(2), 376–420. doi:10.1086/229783
- Young, J. E. (1993). The texture of memory: Holocaust memorials and meaning. Yale University Press.

== Afterlife ==
=== Heaven, hell and purgatory ===
- Bernstein, A. E. (1993). The formation of hell: Death and retribution in the ancient and early Christian worlds. Cornell University Press.
- Casey, J. (2009). After lives: A guide to heaven, hell, and purgatory. Oxford University Press. doi:10.1093/acprof:oso/9780195092950.001.0001
- Ehrman, B. D. (2022). Journeys to heaven and hell: Tours of the afterlife in the early Christian tradition. Yale University Press. doi:10.12987/9780300265163
- Greenblatt, S. (2001). Hamlet in purgatory. Princeton University Press.
- Le Goff, J. (1984). The birth of purgatory (A. Goldhammer, Trans.). University of Chicago Press. (Original work published 1981)
- Moreira, I. (2010). Heaven's purge: Purgatory in late antiquity. Oxford University Press.
- Pasulka, D. W. (2014). Heaven can wait: Purgatory in Catholic devotional and popular culture. Oxford University Press. doi:10.1093/acprof:oso/9780195382020.001.0001
- Perry, M. J. (2017). Jewish heaven, Christian hell: Rabbi Joshua ben Levi's vision of the afterlife. Journal of Medieval History, 43(2), 212–227. doi:10.1080/03044181.2017.1285520
- Watkins, C. (2002). Sin, penance and purgatory in the Anglo-Norman realm: The evidence of visions and ghost stories. Past & Present, 175(1), 3–33. doi:10.1093/past/175.1.3
- Weaver, H. (2021). A pilgrimage to purgatory. Journal of Medieval and Early Modern Studies, 51(1), 9–35. doi:10.1215/10829636-8796222

=== Ghosts ===
- Caciola, N. (1996). Wraiths, revenants and ritual in medieval culture. Past & Present, 152(1), 3–45. doi:10.1093/past/152.1.3
- Davies, O. (2007). The haunted: A social history of ghosts. Palgrave Macmillan.
- Schmitt, J.-C. (1998). Ghosts in the Middle Ages: The living and the dead in medieval society (T. L. Fagan, Trans.). University of Chicago Press.

== Miscellaneous ==
- Cherryson, A., Crossland, Z., & Tarlow, S. (2012). A fine and private place: The archaeology of death and burial in post-medieval Britain and Ireland. University of Leicester.
- Gerhart, K. M. (2009). The material culture of death in medieval Japan. University of Hawai'i Press. doi:10.21313/hawaii/9780824832612.001.0001
- Gibson, M. (2004). Melancholy objects. Mortality, 9(4), 285–299. doi:10.1080/13576270412331329812
- Gilchrist, R. (2008). Magic for the dead? The archaeology of magic in later medieval burials. Medieval Archaeology, 52(1), 119–159. doi:10.1179/174581708x335468
- Hallam, E., & Hockey, J. (2001). Death, memory and material culture. Routledge.
- Hockey, J., Komaromy, C., & Woodthorpe, K. (Eds.). (2010). The matter of death: Space, place and materiality. Palgrave Macmillan.
- Litten, J. (1991). The English way of death: The common funeral since 1450. Robert Hale.
- Walsham, A. (2010). Introduction: Relics and remains. Past & Present, 206(Supplement 5), 9–36. doi:10.1093/pastj/gtq026
- Williams, H. (2004). Death warmed up: The agency of bodies and bones in early Anglo-Saxon cremation rites. Journal of Material Culture, 9(3), 263–291. doi:10.1177/1359183504046894
- Williams, H. (Ed.). (2003). Archaeologies of remembrance: Death and memory in past societies. Kluwer Academic/Plenum Publishers. doi:10.1007/978-1-4419-9222-2

=== Tombs and gravestones ===
- Baugher, S., & Veit, R. F. (2014). The archaeology of American cemeteries and gravemarkers. University Press of Florida.
- Cannon, A. (1989). The historical dimension in mortuary expressions of status and sentiment. Current Anthropology, 30(4), 437–458. doi:10.1086/203764
- Colvin, H. (1991). Architecture and the after-life. Yale University Press.
- Dethlefsen, E., & Deetz, J. (1966). Death's heads, cherubs, and willow trees: Experimental archaeology in colonial cemeteries. American Antiquity, 31(4), 502–510. JSTOR 2694382
- Llewellyn, N. (2000). Funeral monuments in post-Reformation England. Cambridge University Press.
- Ludwig, A. I. (1966). Graven images: New England stonecarving and its symbols, 1650–1815. Wesleyan University Press.
- Mytum, H. (2006). Popular attitudes to memory, the body, and social identity: The rise of external commemoration in Britain, Ireland and New England. Post-Medieval Archaeology, 40(1), 96–110. doi:10.1179/174581306x143061
- Saul, N. (2001). Death, art, and memory in medieval England: The Cobham family and their monuments, 1300–1500. Oxford University Press.
- Sherlock, P. (2008). Monuments and memory in early modern England. Ashgate.
- Tarlow, S. (1999). Bereavement and commemoration: An archaeology of mortality. Blackwell.

=== Art ===
- Ariès, P. (1985). Images of man and death (J. Lloyd, Trans.). Harvard University Press.
- Camille, M. (1996). Master of death: The lifeless art of Pierre Remiet, illuminator. Yale University Press.
- Cohen, K. (1973). Metamorphosis of a death symbol: The transi tomb in the late Middle Ages and the Renaissance. University of California Press.
- Gertsman, E. (2010). The dance of death in the Middle Ages: Image, text, performance. Brepols.
- Guthke, K. S. (1999). The gender of death: A cultural history in art and literature. Cambridge University Press.
- Kinch, A. (2013). Imago mortis: Mediating images of death in late medieval culture. Brill. doi:10.1163/9789004245815
- Llewellyn, N. (1991). The art of death: Visual culture in the English death ritual, c. 1500–c. 1800. Reaktion Books.
- Marshall, L. (1994). Manipulating the sacred: Image and plague in Renaissance Italy. Renaissance Quarterly, 47(3), 485–532. JSTOR 2863019
- Oosterwijk, S. (2004). Of corpses, constables and kings: The danse macabre in late medieval and Renaissance culture. Journal of the British Archaeological Association, 157(1), 61–90. doi:10.1179/jba.2004.157.1.61
- Oosterwijk, S. (2008). Of dead kings, dukes and constables: The historical context of the danse macabre in late medieval Paris. Journal of the British Archaeological Association, 161(1), 131–162. doi:10.1179/174767008x330563

=== Literature and music ===
- Alexiou, M. (1974). The ritual lament in Greek tradition. Cambridge University Press.
- Amelang, J. S. (2005). Mourning becomes eclectic: Ritual lament and the problem of continuity. Past & Present, 187(1), 3–31. doi:10.1093/pastj/gti011
- Holst-Warhaft, G. (1992). Dangerous voices: Women's laments and Greek literature. Routledge.
- Kay, D. (1990). Melodious tears: The English funeral elegy from Spenser to Milton. Clarendon Press.

=== Photography ===
- Batchen, G. (2004). Forget me not: Photography and remembrance. Princeton Architectural Press.
- Hafsteinsson, S. B. (1999). Post-mortem and funeral photography in Iceland. History of Photography, 23(1), 49–54. doi:10.1080/03087298.1999.10443798
- Linkman, A. (2006). Taken from life: Post-mortem portraiture in Britain 1860–1910. History of Photography, 30(4), 309–347. doi:10.1080/03087298.2006.10443484
- Linkman, A. (2011). Photography and death. Reaktion Books.
- Ruby, J. (1984). Post-mortem portraiture in America. History of Photography, 8(3), 201–222. doi:10.1080/03087298.1984.10442223
- Ruby, J. (1995). Secure the shadow: Death and photography in America. MIT Press.

== Reference works ==
=== Glossaries ===
- Knüsel, C. J. (2014). Crouching in fear: Terms of engagement for funerary remains. Journal of Social Archaeology, 14(1), 26–58. doi:10.1177/1469605313518869

=== Encyclopedias ===
- Booth, P., & Tingle, E. (Eds.). (2021). A companion to death, burial, and remembrance in late medieval and early modern Europe, c. 1300–1700. Brill. doi:10.1163/9789004443433
- Brier, B. (1998). The encyclopedia of mummies. Facts on File.
- Bryant, C. D., & Peck, D. L. (Eds.). (2009). Encyclopedia of death and the human experience. SAGE Publications.
- Bryant, C. D. (Ed.). (2003). Handbook of death and dying. SAGE Publications.
- Cann, C. K. (Ed.). (2018). The Routledge handbook of death and the afterlife. Routledge. doi:10.4324/9781315545349
- Cardin, M. (Ed.). (2014). Mummies around the world: An encyclopedia of mummies in history, religion, and popular culture. ABC-CLIO.
- Davies, D. J., & Mates, L. H. (Eds.). (2005). Encyclopedia of cremation. Routledge.
- Howarth, G., & Leaman, O. (Eds.). (2001). Encyclopedia of death and dying. Routledge.
- Kastenbaum, R., & Kastenbaum, B. (Eds.). (1989). Encyclopedia of death. Oryx Press.
- Kastenbaum, R. (Ed.). (2003). Macmillan encyclopedia of death and dying. Macmillan Reference USA.
- Knüsel, C. J., & Schotsmans, E. M. J. (Eds.). (2022). The Routledge handbook of archaeothanatology: Bioarchaeology of mortuary behaviour. Routledge. doi:10.4324/9781351030625
- Moreman, C. M. (Ed.). (2018). The Routledge companion to death and dying. Routledge.
- Robben, A. C. G. M. (Ed.). (2018). A companion to the anthropology of death. Wiley Blackwell. doi:10.1002/9781119222422
- Taylor, R. P. (2000). Death and the afterlife: A cultural encyclopedia. ABC-CLIO.

== Academic and professional trade journals ==
=== Death and Dying ===
- Thanatos. Finnish Death Studies Association, founded 2012.
- OMEGA - Journal of Death and Dying. SAGE Publications, founded 1970.
- Markers: Annual Journal of the Association for Gravestone Studies. Project MUSE.
- Mortality. Taylor and Francis, founded 1996.
- Death Studies. Taylor and Francis, founded 1977.

=== Death care industry trade journals ===
- Memento Mori. International Cemetery, Cremation and Funeral Association, ten issues a year.
- Canadian Funeral Director. Canada, published since 1993.
- SAIFInsight. National Society of Allied and Independent Funeral Directors.
- Funeral Service Times. Mulberry Publications.
- American Cemetery & Cremation. Kates-Boylston Publications.
- American Funeral Director. Kates-Boylston Publications, founded 1881.
- Funeral Service Insider. Kates-Boylston Publications.
- Funeral Director Monthly. National Association of Funeral Directors.
- The Director. National Funeral Directors Association, monthly.

== See also ==
- Death
- Death and culture
- Death care industry in the United States
- Deathcare
- Disposal of human corpses
- Funeral
- Funeral home
- Mortuary science
- Outline of death
- Personifications of death
- Sociology of death
- Symbols of death
