= Victims' rights group =

Type of advocacy group

A victims' rights group is a type of advocacy group which advocates or lobbies for legal, social or political change on behalf of victims of serious crime or injustice. Members of such groups often include family members or friends of such victims.

The concept of victims' rights groups began developing in the 1970s.

== See also ==
- Mothers Against Drunk Driving
- Mothers of Murdered Offspring
- Victimology
