= Linda Wolfe =

American journalist (1932–2020)

- Born: November 15, 1932; Brooklyn, New York
- Died: February 22, 2020 (aged 87); Manhattan, New York City
- Occupations: Author, book critic
- Writing career
- Genres: True crime, journalism, criticism, non-fiction
- Notable works: Wasted: The Preppie Murder, The Professor and the Prostitute
- Website: www.lindawolfe.com

Linda Wolfe (November 15, 1932 – February 22, 2020) was an American journalist, essayist, and fiction writer. She is best known for her award-winning work, Wasted: The Preppie Murder, an investigation of the so-called "rough sex" killer, Robert Chambers. Critic John Leonard called Wolfe a writer of "fierce intelligence." Wolfe was also a distinguished book critic and a founding member of the National Book Critics Circle.

== Writing ==
Wolfe's Wasted was nominated for an Edgar Award and named a "Notable Book of the Year" by The New York Times. In addition, Wolfe wrote several other books based on true crimes and events, such as Double Life: The Downfall of Judge Sol Wachtler. Her articles and essays have appeared in The New York Times, New York Magazine, Vanity Fair, Ladies Home Journal, Playboy, and several other publications.

== Career ==
Wolfe began her literary career in 1958 as an editorial assistant at Partisan Review alongside editors William Phillips and Philip Rahv. During her time at Partisan, Wolfe studied for a M.A. degree in American literature at New York University and began research on what would be her first published work, The Literary Gourmet. This book would be one of the first to explore the ways and reasons the world's great novelists used dining scenes to illuminate character. In 1960 Wolfe started working for Time Inc., first in the copy department of Life Magazine, then as a researcher and writer for Time-Life Books, where she published her second book, The Cooking of the Caribbean Islands.

In 1971 Wolfe was asked by Clay Felker to write about food for New York Magazine and was soon named a contributing editor, a position she maintained for the next 25 years. From there Wolfe branched out to write about sexuality, social behavior, and crime, particularly about crimes committed by well-placed professionals and academics. One of her better known articles is The Strange Death of the Twin Gynecologists, about twin New York Hospital physicians who were found dead in their apartment. This article would later help inspire the film Dead Ringers. Wolfe also twice served as a restaurant reviewer for New York Magazine in the 1970s.

Wolfe also wrote about travel, starting an annual series called Island Travel that ran in New York Magazine from 1984 to 1994, as well as doing travel pieces for the New York Times, the New York Post, and Washington Post, among others.

Wolfe's interest in sexuality and social behavior would later lead to her writing Playing Around: Women and Adultery and The Cosmo Report: Women and Sex in the Eighties. Wolfe also wrote a profile named A Brief History of Alfred Kinsey, published as an introduction to the movie Kinsey as well as several articles for Playboy and Mirabella June.

== Criticism ==
Wolfe's book reviews appeared in the New York Times, the Washington Post, the Boston Globe, the Atlanta Journal-Constitution, the St. Petersburg Times, and elsewhere. Her involvement with the National Book Critics Circle began in 1976, the year it held its first Awards Ceremony. She served on the governing board from 1997 to 2002 and from 2005 to 2010. In 2011 she started a book review column for the website FabOverFifty.com.

== Early life and education ==
Wolfe was born in Brooklyn, New York, and attended Antioch College and Brooklyn College, graduating from Brooklyn College in 1955. She received an M.A.from New York University in 1959.

== Personal life ==
Wolfe's first marriage was to the magazine editor and film publicist Joseph Wolfe. Her second marriage was to psychologist Max Pollack. She had one daughter, Jessica Bernstein, and two stepdaughters, Deborah and Judith Pollack, as well as two granddaughters, Miriam and Rachel, and two step-grandchildren, Daniel and Emma.

== Works ==
=== Books ===
- My Daughter/Myself 2013
- The Murder of Dr. Chapman: The Legendary Trials of Lucretia Chapman and Her Lover
- Love Me to Death: A Journalist's Memoir of the Hunt for Her Friend's Killer 1998
- Wasted: The Preppie Murder 1989, won Notable Book of the Year
- The Literary Gourmet: Menus From Masterpieces
- Double Life: The Downfall of Judge Sol Wachtler 1994
- The Murder of Dr. Chapman: The Legendary Trials of Lucretia Chapman and Her Lover 2004
- Playing Around: Women and Adultery
- The Professor and the Prostitute and Other True Tales of Murder and Madness 1986
- The Cosmo Report: Women and Sex in the Eighties 1981
- The Cooking of the Caribbean Islands 1971
- The Literary Gourmet 1963

=== Articles ===
- My Manhattan; On East Broadway, a Wide World Unfolds, July 11, 2003
- in Step With Austen: English Country Dancing, March 7, 1997
- Hers; Runaway Memory, April 2, 1995
- And Baby Makes 3, Even if You're Gray, January 4, 1994
- [; New York Woman – Suicide of Theodora Sklover], October 12, 1992
- January 14, 1991 – New York's Toughest Judges
- December 3, 1984 – Dented Pride
- April 9, 1984 – Death in the Video Arcade: A Story of Two Families
- February 6, 1984 – Daylight Express: Trapped in a Turkish Prison
- October 17, 1983 – The Death of an Idealist – Jacqui Bernard
- January 17, 1983 – Transsexual Bartender and the Suburban Princess
- April 5, 1982 – Mommy's 39, Daddy's 57 – And Baby was Just Born
- July 27, 1981 – Taunted to Death – Death of Gerard Coury
- October 20, 1980 – Tragedy on 89th Street – Irene Schwartz
- September 15, 1980 – The Strange Case of Dr. Buettner-Janusch
- April 14, 1980 – Lady Vanishes – Dr. Margaret Kilcoyne
- Contemporary Behavior, Sexuality, Psychology
- October 4, 1982 – Growing up Absorbed
- August 9, 1982 – The G Spot – Criticism
- July 19, 1982 – The Next Sexual Hype – The G Spot
- May 7, 1979 – When was the last time you called your mother
- January 10, 1977 – The Coming Baby Boom
- September 8, 1975 – The Strange Death of the Twin Gynecologists (in New York magazine)
- February 17, 1975 – Funny Valentine
- March 19, 1973 – The Forbidden Couple
- July 3, 1972 – Can Adultery Save Your Marriage?
- June 5, 1972 – A Time of Change
- April 17, 1972 – The Masterses' Disciples: Sexual Therapy in New York
- January 31, 1972 – Divorce – Dominican Style
- March 8, 1971 – Psychotherapy Clinics: Walk in If You Can
- February 13, 1984 – The Return of "Uncle" Gairy
- June 30, 1980 – Olympus on 155th Street
- February 13, 1978 – Mort Janklow: Friends Make the Man
- December 7, 1992 – Fatal Error – The Death of Radio Man Rick Sklar
- April 25, 1983 – Young Doctors at Sea: Caribbean Politics and Current Affairs
- January 14, 1980 – Death by Botulism, A Medical Mystery
- My Manhattan; On East Broadway, a Wide World Unfolds, July 11, 2003
- Winter in the Sun; Martinique, Deja Vu, but Different, October 25, 1998
- Lingering in Languedoc, July 16, 1995

=== Book reviews in New York Times ===
- Crime/Mystery; In the Amazing Kingdom of Thrills, October 20, 1991
- Houston Law November 18, 1990
- Crime in the Family, April 22, 1990
- One Night in Queens February 11, 1990
- Psycho Killer, June 4, 1989
- Australia Found Guilty, March 22, 1987
- Men, Women, and Children First, April 27, 1986
- Filling in the Blanks, November 3, 1985

=== Restaurant reviews ===
- August 8, 1977 – Small is Beautiful
- March 19, 1973 – To Eat, Perchance to Dream
- August 30, 1971 – A Room with a View
