= Robert Chambers (criminal) =

American criminal (born 1966)

Robert Emmet Chambers Jr.
- Born: September 25, 1966 (age 60); New York, New York, U.S.
- Other names: The Preppy Killer; The Central Park Strangler
- Known for: Killing of Jennifer Levin
- Parents: Robert Emmet Chambers Sr. (father); Phyllis Chambers (née Shanley) (mother)
- Status: Paroled
- Convictions: First degree manslaughter First degree criminal sale of a controlled substance Second degree assault Second degree burglary
- Penalty: 5 to 15 years imprisonment (1988); 19 years imprisonment (2008)

Robert Emmet Chambers Jr. (born September 25, 1966) is an American criminal. Dubbed the Preppy Killer and the Central Park Strangler, Chambers gained notoriety for the August 26, 1986, strangulation death of 18-year-old Jennifer Levin in New York City's Central Park, for which he was originally charged with second degree murder. Chambers changed his story several times during the course of the ensuing investigation, ultimately claiming that Levin's death was the accidental result of him pushing her off of him as she purportedly sexually assaulted him, an account that was characterized by media accounts as one of "rough sex". Chambers later pleaded guilty to manslaughter after a jury failed to reach a verdict after nine days of deliberation.

== Early life ==
Robert Emmett Chambers was born on September 25, 1966, the only child of Phyllis Chambers, an Irish-born nurse, and Robert Chambers Sr., who worked for MCA Records and later in videocassette distribution. The family inititally lived in the working-class neighborhood of Jackson Heights, Queens, and later moved to Manhattan. Though not affluent, Chambers' mother worked to pay for his childhood attendance at the prestigious York Preparatory School on the Upper East Side, though scholarships assisted in this. The fact that his family had far less money than his classmates created social problems for Chambers, including difficulty socializing with his peers. By the time he reached college age, Chambers had descended into a life of petty theft, alcoholism, and drug use. Chambers was accepted by Boston University, but was asked to leave after one semester for reasons which included the use of a stolen credit card. He later committed other petty thefts and burglaries in connection with his drug and alcohol abuse. Unable to hold a job, Chambers was issued a summons for disorderly conduct one night after leaving Dorrian's Red Hand, a bar located at 300 East 84th Street in Manhattan. He destroyed the summons as the police were leaving the scene, yelling, "You fucking cowards, you should stick to niggers!"

== Killing of Jennifer Levin ==
=== Background ===
Chambers’ girlfriend at the time of the murder was future television actress Alex Kapp. The couple broke up after Chambers stole Kapp's $50 allowance and according to Kapp, after Levin had started to pursue him, Levin and Chambers briefly dated. On the day of the murder, both were at Dorrian's Red Hand.

=== Finding of the body ===
A bicyclist found Levin's half-naked body on August 26, 1986, at about 6:15 a.m., in Central Park near Fifth Avenue and 83rd Street, behind the Metropolitan Museum of Art. Her body was lying twisted by a tree, with her bra and top pulled up. Levin's body and face were covered in scratches and bite marks. Deep red marks were across her neck, her left eye was swollen, and her fingernails were bruised, suggesting that in her final moments she had tried to pull down whatever had been strangling her.

Chambers hid and watched as police officers surveyed the scene. Investigators found Levin's underwear some 50 yards (46 m) away.

Levin's autopsy was performed by associate medical examiner Dr. Maria Luz Alandy, who determined that Levin had been strangled. Levin was estimated to have died around 5:30 a.m.

=== Arrest and trial ===
After several of Dorrian's patrons told police that they had last seen Levin leaving the bar with Chambers, police went to his home. Upon arrival, they saw that Chambers had fresh and bloody scratches on both sides of his face, which he blamed on his cat before later admitting his cat was declawed. Chambers agreed to accompany police to the Central Park precinct for questioning. There he was asked if he left Dorrian's with Levin, which he denied. After police told him that bar patrons had witnessed him leaving with Levin, he admitted that he had.

He said that she quickly went to buy cigarettes. Detective Marty Gill knew that Levin did not smoke and pointed it out to Chambers. Chambers admitted that she had not gone for cigarettes. He then claimed that she cajoled him into going to Central Park to have sex and she died during an aggressive sexual encounter in the park. Before booking, Chambers was permitted to see his father, to whom he said, "That fucking bitch, why didn't she leave me alone?"

Chambers said that he had gone into a doughnut shop. Detective Gill fibbed, and told Chambers that he had a friend who worked in that shop, and that friend did not remember Chambers being in there. Robert Chambers left in handcuffs. That happened to be Marty Gill's last day on the job. He turned in his badge and left the precinct, now retired.

Archbishop Theodore Edgar McCarrick of Newark, New Jersey, later Archbishop of Washington, wrote a letter of support for Chambers' bail application. He had known Chambers and his mother because she had been employed as a nurse by Cardinal Terence Cooke. McCarrick was close to the Chambers family and had served as Robert's godfather at his baptism. In 2019, he was defrocked for sex offenses against adults and minors. Chambers had secured bail through his family and the owner of the bar, Jack Dorrian, who put up his townhouse as collateral for a bail bond.

Chambers was charged with, and tried for, two counts of second-degree murder. His defense was that Levin's death had occurred during "rough sex". He was defended by Jack Litman, who had previously used the temporary insanity defense on behalf of Richard Herrin for the murder of Yale University student Bonnie Garland. Litman claimed Levin was promiscuous, saying she had a sex diary and that her sexual history was admissible as evidence, prompting headlines such as "How Jennifer Courted Death" in New York's Daily News. On remand, Chambers was filmed twisting off the head of a Barbie doll and saying, "Oops, I think I killed her."

Prosecutor Linda Fairstein stated: "In more than 8,000 cases of reported assaults in the last ten years, this is the first in which a male reported being sexually assaulted by a female."

Chambers' trial began on January 4, 1988, and lasted 13 weeks. Alandy testified on February 9 that pinpoint hemorrhages observed in the soft tissue around Levin's eyes could be caused by a constriction of the blood vessels in the neck. She explained that this was evidence of compression of her neck, and an indication that she had been strangled. When Chambers' attorney, Jack Litman, suggested on cross-examination that Chambers could have choked Levin in an arm lock that could cause death in seconds, and that the marks on her neck could have been made when she quickly moved her head from side to side in a struggle for air, Alandy stated that while such an occurrence was possible, this did not occur in Levin's case. She also stated that while some of the injuries on Levin's neck could have been caused by Chambers' wristwatch and shirt, rather than his hands, her injuries overall were not consistent with the scenario Litman described.

When the jury failed to reach a verdict after nine days of deliberation, the prosecution and Chambers agreed to a plea bargain. He pleaded guilty to first-degree manslaughter, which carried a sentence of between five and fifteen years. He was also required to admit that he intended to hurt Levin sufficiently to cause her death. During his sentencing that April, he stated in court, "It breaks my heart to have to say that. The Levin family has gone through hell because of my actions, and I am sorry." Chambers received a sentence of 15 years in prison.

== Post-conviction ==
In 1997, Chambers sent an untitled essay he wrote to prison anthologist Jeff Evans. The piece, subsequently titled "Christmas: Present", appeared in the book Undoing Time: American Prisoners in Their Own Words. Written while Chambers was incarcerated at Green Haven Correctional Facility in Stormville, New York, the essay is an entry from one of his journals, which he calls "a record of the meaningless hope and frightening losses of a person I don't even know."

Chambers was released from Auburn Prison on February 14, 2003, after having served the entirety of his prison term due to his numerous infractions. His release was a media circus, with reporters staking out prime sections of the sidewalk opposite the prison as early as thirteen hours before his 7:30 a.m. release time. The same day, Dateline NBC interviewed Chambers, who continued to claim that he strangled Levin accidentally in an attempt to stop her from hurting him during rough sex. He also falsely denied that he had been disciplined in prison.

Jack Dorrian settled with Levin's parents on their claim that Dorrian's bar, where Levin and Chambers had been before they went to Central Park on the night of her death, had served too much alcohol to Chambers. A wrongful death lawsuit, which Chambers did not contest, provides that he must pay all lump sums he receives, including any income from book or movie deals, plus ten percent of his future income (up to $25 million), to the Levin family. The family has said all the money it gets from Chambers will go to victims' rights organizations.

== Drug charges ==
In July 2005, Chambers pleaded guilty to a misdemeanor drug charge and on August 29 was given a reduced sentence of 90 days in jail and fined $200 for a license violation. The judge added 10 days to the time prosecutors and Chambers' lawyer had agreed on because he was an hour late for the hearing. He would have faced up to a year in jail if he had been convicted after trial.

On October 22, 2007, Chambers was arrested again, this time in his own apartment, and charged with three counts of selling a controlled substance in the first degree, three counts of selling a controlled substance in the second degree, and one count of resisting arrest. His longtime girlfriend, Shawn Kovell, was also arrested on one count of selling a controlled substance in the second degree. The Daily News reported:

Cops said Chambers, 41, struggled with officers who tried to handcuff him on the felony charges. One detective suffered a broken thumb in the fracas.

Commenting on his new arrest, former Assistant District Attorney Linda Fairstein, who had prosecuted Chambers for Levin's death, said:

Doesn't surprise me. I always believed his problem with drugs and alcohol would get him in trouble again. He's had the opportunity in prison to detox and take college courses, to straighten out his life, but that clearly is of no interest to him. He's learned nothing in the last 20 years.

Chambers and Kovell were charged with running a cocaine operation out of the apartment. The two had previously been given notices for not paying rent, and the phone had been disconnected.

On August 11, 2008, the Manhattan DA's office announced that Chambers had pleaded guilty to selling drugs. On September 2, 2008, he was sentenced to 19 years on the drug charge. Chambers was released from New York's Shawangunk Correctional Facility on July 25, 2023, after serving 15 years of his 19-year sentence. He will be on parole until 2028.

== In popular culture ==
- The Sonic Youth song "Eliminator Jr.", from their 1988 album Daydream Nation (1988), is about the Chambers case.
- The song "Jenny Was a Friend of Mine" from The Killers' album Hot Fuss (2004) was inspired by Chambers' defense of the Jennifer Levin murder charges, in which Chambers claimed he had no motive for the murder, and that he and the victim were "friends".
- In 1989, the Chambers case was the basis of a TV movie titled The Preppie Murder, starring William Baldwin as Chambers and Lara Flynn Boyle as Levin.
- The 1990 Law & Order episode "Kiss the Girls and Make Them Die" was based on the case.
- Mike Doyle has stated that his character Adam Guenzel on Oz (1997–2003) was based on Chambers.
- The 2003 Law & Order: Criminal Intent episode "Monster" was based on both the Chambers case and the Central Park Jogger case.
- In the novel American Psycho, the protagonist Patrick Bateman mentions trying to start a defense fund for Chambers.
- In the collection Shock Treatment by Karen Finley, Chambers is mentioned twice.
- AMC aired a five-part miniseries The Preppy Murder: Death in Central Park on November 13, 2019.
- The novel A Gorgeous Excitement by Cynthia Weiner, which tells the story of the Preppy Killer from the point of view of one of his acquaintances.
