= Wasted: The Preppie Murder =

1989 book by Linda Wolfe

- Author: Linda Wolfe
- Language: English
- Genre: Non-fiction
- Publisher: Simon & Schuster
- Publication date: 1989

Wasted: The Preppie Murder is a book by Linda Wolfe, published by Simon & Schuster in 1989.

It is about Jennifer Levin's murder by Robert E. Chambers Jr.

== Awards ==
The book was named a Notable Book of the Year by the New York Times. It was nominated for an Edgar Award.

== Reception ==
The New York Times book reviewer Michale M. Thomas called it "an excellent, valuable book." The Los Angeles Times gave it a mixed review. Kirkus Reviews called it a "copiously researched summing up of a sad, sad story."
