= Self-preservation =

Behaviors that ensure an organism's survival

Self-preservation is a behavior or set of behaviors that ensures the survival of an organism. It is thought to be universal among all living organisms.

Self-preservation is essentially the process of an organism preventing itself from being harmed or killed and is considered a basic instinct in most organisms. Most call it a "survival instinct". Self-preservation is thought to be tied to an organism's reproductive fitness and can be more or less present according to perceived reproduction potential. If perceived reproductive potential is low enough, self-destructive behavior (i.e., the opposite) is not uncommon in social species. Self-preservation is also thought by some to be the basis of rational and logical thought and behavior.

The opposite of self-preservation is self-destructive behavior.

== Overview ==
An organism's fitness is measured by its ability to pass on its genes. The most straightforward way to accomplish this is to survive to a reproductive age, mate if necessary, and then produce offspring. These offspring will hold at least a portion of their parent's genes, or up to all of the parent's genes in asexual organisms. But in order for this to happen, an organism must first survive long enough to reproduce, and this would mainly consist of adopting selfish behaviors that would allow organisms to maximize their own chances for survival.

Even the most simple of living organisms (for example, the single-celled bacteria) are typically under intense selective pressure to evolve a response that would help avoid a damaging environment, if such an environment exists. Organisms also evolve while adapting – even thriving – in a benign environment (for example, a marine sponge modifies its structure in response to current changes, in order to better absorb and process nutrients).

Self-preservation is, therefore, an almost universal hallmark of life. However, when introduced to a novel threat, many species will have a self-preservation response either too specialised, or not specialised enough, to cope with that particular threat. An example is the dodo, which evolved in the absence of natural predators, and hence lacked an appropriate, general self-preservation response to heavy predation by humans and rats, showing no fear of them.

=== Sentient organisms ===
For sentient organisms, pain and fear are integral parts of this mechanism. Pain motivates the individual to withdraw from damaging situations, to protect a damaged body part while it heals, and to avoid similar experiences in the future. Most pain resolves promptly once the painful stimulus is removed and the body has healed, but sometimes pain persists despite removal of the stimulus and apparent healing of the body; and sometimes pain arises in the absence of any detectable stimulus, damage or disease. Fear causes the organism to seek safety and may cause a release of adrenaline, which has the effect of increased strength and heightened senses such as hearing, smell, and sight. Self-preservation may also be interpreted figuratively, in regard to the coping mechanisms one needs to prevent emotional trauma from distorting the mind (see Defence mechanisms).

=== Cellular ===
Self-preservation is not just limited to individual organisms; this can be scaled up or down to other levels of life. Narula and Young indicate that cardiac myocytes have an acute sense of self-preservation. They are able to duck, dart, and dodge foreign substances that may harm the cell. In addition, when a myocardiac arrest – a heart attack – occurs, it is actually the cardiac myocytes entering a state of hibernation in an attempt to wait out a lack of resources. While this is ultimately deadly to the organism, it prolongs the cell's survival as long as possible for hopeful resuscitation.

=== Group ===
When scaled in the opposite direction, Hughes-Jones makes the argument that "social groups that fight each other are self‐sustaining, self‐replicating wholes containing interdependent parts" indicating that the group as a whole can have self-preservation with the individuals acting as the cells.

He makes an analogy between the survival practices such as hygiene and the ritual nature within small human groups or the nations that engage in religious warfare with the complex survival mechanisms of multicellular organisms that evolved from the cooperative association of single cell organisms in order to better protect themselves.

=== Instrumental convergence ===
In the field of artificial intelligence, the concept of instrumental convergence holds that sufficiently intelligent agents have a tendency to pursue a similar set of intermediary subgoals such as self-preservation, as they instrumentally help accomplish final goals. Stuart J. Russell illustrates this point by stating that a robot whose only goal would be to fetch coffee would have an incentive to preserve itself, as "it can't fetch the coffee if it's dead". Other proposed instrumental goals include resource acquisition, self-improvement, and goal-content integrity.

== Implications ==
=== Social ===
The desire for self-preservation has led to countless laws and regulations surrounding a culture of safety in society. Seat belt laws, speed limits, texting regulations, and the "stranger danger" campaign are examples of societal guides and regulations to enhance survival, and these laws are heavily influenced by the pursuit of self-preservation.

=== Economic ===
Self-preservation urges animals to collect energy and resources required to prolong life as well as resources that increase chances of survival. Basic needs are available to most humans (roughly 7 out of 8 people), and usually rather cheaply. The instinct that drives humans to gather resources now drives them to over-consumption or to patterns of collection and possession that essentially make hoarding resources the priority.

== Self-destructive behavior ==
Animals in a social group (of kin) often work cooperatively in order to survive, but when one member perceives itself as a burden for an extended period of time, it may commit self-destructive behavior. This allows its relatives to have a better chance at survival, and if enough close relatives survive, then its genes can possibly be indirectly passed on. This behavior works in the exact opposite direction of the survival instinct and could be considered a highly altruistic behavior evolved from a cooperative group. Self-destructive behavior is not the same as risk-taking behavior, although risk-taking behavior could turn into destructive behavior.

== See also ==
- Antipredator adaptation
- Collective intelligence
- Conatus
- Dear enemy recognition
- Death – result of failure to survive
  - Outline of death – topic tree of the subjects related to the end of life
- Fight-or-flight response
- Outline of self
- Self-defense
- Will to live
