= Outline of death =

Permanent end of an organism's life

The following outline is provided as an overview of and a topical guide to death:

Death – the termination of all biological functions that sustain a living organism

== What is death? ==
Death can be described as all of the following:

- End of life – life is the characteristic distinguishing physical entities having signaling and self-sustaining processes from those that do not, either because such functions have ceased (death), or because they lack such functions and are classified as inanimate.
- (Death is) the opposite of:
  - Life – (see above)
  - Biogenesis – the production of new living organisms or organelles. The law of biogenesis, attributed to Louis Pasteur, is the observation that living things come only from other living things, by reproduction (e.g. a spider lays eggs, which develop into spiders).
    - Fertilisation (Conception) – the beginning of an organism's life, initiated by the fusion of gametes resulting in the development of a new individual organism. In animals, the process involves the fusion of an ovum with a sperm, which eventually leads to the development of an embryo.
    - Birth – the act or process of bearing or bringing forth offspring. In mammals, the process is initiated by hormones which cause the muscular walls of the uterus to contract, expelling the fetus at a developmental stage when it is ready to feed and breathe. Commonly considered the beginning of one's life. "First you are born, then you live life, then you die."
      - De-extinction – the process of creating an organism, which is a member of or resembles an extinct species, or a breeding population of such organisms. Cloning is the most widely proposed method, although selective breeding has also been proposed. Similar techniques have been applied to endangered species. Though we, humans, have not been able to bring an extinct species back to life as of to date.
  - Survival – Survival is simply the need to live, the only real purpose of an organism is to generate offspring
    - Indefinite lifespan – the term used in the life extension movement and transhumanism to refer to the hypothetical longevity of humans (and other life-forms) under conditions in which aging is effectively and completely prevented and treated. Their lifespans would be "indefinite" (that is, they would not be "immortal") because protection from the effects of aging on health does not guarantee survival. Such individuals would still be susceptible to accidental or intentional death by disease, starvation, getting hit by a truck, murdered, and so on, but not death from aging, some animals can live forever such as the Turritopsis dohrnii jellyfish, or the Hydra hydrozoans.

== Types of death ==
- Individual death – termination of all biological functions within a living organism
- Extinction – the death of an entire species, or more specifically, death of the last member of a species
  - Extinction event – a widespread and rapid decrease in the amount of life on Earth. Such an event is identified by a sharp reduction in the diversity and abundance of macroscopic life. Also known as a mass extinction or biotic crisis.
  - Human extinction – the hypothesized end of the human species. Various scenarios have been discussed in science, popular culture, and religion (see Eschatology)
  - Local extinction (extirpation) – a condition of a species (another taxon) that ceases to exist in the chosen geographic area of study, though it still exists elsewhere. Local extinctions are contrasted with global extinctions. Local extinction can be reversed by reintroduction of the species to the area from other locations; wolf reintroduction is an example of this.

== Causes of death ==
=== Causes of death, by type ===
- Accidents – unplanned events or circumstances, often with lack of intention or necessity. They generally have negative outcomes which might have been avoided or prevented had circumstances leading up to each accident had been recognized, and acted upon, prior to occurrence. An example of a type of accident that can cause death is a traffic collision.
  - List of accident types
- Biological aging –
- Disease –
  - Terminal illness
- Injury
  - Wound
    - Mortal wound
- Killing – causing the death of a living organism, usually for the purpose of survival, including the defense of self and or others.
  - Predation –
  - Homicide –
    - Murder – killing of a human done in malice
    - Human sacrifice
  - Sacrifice
    - Human sacrifice
    - Animal sacrifice
  - Suicide – the act of intentionally causing one's own death. Suicide is often carried out as a result of despair, the cause of which is frequently attributed to a mental disorder such as depression, bipolar disorder, schizophrenia, borderline personality disorder, alcoholism, or drug abuse. Stress factors such as financial difficulties or troubles with interpersonal relationships often play a role. Efforts to prevent suicide include limiting access to firearms, treating mental illness and drug misuse, and improving economic circumstances.
    - Assisted suicide –
    - Copycat suicide –
    - Familicide –
    - Forced suicide –
    - Honor suicide –
    - Internet suicide pact –
    - Mass suicide –
    - Murder–suicide –
    - Suicide pact –
    - Parasuicide –
    - Suicide attack –
    - Suicide by cop –
  - Capital punishment – a legal process whereby a person is put to death by the state as a punishment for a crime. The judicial decree that someone is punished in this manner is a death sentence, while the actual enforcement is an execution. Also called the "death penalty".
    - List of methods of capital punishment
  - Genocide – the systematic destruction of all or a significant part of a racial, ethnic, religious or national group. Well-known examples of genocide include the Holocaust, the Armenian genocide, and more recently the Rwandan genocide.
  - War – an organized and often prolonged conflict that is carried out by states or non-state actors. It is generally characterized by extreme violence, social disruption and an attempt at economic destruction. War should be understood as an actual, intentional and widespread armed conflict between political communities, and therefore is defined as a form of (collective) political violence or intervention. The set of techniques used by a group to carry out war is known as warfare.
- Laughing oneself to death (extremely rare) –
- Natural disasters –
  - Avalanches –
  - Earthquakes –
  - Volcanic eruptions –
  - Hydrological disasters – disasters involving bodies of water
    - Floods –
    - Limnic eruptions –
    - Tsunamis –
  - Meteorological disasters – disasters involving weather phenomena
    - Blizzards –
    - Cyclonic storms –
      - Tropical cyclones –
      - Extratropical cyclones –
    - Droughts –
    - Hailstorms –
    - Heat waves –
    - Tornadoes –
  - Wildfires –
  - Epidemics –
  - Space disasters –
    - Impact events –
    - Solar flares –

=== Other classifications of causes of death ===
- Causes of death by rate
- Potential causes of death
  - Global catastrophic risks –
- Preventable causes of death

== Effects of death ==
- Effects of the anticipation of death
  - Death anxiety – a morbid, abnormal or persistent fear of one's own death or the process of his/her dying. One definition of death anxiety is a "feeling of dread, apprehension or solicitude (anxiety) when one thinks of the process of dying, or ceasing to 'be'". Also known as thanatophobia (fear of death).
  - Mortality salience –
- Effects on the deceased (and on the cadaver) – "deceased" is short for "deceased person", which is a person who has died and who is therefore dead. A cadaver is the body of a dead person.
  - End of consciousness – a dead body is no longer awake, but there is the question of where consciousness went to, if anywhere...
    - Is there consciousness after death? – there is a debate between proponents of the following possibilities:
      - Eternal oblivion
      - Afterlife
  - Cessation of breathing
  - Cardiac arrest – the heart has stopped beating (no pulse)
  - Pallor mortis – paleness which happens in the 15–120 minutes after death
  - Livor mortis – settling of the blood in the lower (dependent) portion of the body
  - Algor mortis – reduction in body temperature following death. This is generally a steady decline until matching ambient temperature
  - Rigor mortis – limbs of the corpse become stiff (Latin rigor) and difficult to move or manipulate
  - Decomposition – reduction into simpler forms of matter, accompanied by a strong, unpleasant odor.
    - Putrefaction –
  - Other (possible) effects
    - Death erection –
  - Treatment of corpses
    - In the wild
      - Consumed by predators (if those predators made the kill) – a predator is an organism that hunts and then eats its prey
      - Consumed by scavengers – a scavenger is an animal that feeds on dead animal and/or plant material present in its habitat
      - Decomposed by detritivores – detritivores are organisms which recycle detritus, returning it to the environment for reuse in the food chain. Examples of detritivores include earthworms, woodlice and dung beetles.
      - Fossilization
      - Catagenesis
    - In society
      - Embalming
      - Disposal of human corpses
        - Burial
          - Burial at sea
          - Natural burial
          - Sky burial
        - Cremation
      - Preservation of human corpses
        - Cryonics
- Effects on others
  - Grief –
    - Mourning –
  - Depression –

== History of death ==
- Deaths of people
  - Deaths by year
    - Deaths of philosophers
    - Unusual deaths
  - Disasters by death toll
    - Natural disasters by death toll
  - People by cause of death
  - TV actors who died during production
- Deaths of other species
  - Timeline of extinctions
- Fascination with death
- History of dissection
- Mummification
- Premature obituaries

== Philosophy and death ==
- Meaning of life

== Death and culture ==
Death and culture

- Obituary
- Death and the Internet
- Disposal of human corpses
- Expressions related to death
- Personification of death – the concept of Death as a sentient entity has existed in many societies since the beginning of recorded history. For example, in English culture, Death is often given the name "the Grim Reaper" and, from the 15th century onwards, came to be shown as a skeletal figure carrying a large scythe and clothed in a black cloak with a hood.
- Wake

=== Medical field and death ===
- Abortion
- Autopsy
- Cadaveric spasm
- Death rattle
- End-of-life care
- Euthanasia
- Lazarus sign
- Lazarus syndrome
- Medical definition of death
  - Brain death
  - Clinical death
  - Death by natural causes
  - Unnatural death
- Mortal wound
- Organ donation
- Terminal illness

=== Politics of death ===
- Assisted suicide
- Martyr
- Mass grave
- Right to life
  - Right to life debates
    - Abortion debate
    - Capital punishment debate
      - Capital punishment debate in the United States
    - Euthanasia debate
- Right to die
  - Euthanasia
    - Euthanasia debate
- War

==== Legalities of death ====
- Abortion law
- Autopsy
  - Cause of death – the purpose of a forensic autopsy is to determine the cause of death, which is the condition or conditions officially determined to have resulted in a human's death. In modern times, such a determination usually is essential data on a governmental death certificate.
- Capital punishment
  - Death row
- Coroner
- Crimes related to death
  - Crimes against humanity related to death
    - Murder
    - Massacre
    - Genocide
  - Death threat
  - Homicide
    - Manslaughter
    - Murder
      - Homicide occurring during a felony
  - Necrophilia
- Disposal of human corpses
- Disposition of the estate of the deceased
  - Probate
    - Administration of an estate on death
    - Inheritance
    - Probate court
    - Probate law
    - Will
  - Trust law
- Legal death
  - Declared death in absentia
  - Death certificate
    - Cause of death
- Right to die

=== Religion and death ===
- Religious beliefs concerning death
  - Afterlife
    - Heaven
    - Hell
  - Resurrection
- Religious ceremonies concerning death
  - Last rites
  - Funeral
    - Eulogy
    - Wake

=== Death care industry ===
Death care industry – companies and organizations that provide services related to death (i.e., funerals, cremation or burial, and memorials).

- Death care industry sectors
  - Cemeteries –
  - Coffin industry –
  - Funeral homes –
    - Crematory industry –
  - Stonemasonry – craft of creating buildings, structures (including memorials), and sculpture (including headstones), using stone from the earth.
    - Headstone industry –
    - Memorial industry –
- Death care industry products and services
  - Coffins (product) –
  - Funerals (service) –
  - Burial (service) –
  - Cremation (service) –
  - Headstones (product) –
  - Memorials (product) –
- Death care professionals
  - Funeral director –
  - Stonemason – using stone from the earth, stonemasons create buildings, structures, and sculpture, including headstones and memorials.
- Death care companies
  - Service Corporation International
  - Stewart Enterprises

== Science of death ==
- Forensic pathology
- Funeral director
- Mortuary science
- Necrobiology
- Taphonomy
- Thanatology

=== Psychology of death ===
- Death anxiety
- Morbid curiosity

=== Demography of death ===
- Karōshi
- Maternal death
- Mortality displacement
- Mortality rate
  - Maternal death
  - Perinatal mortality
  - Infant mortality
  - Child mortality

== Paranormal concepts pertaining to death ==
- Pseudoscience
  - Paranormal research
    - Parapsychology
      - Reincarnation research
- Death-related paranormal phenomena
  - Deathbed phenomena
  - Afterlife
    - After-death communication
      - Séance
    - Ghosts
  - Near-death experience
  - Near-death studies
  - Necromancy

== Death-related organizations ==
- Grief support
  - Mothers of Murdered Offspring
  - Rainbows
  - The Grief Recovery Institute
- Organizations dedicated to the abolition of capital punishment (death penalty)
  - International
    - Amnesty International
    - Buddhist Peace Fellowship
    - Human Rights Watch
    - International Committee Against Executions
    - Reprieve (organisation)
    - World Coalition Against the Death Penalty
  - In the United States
    - Campaign to End the Death Penalty
    - Conservatives Concerned About the Death Penalty
    - Death Penalty Focus
    - National Coalition to Abolish the Death Penalty
    - People of Faith Against the Death Penalty
    - Texas Moratorium Network
    - Texas Students Against the Death Penalty
    - Witness to Innocence

== Death-related publications ==
- Book of the Dead
- The American Way of Death, by Jessica Mitford
- The American Way of Death Revisited, by Jessica Mitford
- The Japanese Way of Death, by Hikaru Suzuki
- Tibetan Book of the Dead

== Dead people ==
- Lists of deaths by year

== Other ==
- Immortality
- Preventable causes of death
- Coffin birth
- Post-mortem interval
- Promession
- Resomation

Political/legal

- Cause of death
- Death-qualified jury
- Dying declaration
- Faked death
- Inquest
- Suspicious death

After death

- Other aspects
  - Afterlife
  - Cemetery
  - Customs
  - Death mask
  - Eternal oblivion
  - Examination
  - Funeral
  - Grief
  - Intermediate state
  - Mourning
  - Resurrection
  - Taboo on the dead
  - Vigil

Other

- Death anniversary
- Death anxiety
- Death deity
  - Personification of death
  - Dying-and-rising god
  - Psychopomp
- Death camp
- Death drive
- Death education
- Death hoax
- Death knell
- Death march
- Death messenger
- Death notification
- Death poem
- Death squad
- Festival of the dead
- Necrophobia
- The Order of the Good Death
- Spiritual death
- Thanatosensitivity
- Undead

== See also ==
- Outline of life science
