= Post-mortem chemistry =

Subdiscipline of chemistry

Post-mortem chemistry, also called necrochemistry or death chemistry, is a subdiscipline of chemistry in which the chemical structures, reactions, processes and parameters of a dead organism is investigated. Post-mortem chemistry plays a significant role in forensic pathology. Biochemical analyses of vitreous humor, cerebrospinal fluid, blood and urine is important in determining the cause of death or in elucidating forensic cases.

== Post-mortem Interval Measurement ==
The post-mortem interval is the time that has elapsed since death. There are several different methods that can be used to estimate the post-mortem interval.

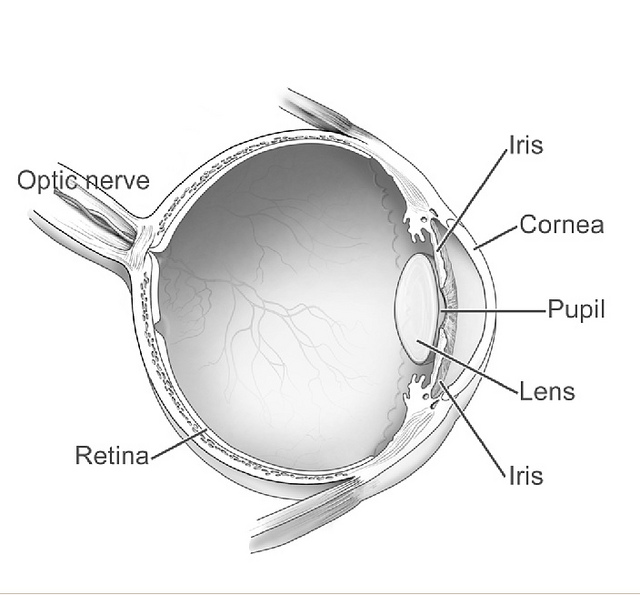
The vitreous humor is contained between the lens and the retina.

=== Vitreous Humor Analysis ===
The vitreous humor is four to five milliliters of colorless gel in the vitreous body of the eye. Because of its location and the inert nature of the vitreous humor, it is resistant to some of the post-mortem changes that occur in the rest of the body. This is what makes it useful in determining the time since death, along with the fact that it is not affected by age, sex, or cause of death. One of the reasons sampling vitreous humour is common is because if the sample being taken for examination is not in contact with blood it can then be clinically tested at a much lower cost. The viscosity of the vitreous humour will be increased after time of death due to water escaping. This requires for the sample to follow certain preparation steps before it can be used for analysis. Standard treatment prior to use of the sample might be required for the accuracy of pipetting. Such as diluting, centrifuging, heating and even the addition of certain analytes. It is also useful as a source of DNA or for diagnosing diseases. The vitreous humor contains various electrolytes, including but not limited to sodium, potassium, chlorine, calcium, and magnesium. The concentrations of these electrolytes can be measured with analyzers and related to the time since death with various equations. There are various equations because each study has different results, which results in different equations. This is because there are so many factors and differences in experiments that a single equation cannot be determined to be better than the rest. One of these factors is temperature. At higher temperatures, the concentrations are less stable and the degradation of the sample speeds up. The temperature can be controlled once a sample is in the lab, but until then, the body will be the same temperature as the environment it was in. If the same equation is used for a sample that was not kept cold, then the result will not be accurate if the equation is for samples kept cold. Even though different equations have been found, the general trends are in agreement. As the time of death increases, the potassium concentration in the vitreous humor rises, and the sodium and calcium concentrations fall. The ratio of potassium to sodium decreases linearly with time. The reason that the potassium levels rise after death is because of a leak in the cell membrane that allows the concentration to reach equilibrium with the potassium levels in the blood plasma. This method is not exact, but a good estimate for the time since death can be obtained.

=== Cerebrospinal Fluid Analysis ===
Cerebrospinal fluid is found in the brain and spinal cord. It is a clear fluid that provides a barrier to absorb shock and prevent injury to the brain. It is useful for diagnosing neuro-degenerative diseases such as Alzheimers. There are various substances in the cerebrospinal fluid that can be measured including urea, glucose, potassium, chloride, sodium, protein, creatinine, calcium, alkaline phosphatase, and cortisol. Different things can be learned about the person or how the died by looking at the concentrations of some of these substances. For example, high levels of urea can indicate kidney damage. High levels of cortisol, the hormone released under stress, could indicate a violent death. Creatinine is stable post-mortem, so the concentration at death is preserved. This is also helpful to determine the kidney function of an individual. Sodium and Potassium can also be measured in the cerebrospinal fluid to predict the time since death, but it is not as accurate as it would be if the vitreous humor was used, since it has a lower correlation.

== Toxicological Analysis ==
Toxicology refers to the science of the chemical and physical properties of toxic substances. Samples from a body are analyzed for drugs or other toxic substances. The concentrations are measured and the substance's contribution to a death can be determined. This is done by comparing concentrations to lethal limits. The most common samples analyzed are blood, urine, kidney, liver, and brain. The samples are usually put through various tests, but the most common instrument used to quantify and determine a substance is gas chromatography-mass spectrometry (GC-MS). These instruments produce chromatograms of the sample, which are then compared to a database of known substances. In blood samples, the substance can usually be found, but in the liver, kidneys, and urine the metabolite may be the only substance that can be found. A metabolite is the broken down version of the original substance after it has gone through digestion and/or other biological processes. Substances can take anywhere from hours to weeks to metabolize and leave the body and have different retention times in different parts of the body. For example, cocaine can be detected in the blood for two to ten days, while it can be detected in urine for two to five days.

The results of post-mortem toxicology testing are interpreted alongside the victim's history, a thorough investigation of the scene, and autopsy and ancillary study findings to determine the manner of death.

=== Blood Analysis ===
When blood is used for toxicology testing, drugs of abuse are the usual targets of analysis. Other substances that may be looked for are medications that are known to be prescribed to the individual or poisons if it is suspected.

=== Tissue Analysis ===
Tissues can be analyzed to help determine a cause of death. The tissue samples that are most commonly analyzed are the liver, kidney, brain, and lungs.

=== Hair and Fingernail Analysis ===
Hair samples can also be analyzed post-mortem to determine if there was a history of drug use or poisoning due to the fact that many substances stay in the hair for a long time. The hair can be separated into sections and a month by month analysis can be performed. Fingernails and hair follicles can also be analyzed for DNA evidence.

=== Gastric Contents ===
The stomach contents can also be analyzed. This can help with the post-mortem interval identification by looking at the stage of digestion. The contents can also be analyzed for drugs or poisons to help determine a cause of death if it is unknown.

== Post-mortem Diagnosis ==
Post-mortem diagnosis is the use of post-mortem chemistry analysis tests to diagnose a disease after someone has died. Some diseases are unknown until death, or were not correctly diagnosed earlier. One way that diseases can be diagnosed is by examining the concentrations of certain substances in the blood or other sample types. For example, diabetic ketoacidosis can be diagnosed by looking at the concentration glucose levels in the vitreous humor, ketone bodies, glycated hemoglobin, or glucose in the urine. Dehydration can be diagnosed by looking for increased urea nitrogen, sodium, and chloride levels, with normal creatinine levels in the vitreous humor. Endocrine disorders can be diagnosed by looking at hormone concentrations and epinephrine and insulin levels. Liver diseases can be diagnosed by looking at the ratio of albumin and globulin in the sample.

== Post-Mortem Biochemistry ==
Blood pH and concentrations of several chemicals are tested in a corpse to help determine the time of death of the victim, also known as the post-mortem interval. These chemicals include lactic acid, hypoxanthine, uric acid, ammonia, NADH and formic acid.

The decrease in the concentration of oxygen because of the lack of circulation causes a dramatic switch from aerobic to anaerobic metabolism

This type of analysis can be used to help diagnose various different types of deaths such as: drowning, anaphylactic shock, hypothermia or any deaths related to alcohol or diabetes. Although these types of diagnosis become very difficult because of the changes to the body and biochemical measurements vary after death.

== See also ==
- Necrobiology
- Post-mortem interval
