= Jack Litman =

American lawyer

Jack Theodore Litman (July 26, 1943 – January 23, 2010) was a criminal defense lawyer most famous for his "blame the victim" defense of Robert Chambers, Jr. (the "Preppy Killer").

The son of a Jewish Belgian haberdasher and his wife, who together fled Europe the day before the Nazi invasion of Belgium, Litman was born in New York City. He attended Stuyvesant High School and Cornell University before enrolling in Harvard Law School, from which he graduated in 1967.

After a Fulbright scholarship in France he joined the Manhattan District Attorney's office under the leadership of Frank Hogan. He left the DA's office as deputy chief of the homicide bureau, and became a defense attorney.

He died at age 66 in January, 2010, of lymphoma, a disease he had for more than ten years.
