= Bonnie Garland murder case =

1977 murder in Scarsdale, New York, US

The murder of Bonnie Garland at the hands of Richard Herrin took place on July 7, 1977, in Scarsdale, New York. She was 20 years old.

== Details of the crime ==
In the early-morning hours of July 7, 1977, around 2 a.m. Yale graduate Richard Herrin bludgeoned his ex-girlfriend, Yale college senior Bonnie Garland, to death with a hammer as she lay sleeping in her parents' Scarsdale, New York, home because she wanted to end their relationship. The two college students had been dating for approximately two years at the time that Herrin graduated and moved to Texas to attend a graduate program. Over the next year Garland and Herrin grew apart. Garland wanted to date other people. Concerned about it, Herrin arranged, with Garland's knowledge, to come to Scarsdale to discuss their relationship. Her parents, not knowing there was trouble in the relationship, allowed him to stay at their home. Garland told Herrin on July 6, 1977, she wanted to break off their relationship. He was to leave the next day. He was staying in a guest room on the opposite end of the home.

During the early morning hours of July 7, 1977, Herrin went to a kitchen cabinet and found a hammer. He wrapped it in a towel to conceal it. He then went up three flights of stairs to Garland's room. As stated in the testimony, he left the hammer outside the door and went in to confirm she was asleep. He then went back out into the hallway, retrieved the hammer and towel, and returned to the room. He used the hammer to smash her skull and larynx. After attacking Garland, Herrin stole the Garland family car and drove around for hours. In the car, he smashed the rearview mirror to use the broken glass to self-harm. He ran out of gas in Coxsackie, 100 miles to the north of Scarsdale, where he found a church and told the priest inside of his murder. In fact, Bonnie was still alive though critically injured. The priest called the Scarsdale police, who knocked on the Garlands' door early in the morning. They entered her bedroom to find her horribly injured; she was declared dead at 10:38 that evening.

== Judicial proceedings ==
Herrin was arrested. A group led by members of the clergy of Yale's Catholic Church campaigned to have Herrin released on bail. They raised bail money and wrote letters attesting to Herrin's "good character" to the trial judge. Impressed by the campaign, the judge released Herrin into the care of the Christian Brothers in Albany. While he was awaiting trial, he attended classes at the State University of New York under an alias. Judge Richard J. Daronco presided over the highly publicized trial at the Westchester County Courthouse in White Plains. Richard Herrin was convicted of first-degree manslaughter, rather than second degree murder and was sentenced to the maximum penalty under the law. He served 17 years in state prison at the Wende Correctional Facility in Alden, New York, and was released on January 12, 1995.

Herrin was born to an Irish father and a Mexican mother in an ethnic minority community in Los Angeles. It was assumed that he was admitted to Yale through affirmative action, leading to the media designation of his trial as the "affirmative action murder trial".

Critics charged that the sentence was the result of the Yale community and, in particular, the Catholic chaplaincy uniting to support Herrin by portraying him as the victim of his upbringing in a minority neighborhood barrio in Los Angeles.

== Aftermath ==
After his release, Herrin moved to Socorro, New Mexico, where he was hired by a mental health foundation.

This was the last murder case in Scarsdale until the murder of 58-year-old pediatric doctor Robin Goldman on January 20, 2016.

== Sources ==
- The Yale Murder: The Compelling True Narrative of the Fatal Romance of Bonnie Garland and Richard Herrin, Peter Meyer
- The Killing of Bonnie Garland: A Question of Justice, Willard Gaylin
- True Stories of Law & Order by Kevin Dwyer and Juré Fiorillo
