= Mothers of Murdered Offspring =

Mothers of Murdered Offspring (MoMO) is a victims' rights organization in Charlotte, North Carolina. It was founded in March 1993 by Dee Sumpter and Judy Williams after the death of their daughter and god-daughter, Shawna Denise Hawk, on February 19, 1993. Mothers of Murdered Offspring was conceived in 1993 as a support group for survivors, at a time when Mecklenburg County had the highest record year for homicides: a total of 129. They were instrumental in bringing, their daughter's rapist and murderer serial killer Henry Louis Wallace, to justice and of his eventual conviction for his other crimes, as well as consoling the 11 murdered victims' families in addition to the families of murder victims since its inception.

The organization's first support meeting was held on March 29, 1993. Some of the organization's goals are to reach out to other mothers and families who have lost a child to the violent act of murder and to offer support during their time of sorrow and grief. The organization also provide purple ribbons, symbol of nonviolence to grieving families as well as balloon lifts.

== Articles ==
- "Well, he Ain't Getting No Victory Here Tonight and I Ain't" The Charlotte Observer, November 4, 2006
- Sumpter, Dee. "My Love and My Loss". Vol. 26, no. 9. Archived from the original on March 25, 2007 – via FindArticles.
- Mending Shattered Childhoods by Donna St. George, Washington Post
