= Cremation by country =

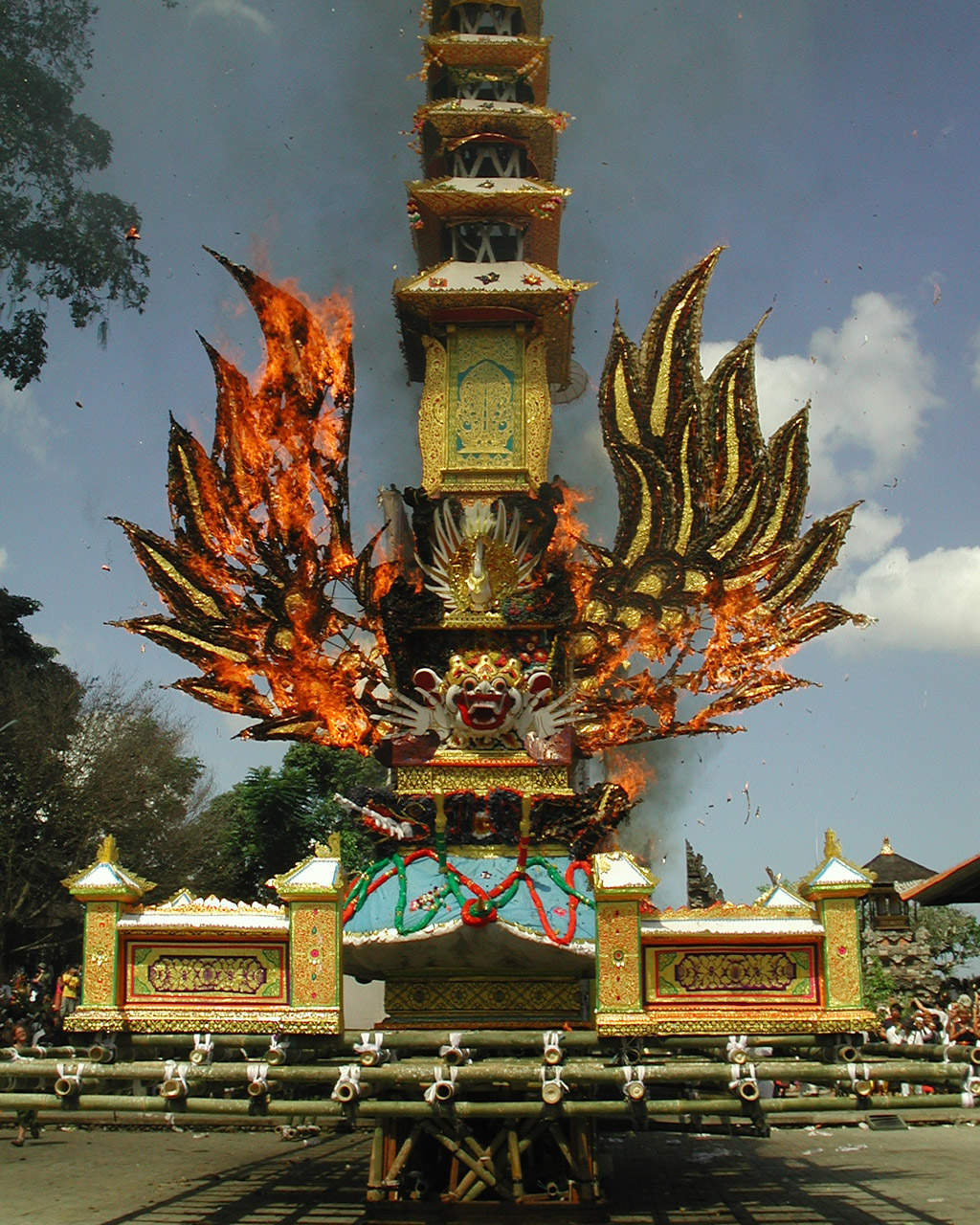
Funeral pyre in Ubud, Bali. Cremation is the preferred method of disposal of the dead in Buddhism.

Cremation rates vary widely across the world. As of 2019, international statistics report that countries with large Buddhist and Hindu populations like Bhutan, Cambodia, Hong Kong, Japan, Myanmar, Nepal, Sri Lanka, South Korea, Thailand, Vietnam and India have a cremation rate ranging from 80% to 99%, while Roman Catholic majority-countries like Italy, France, Ireland, Lithuania, Poland, Spain, and Portugal report much lower rates. Factors include both culture and religion; for example, the cremation rate in Muslim, Eastern Orthodox, Oriental Orthodox, and Roman Catholic majority countries is much lower due to religious sanctions on the practice of cremation, whereas for Hindu, Jain, and Buddhist majority countries the cremation rate is much higher.

Economic and environmental factors may also affect the popularity of cremation. In many countries, cremation rates have increased in the 20th and 21st centuries, in part due to the cost of cemetery fees, coffins, and funerals. Environmental concerns may also play a role in this trend. Cremation may be chosen over burial to avoid leaving embalming fluids and non-biodegradable material in the ground. On the other hand, since the 2000s, natural burial and water cremation have become increasingly popular alternatives to cremation, because of the large amount of greenhouse gases and soot emitted by cremation. Changes in lifestyle are thought to be another reason for the decline of burial. In the 21st century, fewer people live together on family plots of land or in rural communities, making it difficult to arrange a funeral quickly and requiring dedicated burial space to be purchased.

== Africa ==
=== Ghana ===
There is a crematorium in Accra, the capital of Ghana, but the cremation rate is low. Pentecostal Christians, which constitute the largest religious group in the country, are officially against cremation.

=== Kenya ===
Nairobi has the only crematorium in Kenya. Since Kenya is a Christian-majority country, the opposition against cremation largely derives from Christian beliefs about the practice.

=== Nigeria ===
Cremation is legal in the Lagos State of Nigeria.

=== South Africa ===
The rate of cremation is about 12% in Cape Town, which has a significant White population, but it is lower in other parts of the country.

=== Zimbabwe ===
Cremation is still considered taboo in Zimbabwe, but the practice is not forbidden. The Bulawayo City Council, the second largest city in the country, planned mandatory cremation for those that died before the age of 25. However, this plan was cancelled after many protests from Pentecostal Christian groups.

== Asia ==
=== China ===
Cremation was a widespread practice in the Song dynasty. The Ming and Qing dynasties sought to ban cremation on the grounds that it was opposed to Confucian principles (Buddhists, mainly in monasteries, continued cremation practices however).

The New Life Movement promoted cremation as a modern, rational, and hygienic practice.

In 1956, Mao Zedong declared that deceased people should be cremated instead of being buried to retain the amount of arable land.

The People's Republic of China reported 4,534,000 cremations out of 9,348,453 deaths (a 48.50% rate) in 2008. The cremation rate was 45.6% for 2014, according to the Chinese Ministry of Civil Affairs. In 2019, the cremation rate in China exceeded 50% for the first time.

=== India ===
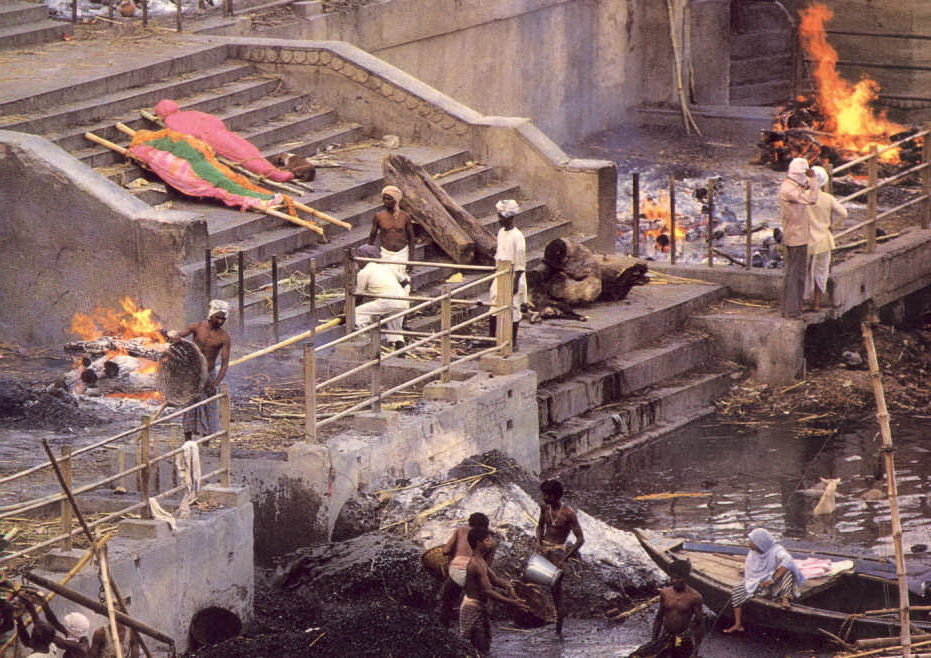
Burning ghats in Varanasi, India; the ashes of the dead are released along the banks of the River Ganges.

Almost all people in India adhering to Hinduism (79.8%), Sikhism (1.7%), Buddhism (0.7%) and Jainism (0.4%), along with half of India's 2.3% Christians, choose cremation as the method for disposing of the dead. However, with 14.2% of the population being Muslims (for whom cremation is not allowed) and with the many Christians and indigenous tribes who also prefer burial, the cremation rate in India is about 80% (Estimated in 2014).

=== Japan ===
Japan has one of the highest cremation rates in the world, with the country reporting a cremation rate of 99.97% in 2019.

=== Nepal ===
Almost everyone adhering to Hinduism and Buddhism cremates their dead, which makes Nepal one of the countries with the highest rate of cremation. The rate of cremation is around 95%.

=== Singapore ===
Given its tiny land area, Singapore has one of the highest cremation rates in the world, reporting a cremation rate of 80.54% in 2018.

=== South Korea ===
South Korea had the cremation rate of 92.1% in 2022. It is increasing as people born later are more likely to be cremated. About 94% of those under the age of 60 were cremated, with 99% of those in their 20s being cremated in 2014.

=== Taiwan ===
Taiwan has one of the highest cremation rates in the world, according to information from Ministry of Interior, the cremation rate was 92.47% in 2013, 144,162 of the 155,908 deaths that year.

== Europe ==
=== Belgium ===
The cremation rate in Belgium increased from 57% in 2015 to 71% in 2026; with Flanders having relatively more cremations than Brussels and Wallonia. The cremation rate in Flanders has increased from a little over 50% in 2010 to 81% in 2026. The numbers in Brussels may be artificially lower because inhabitants can be cremated in crematoria situated in Flanders. The higher proportion of Muslims is also a factor, due to the islamic prohibition on cremation. Wallonia is more traditional in its funeral methods and the larger distance to crematoria plays a part. In cities the proportion of people cremated is higher than in rural areas.

=== Bulgaria ===
Bulgaria has one of the lowest cremation rates in the world, reporting a cremation rate of 6.76% in 2021.

=== France ===
Cremation remains a minority practice in rural France where burial places are available, but is increasingly common in urban areas. In 1979 just 1% of funerals involved cremation: in 2012 it was 32%, rising to 45% in Paris.

=== Greece ===
Greece has one of the lowest cremation rates in the world, reporting a cremation rate of 2% in 2021. Despite strong opposition from the Greek Orthodox Church, cremation became legal in February 2016.

=== Hungary ===
Cremation recently became more popular than burial in Hungary: in 1996, the cremation rate was 27%, and in 2016, it was around 60%, with 70–90% in Budapest.

=== Ireland ===
Cremation has increased in Ireland in the last decade, largely due to the expense and limited availability of burial plots. In 2017, almost 20% of deaths in Ireland involved cremation. There are six crematoria in Ireland, three of which are in Dublin: Glasnevin (the first facility of its type in the country, established in 1982), Newlands Cross, and Harold's Cross. The remaining three are located in Cavan, Cork, and Shannon. Access to these facilities is not restricted by residency. Anyone may arrange for a cremation to take place at any of these locations.

=== Netherlands ===
The first cremation in the Netherlands was performed in 1914. In the hundred years since then the cremation rate has risen to 63% in 2014. It increased to 68% in 2024.

=== Nordic countries ===
Cremation rates in the Nordic countries vary, but have increased significantly since the 1940s. In 2025, the cremation rate in Denmark was 88.1%, in Sweden 86.0%, in Finland 68.6%, in Norway 53.4%, and in Iceland 46.8%. Countries like Denmark and Finland have used waste heat from cremations to warm nearby homes.

=== Portugal ===
The first crematorium in Portugal opened in 1925, but was closed in 1936. In 1985, it was reopened. Currently (2018 data), 20% of the deceased in Portugal are cremated. In 2005 that figure only reached 4.2%. In the country's capital, Lisbon, the number of cremations reached 54%.

=== Romania ===
Cremation is legal in Romania but discouraged by the Romanian Orthodox Church. Crematoriums are only located in Bucharest, Cluj-Napoca and Oradea. The country's first crematorium, Cenușa, opened in Bucharest in 1928. During the Communist period, many prominent figures, including Gheorghe Gheorghiu-Dej, Chivu Stoica, and Teohari Georgescu, were cremated there.

=== Russia ===
The first crematorium in Russia was built in Vladivostok in 1917, primarily for the cremations of Japanese people, who had a big population in this city. Later, the Donskoy crematorium was built in Moscow in 1927 and remained the only crematorium in the USSR until 1972, when the Nikolo-Archangelskiy crematorium in Moscow was commissioned. In 2021, there are 27 crematoriums in Russia.

The highest rate of cremations is in Moscow and Saint-Petersburg at about 50–70% of all deaths. In other large cities it is 20–25%, while the total cremation rate in Russia is about 10%. The reason for such a low prevalence of cremation is influenced by religious beliefs: the Russian Orthodox Church has a negative attitude towards cremation and both Islam and Orthodox Judaism prohibits it.

=== Spain ===
Cremations are increasing rapidly in Spain: in 2006, just 16% of deaths involved cremation, but by 2016 that figure had risen to 36%. Around half of all deceased are cremated in Barcelona. In 2019, the total number of deaths was 417,000, of which 44% were cremated. In 2023, the total number of deaths was 436,124, of which 47.8% were cremated.

=== United Kingdom ===
The cremation rate in the United Kingdom has been increasing steadily since the early 20th century, after having begun to accelerate in the 1930s. The national average rate was 0.07% in 1900, 0.15% in 1910, 0.24% in 1920, 0.87% in 1930, 3.85% in 1940, 15.59% in 1950, 34.70% in 1960, 55.41% in 1970, 65.26% in 1980, 69.58% in 1990, 71.51% in 2000, 73.13% in 2010, 78.46% in 2020, and 79.83% in 2022.

Cremations are most common in England and Wales, while still uncommon in Northern Ireland. The 2022 cremation rate was 82.40% for England and Wales, 71.66% for Scotland and only 23.00% for Northern Ireland. Catholic Church guidance argues that "cremation has developed as an option (in England and Wales) due to pressure on urban space and the lack of a tradition of re-using graves".

The Cremation Act 1902 (2 Edw. 7. c. 8) allowed burial authorities in England, Wales and Scotland to establish crematoria.

== North America ==
=== Canada ===
The cremation rate in Canada has been increasing steadily with the national average rate rising from 5.9% in 1970 to 68.4% in 2009. The rates vary greatly among the provinces with the 1999 province level statistics showing that British Columbia had the highest rate at 74%, while Prince Edward Island had the lowest rate at 8.5%.. In 2026,the rate has increased to 77%.

The Canadian rates for 2000:

Rank	Jurisdiction	Rate (%)
-	Canada	47.7%
1	British Columbia	75.7%
2	Yukon	58.8%
3	Alberta	53.8%
4	Ontario	48.6%
5	Manitoba	47.4%
6	Saskatchewan	37.6%
7	Nova Scotia	35.4%
8	Quebec	34.5%
9	New Brunswick	21.4%
10	Prince Edward Island	9.7%
	Newfoundland	N/A
	Northwest Territories	N/A
	Nunavut	N/A

According to the Cremation Association of North America, the percentage of deceased being cremated in Canada grew from 60.6% in 2009 to 76.7% in 2024.

=== United States ===
The cremation rate in the United States has been increasing steadily, with the national average rate rising from 3.56% in 1960 to 53.1% in 2018. The rates vary considerably among the states with the highest rates (over 70%) being reported in the Western United States with the lowest rates (under 30%) being reported in the Southern United States.

A survey by the Funeral and Memorial Information Council found that Americans increasingly choose cremation for the cost savings. In 1990, 19% reported this motivation; in 2010, one-third reported this motivation.

The 2014 cremation rate for each state and the District of Columbia, plus the national average:

2006 US cremation rates

Rank	Jurisdiction	Rate (%)
-	United States	47.0%
1	Nevada	75.9%
2	Washington	75.2%
3	Oregon	73.9%
4	Hawaii	72.6%
5	Maine	71.2%
6	Colorado	68.7%
7	Montana	68.6%
8	New Hampshire	68.0%
9	Wyoming	66.4%
10	Alaska	65.8%
11	Vermont	65.8%
12	Arizona	65.5%
13	Florida	62.7%
14	California	61.6%
15	Idaho	59.0%
16	New Mexico	57.8%
17	Minnesota	57.0%
18	Michigan	54.4%
19	Wisconsin	52.4%
20	Connecticut	51.3%
21	Delaware	45.2%
22	Kansas	45.2%
23	Massachusetts	43.1%
24	Pennsylvania	42.9%
25	Illinois	42.6%
26	Ohio	42.5%
27	Rhode Island	42.3%
28	Virginia	41.7%
29	Nebraska	41.3%
30	New Jersey	41.2%
31	District of Columbia	41.0%
32	New York	40.1%
33	Maryland	39.6%
34	Texas	39.5%
35	North Dakota	39.0%
36	Iowa	38.9%
37	Oklahoma	38.5%
38	South Carolina	38.1%
39	Missouri	37.9%
40	North Carolina	37.8%
41	Indiana	36.9%
42	Georgia	36.7%
43	South Dakota	35.9%
44	Arkansas	34.0%
45	West Virginia	30.4%
46	Tennessee	30.3%
47	Utah	29.7%
48	Louisiana	27.6%
49	Kentucky	24.6%
50	Alabama	22.9%
51	Mississippi	19.7%

The National Funeral Directors Association had a slightly different national cremation rate in the United States, reporting a 2016 rate of 50.2%. As of 2026,the number has increased to 64%.

== South America ==
Cremation rates vary from 2.16% in Colombia to 25.41% in Argentina.

== Oceania ==
The Cremation Society (UK) states that the cremation rate in Australia in 2018 was slightly over 69% of all deaths, whereas New Zealand's rate is slightly higher than Australia's, with a cremation rate in 2018 of 75% of all deaths.

== See also ==
- Antyesti
- Burial at sea
- Burial in space
- Cremation in Japan
- Death
- Promession
- Resomation
- Sati
- Self-immolation
- Tissue digestion
