= Human composting =

Ritual process of converting a deceased body into compost

Human composting (called natural organic reduction or terramation in legal codes and regulations) is a process for the final disposition of human remains in which microbes and organic material convert a deceased body into compost. Developed in the early 21st century as an environmentally sustainable alternative to burial and cremation, human composting is legally sanctioned in several US states and Sweden. Human composting has prompted much debate around environmental impacts, legalization, and religious considerations.

== Development and implementation ==
=== Impetus and development ===
In the 21st century, several factors led to the development of human composting as one of several proposals for alternative deathcare.

As described in the 1963 exposé The American Way of Death, the for-profit death care industry in the United States evolved after the Civil War to promote ostentatious and resource-intense funerary customs mainly for burial, including embalming with chemicals, expensive coffins, and highly decorated gravesites.

In the decades following the exposé, cremation grew in popularity as a simpler alternative, outnumbering burials nationwide by 2015. However, cremation itself has a number of environmental impacts, including the use of fossil fuels in retorts and the emissions released by combustion (which may include toxic mercury from dental amalgam).

Seeking ways to curtail the impact of deathcare, Katrina Spade (founder of the company Recompose) is credited with pursuing research on ways to accelerate decomposition using methods previously used with livestock. The process was the subject of scientific study at Washington State University in 2020.

=== Terminology ===
There are various terms for specific methods of composting human remains. These include terms defined in law codes:

- Natural organic reduction (NOR) or simply organic reduction, is the term adopted by the State of Washington after it became the first jurisdiction to legalize and regulate a form of human composting. Natural organic reduction is legally defined as "the contained, accelerated conversion of human remains to soil". This term and definition was subsequently adopted by other states in their own codes and regulations.
- Terramation is the term used in legislation passed into law in New South Wales. This term replaced references to "natural organic reduction" in a prior draft. The legislation in New South Wales defines terramation as "a process to provide for the controlled aerobic biological conversion of bodily remains into humus or humus-like products, and includes the removal of bones or another part of the bodily remains to be separately crushed, ground or otherwise reduced by kinetic or mechanical means with the resulting debris being mixed into the humus or humus-like products."

Private companies that perform natural organic reduction have trademarks and patents for specific methods of natural organic reduction. News reports have genericized these terms. These include:

- Recomposition is the term of art used in the US patent application by Katrina Spade and Recompose, PBC.
- Soil transformation is a trademark registered by the Earth Funeral Group, Inc.
- Terramation was originally a trademark registered by Return Home Inc. (formerly Adamah, Inc.) registered in the United States.

=== Methods ===
Composting is an aerobic method of decomposing organic solid matter to recycle it. The process involves decomposing organic material into a humus-like material, known as compost, which can add nutrients to soil. Composting organisms require four equally important ingredients to work effectively: carbon, nitrogen, oxygen and water.

As described in their patent application and news reports, Recompose's method entails placement of human corpses in a container along with a composting feedstock of plant material. In reports, this is described as a mixture of woodchips, straw and alfalfa. Recompose estimates they use 729 cubic feet (20.6 m^{3}) of plant material. The mixture is aerated (and optionally rotated) to encourage the temperature of the mixture to rise until thermophile microbes decompose the body and the feedstock. In addition to developing the composting process itself, Spade worked with engineer Oren Bernstein to design containers and frames to compost several bodies within a single complex.

Other companies use similar processes, with some differing details. In a Popular Science article, Return Home describes custom-built machinery to turn the container and continue decomposition. The company Earth Funeral uses a feedstock that includes mulch and wildflowers. Herland Forest utilizes composting vessels in an outdoor setting rather than in a climate-controlled indoor environment.

In this manner, the reduction of remains to soil may take place in as little as 1–2 months. Recompose estimates that per person, their process yields soil in the amount of 27 cubic feet (0.76 m^{3}) by volume and 1,000 pounds (450 kg) by weight.

Based on a customer's preferences, a portion of compost from natural organic reduction can be returned to loved ones in containers and scattered, similar to cremated ash. Recompose and Return Home each donate soil to conservation forests.

=== Precautions and contraindications ===
Disposition of human bodies through composting has a number of health, safety and legal requirements and restrictions.

==== Pathogen control ====
The United States Environmental Protection Agency standardized "Processes to Further Reduce Pathogens" (PFRP) under 40 CFR 503.B. This requires within-vessel composting to achieve a temperature of 55 °C (131 °F) sustained for over 3 days. This temperature is also required to reduce the presence of pharmaceuticals, antibiotics, and chemotherapy drugs.

Persons with certain diseases (such as tuberculosis, Creutzfeldt–Jakob disease, and ebola) are ineligible for human composting due to pathogens that may survive the temperatures of the composting process.

==== Remains requiring special handling ====
Although bones decay, they do so more slowly than soft tissue. In human composting, bones are removed in the middle of the process to be pulverized using mechanical equipment and integrated back into the soil. This equipment and approach is identical to procedures used in Western crematories to reduce bones to dust for inclusion with funerary ashes.

Medical implants with batteries (such as pacemakers) or radioactive materials (such as brachytherapy seeds) pose risks that require removal before a body is composted. Metals (such as those from hip replacement) must also be removed from composted remains before use as compost.

==== Restrictions on placement ====
In Washington, regulations require testing composted remains for levels of toxins, including arsenic, cadmium, lead, mercury, and selenium. Remains exceeding limits may not be released into the environment.

States that legalized the process of natural organic reduction simultaneously restricted the handling and disposition of organically reduced human remains. The state of Colorado prohibits growing food with soil from human remains. The state of California allows state or local agencies to prohibit scattering in specific areas.

== Activism for legalization ==
Proponents say human composting is more economical, environmentally friendly, and respectful of the body and the earth than the methods of disposal that are typically practiced in technologically advanced societies. Cremation uses fossil fuels or large amounts of wood for funeral pyres (both of which generate polluting smoke and release large amounts of carbon), and conventional burial is land-intensive, has a high carbon footprint, and frequently involves disposing of bodily fluids and liquified organs in the sewer and injecting the body with toxic embalming chemicals. By contrast, human composting, like natural burial, is a natural process and contributes ecological value by preserving the body's nutrient material. While energy is still required for human composting facility operations, it only uses an eighth of energy than that required for cremation.

Human composting tends to be less expensive compared to cremation and traditional burials, typically costing between $3,000 and $7,000 compared to $7,000–12,000 (burial) and $4,000–7,000 (cremation).

Author and YouTuber Caitlin Doughty, writing in favor of legalization in New York state, argues that the process "fulfills many people's desire to nurture the earth after dying." An editorial in Undark Magazine argues that "natural organic reduction respects the human body and spirit, supports rather than sullies the earth, and works with nature rather than against it".

== Religious views ==
As human composting is contemplated and legalized in more jurisdictions, its compatibility with religious beliefs has been debated.

=== Christian ===
==== Catholic Church ====
The Catholic Church in the United States has lobbied legislators against the legalization of human composting.

The Catholic Church interprets the Nicene Creed to uphold a universal resurrection of earthly remains. The Church began sanctioning cremation in 1963, but the 1983 Code of Canon Law forbids church funerals to cremations held "for anti-christian motives" that deny the resurrection. The Dicastery for the Doctrine of the Faith elaborates that respect for remains, whether buried or cremated, requires their placement intact to "cemeteries or other sacred places", and says that scattering of remains gives "appearance of pantheism, naturalism or nihilism".

The National Catholic Register published a dissenting opinion from Saint Louis University professor in bioethics Jason T. Eberl that human composting is compatible with Catholic teaching. Specifically, he argued it should be in line with the Pope Francis on environmentalism in Laudato si' and on preferential option for the poor in Evangelii gaudium. Eberl concludes that "a body that has been naturally organically reduced could also be interred in the same fashion or utilized as soil in a designated, blessed area to foster new life that will be memorialized by future generations, fulfilling in a more direct way the Biblical declaration that we are dust and to dust we shall return (Genesis 3:19)."

In 2024, following the legalization of human composting in several states, the Catholic Cemetery Conference advised its members that "with agreement of its Bishop Catholic cemetery may allow for inscribing the name of the deceased loved one on a family memorial, preceded by 'In Loving Memory of' or as explicitly allowed by the cemetery rules and regulations." The Conference also reiterated that "the Catholic church does not promote or endorse the use of Human Composting."

==== Protestant ====
In 2023, the Church of England stated that it is considering the theological, practical and pastoral issues of the practice.

The Episcopal News Service profiled human composting as part of a review of American Episcopalians' growing interest in novel funerary practices.

=== Judaism ===
Orthodox Jewish interpretations of Halakha religious law require burial of the dead and have opposed cremation. As the state of New York contemplated legalization, The Forward sought rabbinical opinions about the status of human composting.

- Speaking for Agudath Israel of America, Rabbi Avi Shafran voiced opposition to "'utilizing' a body as a growth medium."
- Rabbi Joseph Potasnik of the interdenominational New York Board of Rabbis argued that it lacks appropriate reverence for the dead (kavod hamet).
- Rabbi Jeremy Kalmanofsky of the Conservative movement synagogue Ansche Chesed expressed that the use of soil from organically reduced human remains constitutes a forbidden profiting from a body.
- Reconstructionist Rabbi Seth Goldstein says human composting "seems more in line with Jewish practice than cremation in terms of the practices and values that surround it" and believed in its environmental benefits gave merit.
- When asked for an opinion the Union for Reform Judaism gave no comment.

The Jewish Montefiore Cemetery and New Montefiore Cemetery in Long Island, New York, forbid the scattering of organically reduced remains, as they also do with cremated remains.

=== Islam ===
The Pacific Sun asked for the stance of Council of American Islamic Relations concerning California's legalization of human composting. The organization's deputy executive director replied that parts of the process are "prohibited under Islamic law" but that Islamic scholars "also recognize that every deceased person has the right to be buried in accordance with their own wishes or faith traditions".

== Legal status ==
Composting of human remains has required explicit authorization from jurisdictions with changes to environmental and professional licensing. Washington was the first US state to legalize, regulate, and license the practice as natural organic reduction.

=== United States ===
States which allow human composting

In the United States, rapid human composting has become legally allowed or approved to become allowed in the future in fourteen states as of 2025.

| State | Approval Date | Effect Date | Notes | Sources |
|---|---|---|---|---|
| Washington | May 2019 | May 1, 2020 | | |
| Colorado | May 2021 | August 8, 2021 | | |
| Oregon | June 2021 | January 1, 2023 | | |
| Vermont | June 2022 | January 1, 2022 | | |
| California | September 18, 2022 | 2027 | Residents seeking human composting before effect date often have their remains transported to nearby legal states, such as Washington. | |
| New York | December 31, 2022 | August 7, 2024 | In February 2026, Green-Wood Cemetery announced itself as the first cemetery in the state to offer natural organic reduction as a service. | |
| Nevada | May 2023 | January 1, 2024 | | |
| Arizona | April 2024 | | | |
| Delaware | May 2024 | May 2024 | | |
| Maryland | May 2024 | October 2024 | Elkridge hosts the first licensed natural organic reduction facility in the eastern United States, owned by Earth Funeral Home. | |
| Minnesota | May 2024 | July 2025 | | |
| Maine | August 2024 | August 2024 | | |
| Georgia | May 2025 | July 2025 | | |
| New Jersey | September 2025 | July 2026 | | |

As of August 2025, an additional fifteen states' legislatures have introduced bills to legalize human composting.

==== Professional and business licensing and training ====
Although the above states have legalized the practice of natural organic reduction, as of 2025 it is only a few states that have completed rulemaking and professional licensing.

In Washington, the Funeral and Cemetery Board of the Department of Licenses licenses practitioners natural organic reduction as a sub-specialty of "reduction facility operators" alongside practitioners of cremation and alkaline hydrolysis. A similar approach is taken to facilities.

The Cremation Association of North America provides certificates of training for those seeking licenses.

==== Federal government ====
===== Federal Trade Commission =====
The Funeral Rule (16 CFR 453) enacted by the Federal Trade Commission is a US federal regulation protecting consumers by requiring funeral providers provide information concerning their goods and services. In 2020, the Commission underwent a formal review of the Rule.

In 2022, the Federal Trade Commission published the results of its review, including a section on "New Forms of Disposition" including natural organic reduction, stating:

The Commission is considering modifying the Rule to explicitly include new methods of disposition, such as alkaline hydrolysis and human natural organic reduction. The Rule could then clarify that such providers could offer direct or immediate services with a reduced basic services fee. The Commission is also considering updating the Rule to adapt to new methods of disposition, for example the Rule requirements to offer and provide disclosures about alternative containers for direct services. The Commission wants to ensure the Rule does not stifle innovation and believes the proposed changes help level the playing field for providers of new alternative methods.

In 2023 the FTC sponsored a panel to discuss natural organic reduction and other new forms of disposition.

===== United States National Cemetery System =====
The administrator of the United States National Cemetery System of the United States Department of Veterans Affairs (VA) has authorized the placement of "a portion of remains transformed by natural organic reduction" in in-ground burial sections (including green burial sections) and designated scatter gardens at VA national cemeteries that have these options. Those whose remains are scattered or interred in this way may be eligible for memorial markers.

=== Canada ===
A National Collaborating Centre for Environmental Health study funded by the Public Health Agency of Canada notes that while Canada has yet to legalize the process, "Canadians can access the service in US states such as Washington, the first North American jurisdiction to make it legal." The study notes that the Canadian government should "consider whether inspection or restrictions on the end use of compost transported across borders is required, from jurisdictions where the process is currently permitted, to jurisdictions where it is not".

=== European Union ===
A 2023 Euronews report noted that within the European Union no national-level government has legalized composting of human remains.

==== Germany ====
The German state of Schleswig-Holstein approved a pilot for a human composting process as reerdigung ("reburial"). The term "reburial" has appeared as a generic term in the German Handbook of Cemetery and Burial Law since 2021. The Berlin-based firm Curriculum Vitae offers reburial services under the name Meine Erde ("My Earth"). The company will export their designs to the United States through a partnership with Green-Wood Cemetery in Brooklyn, New York.

==== France ====
In 2024, a research project funded by the French National Research Agency and jointly conducted by the organization Humo Sapiens, the University of Bordeaux, and University of Lille began in with an aim toward a working prototype process by 2026. In 2023, Élodie Jacquier-Laforge authored legislation to legalize the process in the National Assembly.

==== Belgium ====
Groups active in France and Belgium are campaigning for legalization of the process under the name "humusation". Brussels politician Bernard Clerfayt stated his opposition to local legalization.

==== Netherlands ====
In May 2020, the Health Council of the Netherlands issued an advisory report on the admissibility of new techniques of disposing of the dead. It found that "the available information on human composting is, as yet, insufficient to make possible an assessment". The report reviewed existing guidance in European regulatory frameworks and reports from European institutions about animal composting. It cites a European Food Safety Authority for composting of dead-on-farm pigs, in which the composted remains are sent for incineration and not release into the environment. The Council reiterated its advice against permitting the practice in a report to the Ministry of the Interior and Kingdom Relations.

=== Sweden ===
Human composting is currently legal in Sweden, following a process commonly known as "promession", developed by Susanne Wiigh-Mäsak (found of the company Promessa). In this process, the body is cooled to 0 °F (−18 °C) and then exposed to liquid nitrogen. Once frozen, the body is then vibrated until turned to a fine dust, which is then freeze dried and separated from metals. This remaining material is then placed biodegradable container and buried in shallow soil, where it naturally breaks down over 6 to 12 months.

=== United Kingdom ===
Deborah Smith of the UK's National Association of Funeral Directors noted that human composting has not been undertaken in the United Kingdom, though natural burials are currently legal.

As part of its 13th Programme of Law Reform, the Law Commission for England and Wales is considering regulations for human composting among other new funerary methods. The project started at the beginning of 2024 and will run until spring 2026. It will end with a final report and draft Bill.

=== Australia ===
In October 2026, the Parliament of New South Wales passed the Public Health Amendment (Terramation) Bill 2026, making New South Wales the first Australian state to take the steps toward legal composting of human remains. Notably, the bill (written by Alex Greenwich) changed references to "natural organic reduction" to "terramation" at the prompting of the Chris Minns-led government. Two years have been allotted for the government to devise environmental regulations before terramations may be performed.

== In popular culture ==
Since the legalization of human composting, entertainment news outlets have reported celebrities who stated their intent to have their remains composted.

In 2025, composting as a deathcare option gained widespread attention when television personality and businesswoman Martha Stewart publicly stated her wish to be composted in a manner similar to the horses on her Bedford, New York farm.

In 2026, actress Kim Novak who lives in Oregon announced deathcare plans would include the composting of her remains as soil for tree planting, and that "it's given me great peace of mind because I'm going to keep growing."

Following the death of Sid Krofft, his official puppet likeness announced on Instagram that his body was being composted by Earth Funeral.

== See also ==
- Bibliography about the history of death and funerary practices
