= Anderson-McQueen =

Funeral home in Florida, U.S.

- Type: Private
- Industry: Funeral home
- Founded: 1952 in St. Petersburg, Florida
- Founder: John S. Anderson; William F. McQueen
- Headquarters: St. Petersburg, Florida, United States
- Services: Funeral ceremonies; cremation services; Pet death services
- Owner: Foundation Partners Group
- Website: www.andersonmcqueen.com

Anderson-McQueen Company is a privately owned funeral home headquartered in St. Petersburg, Florida. It is owned and operated by the second-generation McQueen family and serves Florida's Hillsborough and Pinellas Counties region with six service facilities. Anderson-McQueen is the first funeral home in the United States to practice flameless cremation.

== History ==
John S. Anderson and William F. McQueen founded Anderson-McQueen Funeral Home in 1952. The original Anderson-McQueen Funeral Home was established in a residential St. Petersburg home and now houses Anderson-McQueen's Northeast St. Petersburg Tribute Center, one of Anderson-McQueen's six operating facilities.

After the death of co-founder, John Anderson in 1970, William McQueen assumed sole ownership of the business. In 1984, McQueen invested in a portion of St. Petersburg's Sunnyside Cemetery, established in 1895, that stretches three blocks.(USGenWeb) McQueen's three children succeeded ownership of the business after his death in 1987.

In 1990, The McQueen's acquired the Bobbitt-Gunter Funeral Chapel, now known as Anderson-McQueen's Tyrone Family Tribute Center located in the Tyrone/Gulf Beach area. Later, they purchased the Alan R. McLeod Funeral Chapel located in the St. Petersburg suburb of Meadowlawn in 1994 from Alan and Carole McLeod.

In 1997, Anderson-McQueen opened St. Petersburg's first on-site crematory. The facility included both a reception and visitation space located within the crematorium. The reception facility has since been converted to the Bio-Cremation room.

John T. McQueen became president and CEO of Anderson-McQueen in 2010 after buying out his brother and sister from the family's funeral & cemetery operations. Previously, he was the company's vice president and COO, as well as the owner of the Sunnyside Cemetery and founder of Affordable Memorials.

In 2017, John and his wife, Nikki McQueen, sold Anderson-McQueen Funeral Homes to Foundation Partners Group. The duo made the decision to sell Anderson-McQueen and its subsidiaries because their son, Joshua McQueen was unsure about taking over the family business. John and Nikki's sale and retirement marked the end of Anderson-McQueen Funeral Homes being the largest family owned in the state of Florida.

== Operations ==
Anderson-McQueen is known for their unique services that in the past have included the releasing of butterflies, and using in-house audiovisual technologies to create graphically enhanced memorial and tribute presentations. The Anderson-McQueen on-site crematorium also permits families and designated guests to witness the initial phase of cremation preparation upon request.

The vehicle fleet includes "Glory Ride" a Harley Davidson modified hearse pulled by a Harley model motorcycle, as well as a restored 1895 horse-drawn hearse. Webcasts are also made available to accommodate guests unable to attend services.

In addition to its use of audio-visual technology for creating personalized memorial tributes, Anderson-McQueen launched its online radio show "Undertaking" in 2014 where host John McQueen interviews other industry experts on various end of life issues. Also in 2014, Anderson-McQueen introduced its mobile app on the iOS app store to provide individuals on the go with easy access to funeral related questions, obituaries and online memorial donations.

=== Pet death care ===
In 2006, John and his wife Nikki McQueen founded Pet Passages, an addition of Anderson-McQueen that provides funeral and cremation services to the pet community of Pinellas County. In 2013, Pet Passages surpassed its human counterpart in death care services.

=== Special services ===
After the state of Florida added the term "consumable" to rephrase existing statute regulating burial and cremation policies and procedures in 2009, Anderson-McQueen Funeral Home became the industry's first to carry out a flameless cremation.

Flameless cremation is an alternative to the traditional cremation process that substitutes water in place of flames. Flameless cremation, also known as bio-cremation, works through a process called Alkali Hydrolysis which uses a compounded liquid solution that is 95 percent water and five percent potassium hydroxide (KOH). The body is submerged into the "Resomator," a special chamber developed by Glasgow-based manufacturer Resumation. The practice was permitted after mortuary scientists and cremation specialists demonstrated to state and city officials that the residue left behind following the bio cremation process could be diluted to a soluble liquid with a measurable pH level not exceeding 11.5.

== See also ==
- Funeral home
- Alkaline hydrolysis (death custom)
