= Recompose =

- Type: Public-benefit corporation
- Industry: Deathcare
- Founded: 2017
- Founder: Katrina Spade
- Headquarters: Seattle, WA
- Website: www.recompose.life

Recompose is a public benefit corporation founded by designer and death care advocate Katrina Spade in 2017, building upon her 2014 non-profit organization Urban Death Project.

Recompose is a Washington state based company offering a death care service to convert human bodies into soil through a process known as natural organic reduction, or human composting. The process, which takes about 30 days, is marketed as a green alternative to the existing disposal options of cremation and burial.

== The Recompose Process ==
=== How it Works ===
Recompose has a patent pending process where bodies are placed in a vessel with natural materials such as wood chips and alfalfa. A fan system is set up to provide air that ensures enough oxygen is getting to the body, and the soft tissue breaks down in about a month, transforming into about two wheelbarrows worth of soil. Families of the deceased can keep the soil, use it to plant a tree, or through a partnership with Forterra, Washington's largest land conservation organization, can donate soil to help rehabilitate forest land in Washington State.

=== Safety ===
To prove natural organic reduction as safe and effective, Recompose participated in a study with Western Washington University designed and managed by soil scientist Lynne Carpenter-Boggs. Six donors participated in the study and Boggs, who is working for recompose as a paid advisor, indicated the result "was clean, rich, odorless soil that passed all federal and state safety guidelines for potentially hazardous pathogens and pollutants, such as metals".

== History ==
=== Origins ===
Recompose founder Spade was raised in rural New Hampshire by a family who wasn't religious, but found spirituality in nature.

Considering her own mortality Spade wanted more options that were less toxic, environmentally and economically friendly, and options that allowed family and friends to participate in the care of their loved one. She formulated early ideas about the possibility of human recomposition but when she learned about the practice of livestock mortality composting, she began work to create the same option for humans.

Katrina Spade was awarded the Echoing Green Climate Fellowship for this work in 2014.

=== Urban Death Project ===
Urban Death Project was founded in 2014. It formed a partnership with Western Carolina University's Forensic Anthropology Department.

Urban Death Project's Kickstarter Campaign raised $91,000 from over 1200 Backers in 2015.

Research began in 2016 with Washington State University's Soil Science Department led by Lynne-Carpenter Boggs, PhD, Associate Professor of Sustainable and Organic Agriculture., while law students at Wake Forest University school of law examined the legal hurdles.

In 2017 Urban Death Project's Western Carolina University Forensic Anthropology partnership was featured in Caitlin Doughty's bestseller From Here to Eternity; Traveling the World to Find the Good Death.

In 2017 the non-profit Urban Death Project dissolved and Recompose (a benefit corporation) was founded.

=== Facility ===
After Washington State legalized natural organic reduction in 2020, Recompose opened its first facility on December 20, 2020 outside of Seattle, Washington. The original plan for a 18,500-square-foot facility, designed by architecture firm Olson Kundig, housing 75 vessels "arranged to surround a large, airy gathering space were put on hold due to COVID 19. Instead, a much smaller location which Spade describes as “a workhorse facility” that holds only 10 vessels and has no public-gathering space opened in Kent, Washington. However, friends and chosen family of the deceased can watch that laying-in process over a livestream.

== External Websites ==
- Recompose.life
