= Sunnyside Cemetery (St. Petersburg) =

Cemetery home in Florida, U.S.

Coordinates: 27°49′15″N 82°39′38″W

- Type: Private
- Industry: Cemetery
- Founded: 1895 in St. Petersburg, Florida
- Headquarters: St. Petersburg, Florida, United States
- Services: Cemetery ceremonies; cremation services; Pet death services
- Owner: Foundation Partners Group
- Website: www.andersonmcqueen.com

Sunnyside Cemetery, located in St. Petersburg, Florida, is third oldest cemetery in the city. It was established in 1895 and sits across the street from Northeast High School.

== History ==
Sunnyside Cemetery was originally known as the Ellis Graveyard, named after its founder, Nathaniel Ellis. The cemetery was reserved only for the family members of founder Ellis. In 1904, the cemetery's new owner, John O’Berry, formed the Sunnyside Cemetery Association. By the following year, Sunnyside Cemetery opened to the public. In 1984, Anderson-McQueen invested in a portion of St. Petersburg's Sunnyside Cemetery that stretches three blocks. Anderson-McQueen expanded the cemetery by buying the neighboring lot to the west, but did not alter the original section's aesthetics. In 2010, John McQueen became president and CEO of Anderson-McQueen after buying out his brother and sister from the family's funeral & cemetery operations. After this buyout, the business continued to be run by family members, like his son, Joshua McQueen, who spent summers working at the cemetery. In 2024, the cemetery is partnered with Anderson McQueen, but Anderson McQueen is now owned by Foundation Partner's Group. Today, this St. Petersburg landmark remains a quaint and historically rich cemetery for families throughout the community.

== Lawsuit ==
When the cemetery was sold to Anderson McQueen Funeral Home, the O’Berry family added a covenant in the sale stating the historic section's layout not be changed, specifically stating that the gravel path could not be removed or replaced with concrete. After Anderson McQueen was sold to Foundation Partner's Group in 2017, the new owners decided to alter the historic section's gravel path in order to add more grave spaces, creating 184 additional burial plots in the path's footprint. They sold 82 of those new plots, 24 of which were occupied at the time of the case. This led to a court case between the cemetery's founding family and current owner over whether burials are allowed in a section of Sunnyside at 5300 19th St. N. A judge with Pinellas County's Sixth Judicial Circuit Court decided the burials breached a decades-old contract, but delayed an order to move the graves, since this would cause up to 24 graves to be exhumed. Instead, the two sides and the burial plot owners were ordered to find try and another solution. After many discussions, FPG and O'Berry's decedents seemed to come to an agreement. Parking Pads and a gravel walking path would be added as a temporary fix, but a more permanent fix would come with a cemetery expansion that included a new access to the historic side of the cemetery.
