= Caitlin Doughty =

YouTube personality, author and mortician (born 1984)

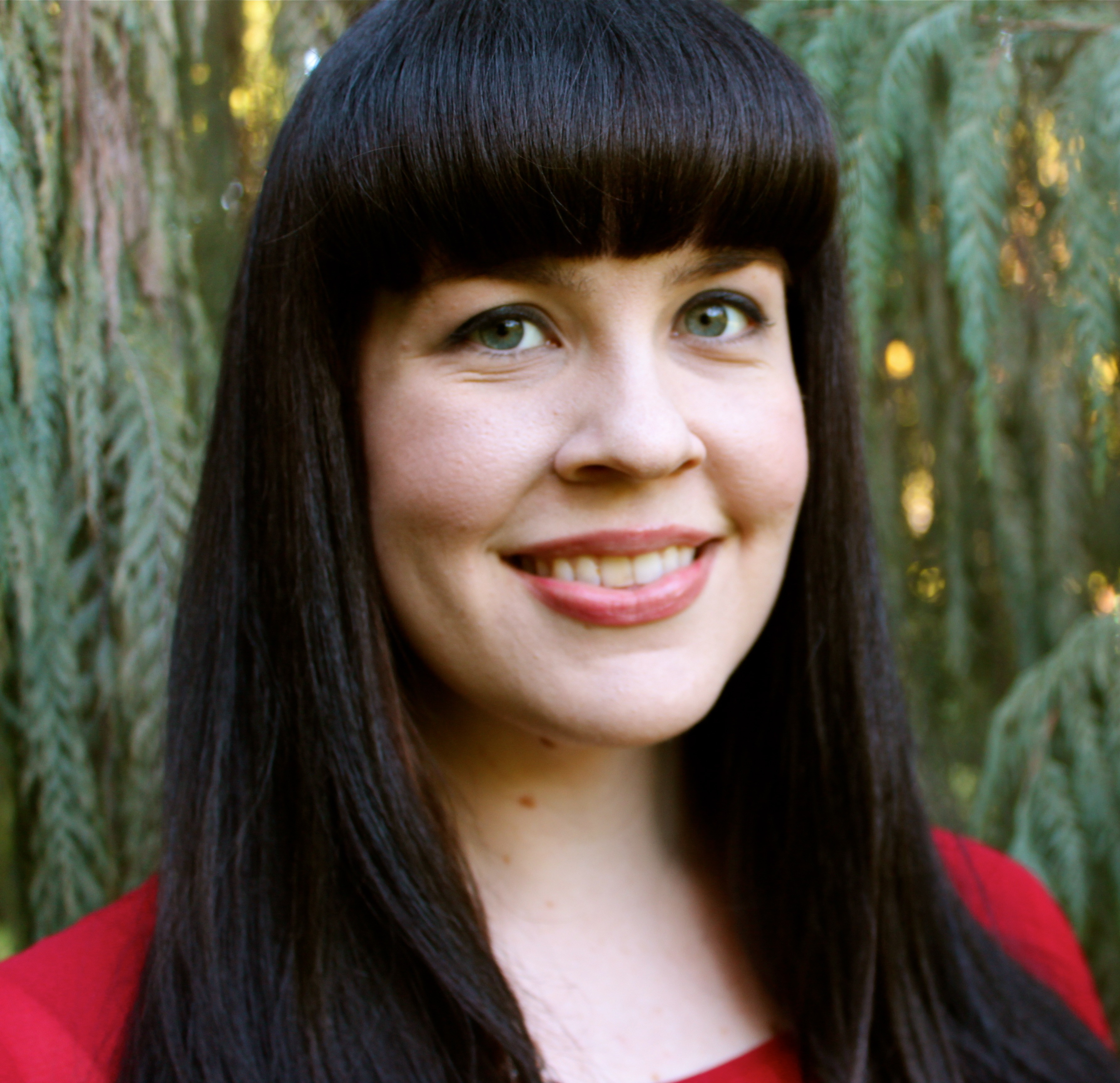
- Doughty in June 2014
- Born: August 19, 1984 (age 42); Oʻahu, Hawaii, U.S.
- Education: University of Chicago (BA); Cypress College (AS)
- Occupations: YouTuber; mortician; author; blogger; advocate
- Notable work: Smoke Gets in Your Eyes & Other Lessons from the Crematory; From Here to Eternity; Traveling the World to Find the Good Death; Will My Cat Eat My Eyeballs?: Big Questions from Tiny Mortals About Death; Dead in the Water: The Lost Passengers of the Titanic

YouTube information
- Channel: Caitlin Doughty
- Years active: 2011–present
- Genre: Death education
- Subscribers: 2.12 million
- Views: 300 million
- Last updated: August 22, 2026
- Website: caitlindoughty.com orderofthegooddeath.com

Caitlin Marie Doughty (born August 19, 1984) is an American mortician, author, blogger, YouTuber, and advocate for death acceptance and the reform of Western funeral industry practices. She is the owner of Clarity Funerals and Cremation of Los Angeles, creator of the Web series Ask a Mortician, founder of The Order of the Good Death, and author of three bestselling books, Smoke Gets in Your Eyes & Other Lessons from the Crematory (2014), From Here to Eternity; Traveling the World to Find the Good Death (2017), and Will My Cat Eat My Eyeballs?: Big Questions from Tiny Mortals About Death (2019).

== Early life ==
Doughty grew up in Kaneohe, Oahu, Hawaii, where she had no exposure to death until, at age 8, she witnessed another child fall to her death from a balcony at a shopping mall. She was quickly taken from the scene of the accident and it was never spoken of again. For several years, she became obsessed with fears of her own or her family's deaths. Doughty says she could have recovered better from the incident if she had been given the opportunity to face the reality of the child's death.

Doughty attended St. Andrew's Priory School, a private Episcopal all-girls college prep school in Honolulu. In college she majored in medieval history at the University of Chicago, focusing on death and culture, graduating in 2006. She studied the European witch trials in the early modern period, and directed a play she had written based on the works of Edgar Allan Poe and the Christina Rossetti poem "Goblin Market".

== Early career in the death industry ==
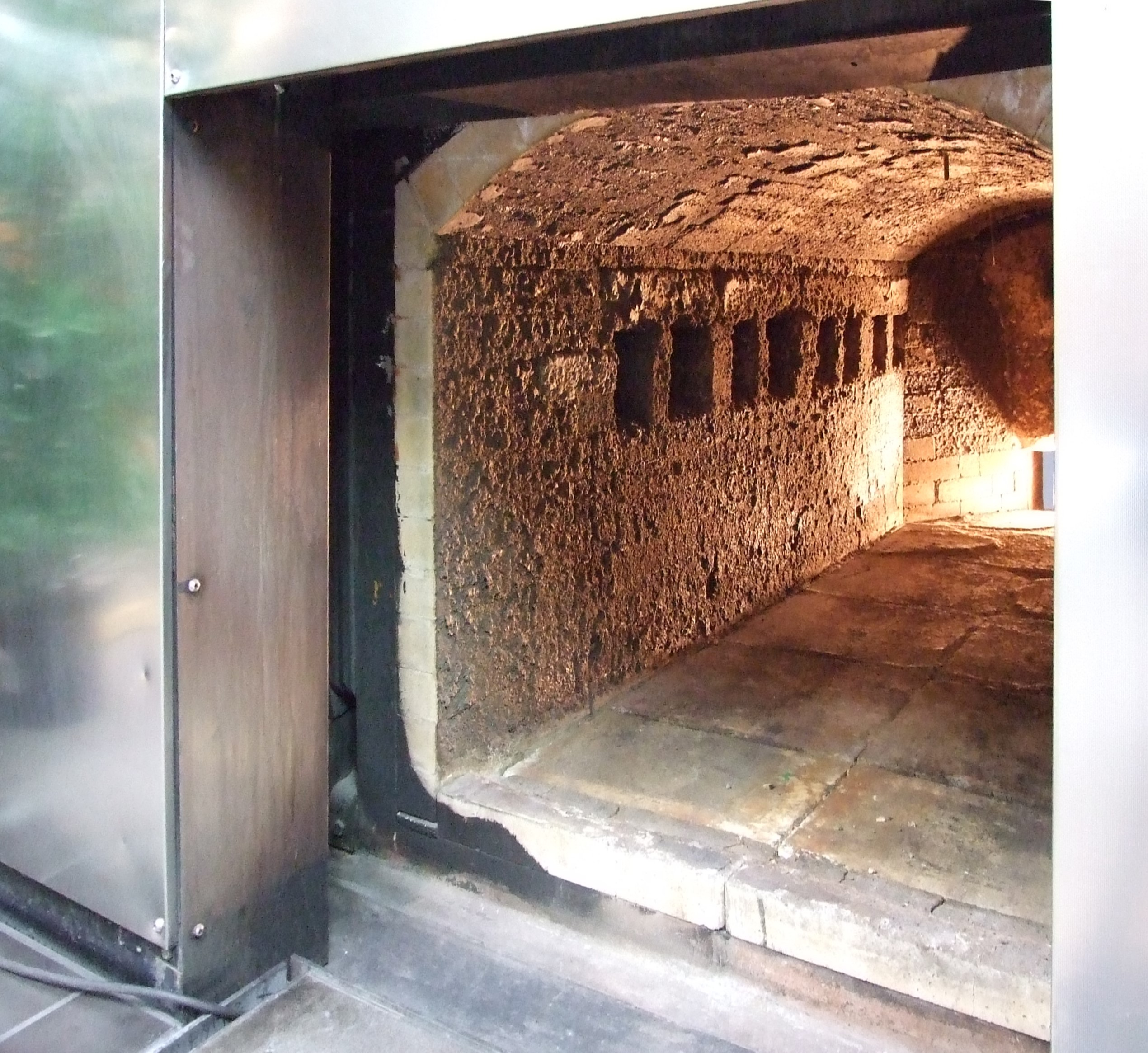
Furnace chamber of a retort or crematory

After graduation and moving to San Francisco in 2006, at age 22, she sought hands-on exposure to modern death practices in funeral homes, and was hired in the crematory of Pacific Interment (called Westwind Cremation & Burial in her book) despite her lack of any experience in the funeral industry. Pacific Interment could be called "the anti-Forest Lawn", referring to what Doughty sees as the theme-park-like, kitschy corporate funeral behemoth that much of modern American funeral practice is modeled on. She picked up corpses from homes and hospitals in a van, prepared them for viewings, cremated them, and delivered the cremains to the families. Dealing with bureaucracy, such as acquiring death certificates or obtaining the release of a body from the coroner, occupied much of her work. Her supervisor and coworkers at Pacific Interment often tested her with hands-on assignments, as on her first day at work she had to shave a corpse, and Doughty accepted any task.

Doughty has said she knew almost from the beginning of her work in the death industry that she wanted to change attitudes about death and find a way to offer alternative funeral arrangements. After one year at the crematory, Doughty attended Cypress College's Mortuary Science program and graduated as a certified mortician, though in California there are paths to becoming licensed without attending mortuary college. She founded The Order of the Good Death, an association of like-minded death professionals, along with artists, writers, and academics who shared her goals of reforming Western attitudes about death, funerals, and mourning.

== Advocacy ==
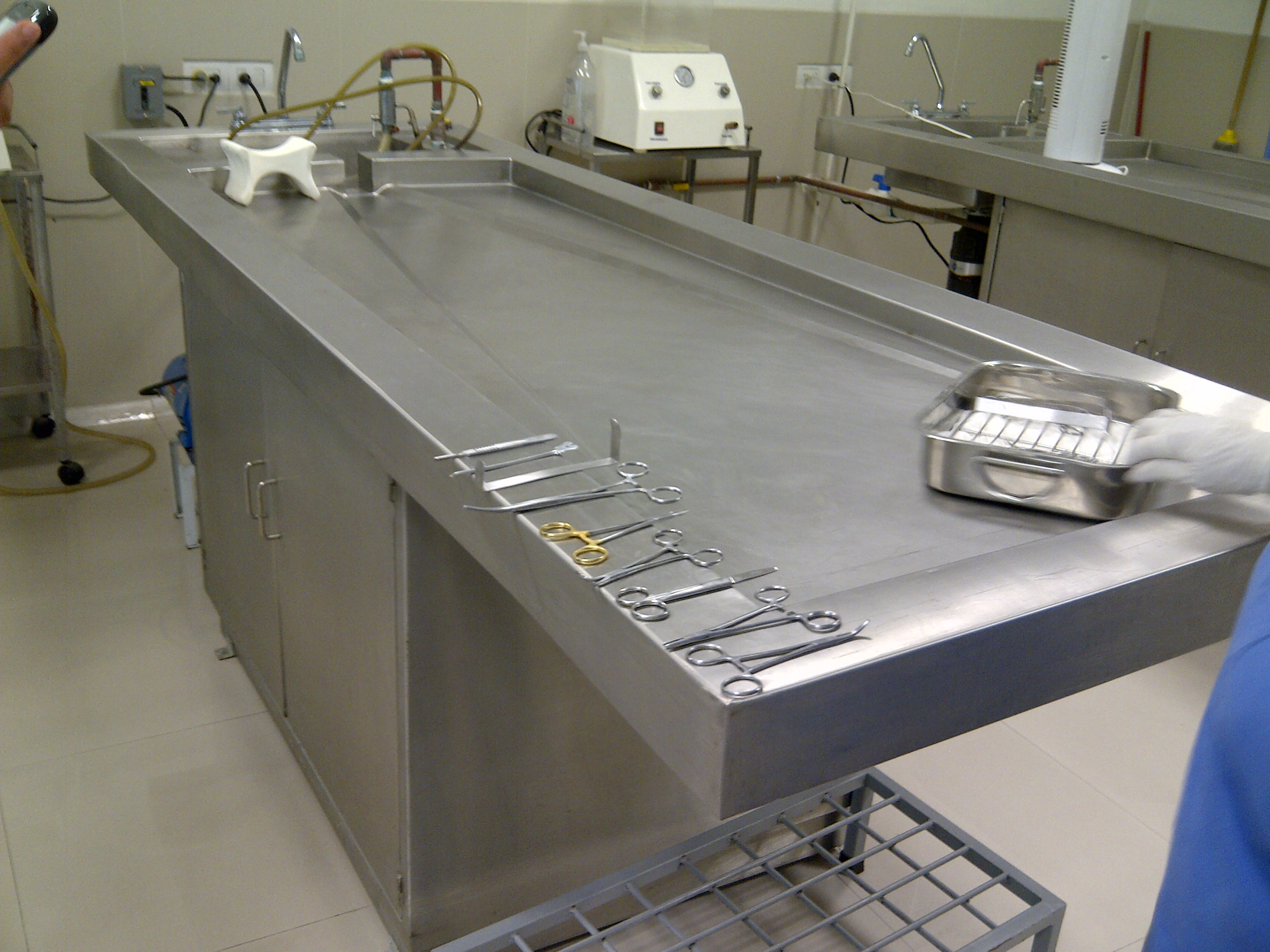
Embalming table and instruments

Doughty's main inspiration for her advocacy work was the frequent absence of the decedents' families in the process, which she attributed to the Western death anxiety and death phobia. She wanted to encourage death acceptance, and a return to such practices as memento mori, reminders of one's own mortality, resulting in healthier grieving, mourning, and closure after the inevitable deaths of people around us, as well as starting a movement to broaden the funeral industry to offer more funeral options, such as natural burial, sky burial, and alkaline hydrolysis (liquid cremation). Embalming began to dominate in the US after the Civil War. A century later, in the 1960s, Americans began to turn away from embalming and burial, as cremation became increasingly popular, so that today it is used in almost half of deaths in urban areas. Cremation is seen as a threat to the traditional funeral industry, but has a reputation as the more environmentally friendly option. This change can be traced to the lifting of the ban on cremation by Pope Paul VI in 1963, and to the publication in the same year of The American Way of Death by Jessica Mitford, documenting abuses in the funeral industry and criticizing the excessive cost of funerals. Mitford's book, and the movement it started, was one of Doughty's inspirations, but Doughty feels that while Mitford had the right target, the profit-driven funeral industry, Mitford erred in sharing the industry's, and the public's, unhealthy desire to push out of sight and avoid thinking about the corpse itself. Doughty seeks to build on Mitford's reforms but in a direction that embraces the reality of death and returns to funeral and mourning practices that include spending time with and having contact with the dead body itself.

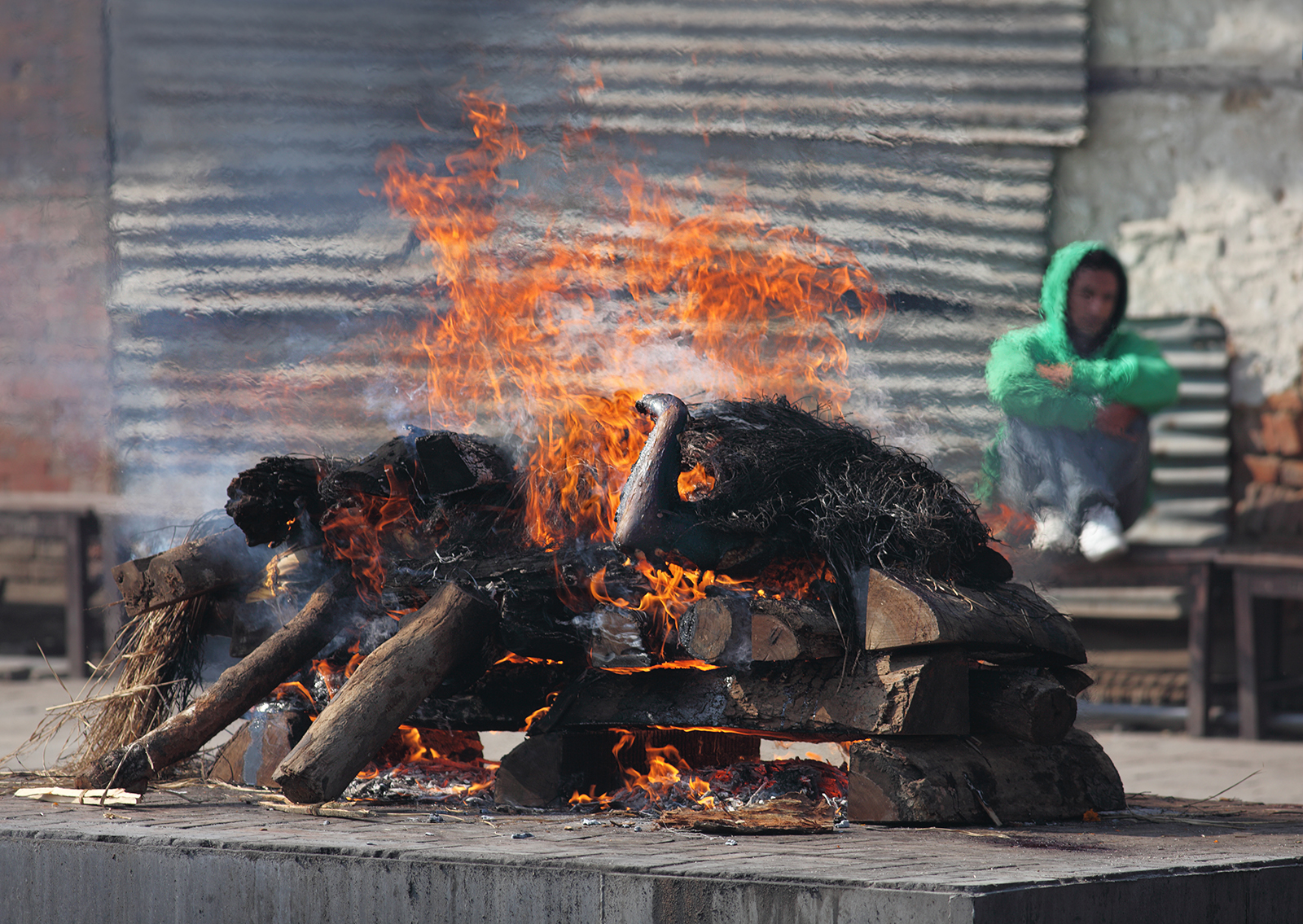
Funeral pyre in Nepal

Doughty advocates reappropriating pejoratives like 'morbid', and wants to reverse the attitude that "talking about death is deviant". She says, "Death is not deviant, it's actually the most normal and universal act there is." She is working to overcome the belief that dead bodies are dangerous and can only be handled by trained professionals using technical equipment and specialized facilities. She says the most important thing she wants the public to know is that the corpse is the family's legal quasi-property, and that, "you have the power over what happens to that body. Don't let anyone, funeral home, hospital, coroner, etc., pressure you into making a quick decision you might regret. Take the time to do your research and understand your options. The dead person will still be dead in 24 hours; you have time to make the right decision for you."

While a body is not commercial property, which can be transferred or held for a debt, for purposes of burial the body is treated as the next of kin's property. The highest priority changes that Doughty would like to see in US law are the repeal of the laws in eight states that require a funeral home for at least some part of the process, and making alkaline hydrolysis available in more than the current eight states.

One funeral industry professional of 40 years experience lauded the goal of greater family involvement in funerals, but said it was "virtually impossible" for many families today to return to preparing bodies themselves or hosting wakes in their own homes, citing the challenges of moving a body themselves, or dealing with a body that had been autopsied, or, especially, the innate fear of contact with the dead, which he did not think would "ever change". Doughty says her "dream funeral is one where the family is involved, washing and dressing the body and keeping it at home. When they've taken the time they need with the dead person, transporting the person to a natural burial cemetery and putting them straight into the ground, no heavy sealed casket or vault. Just food for worms."

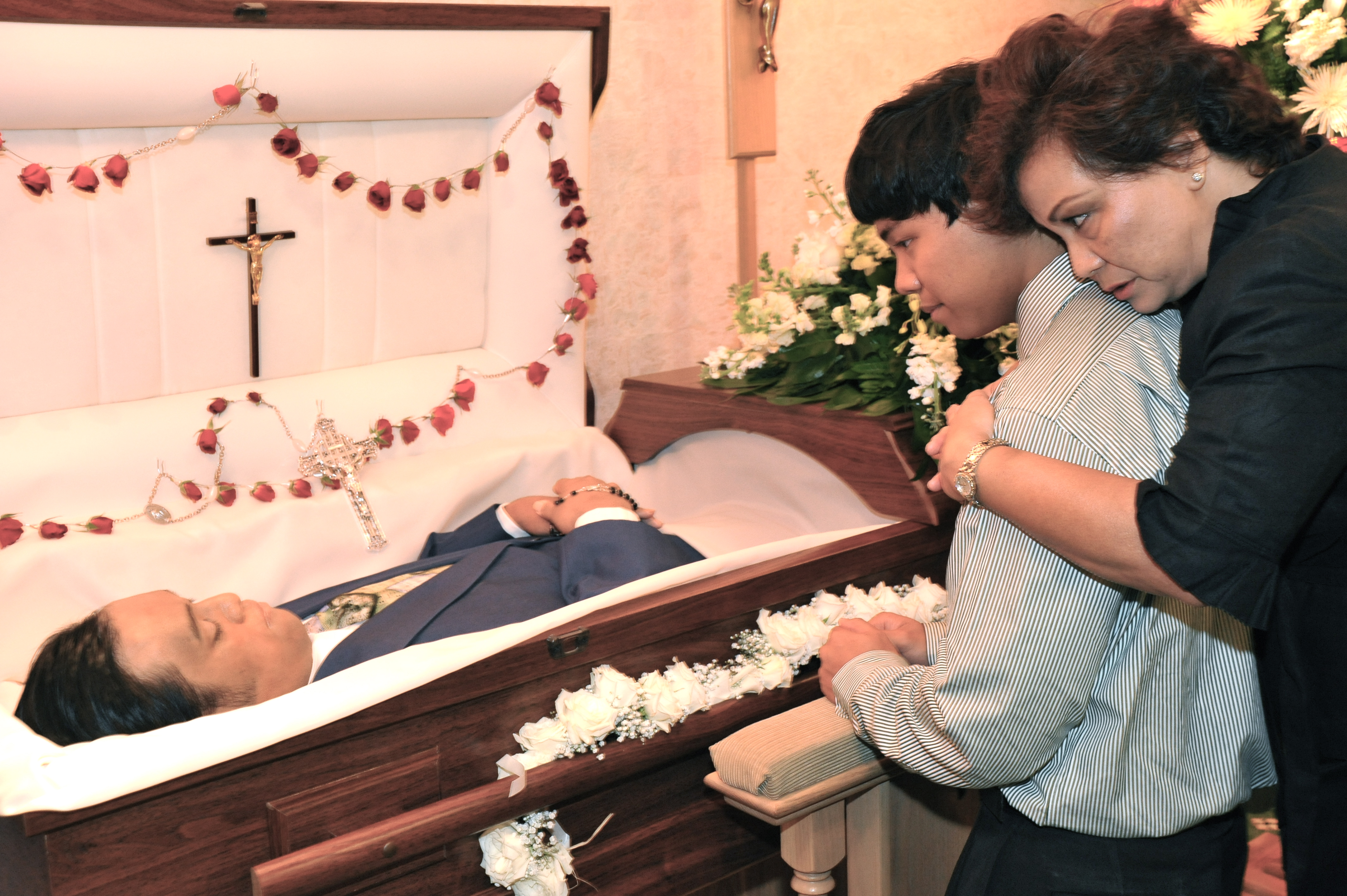
Mourners viewing a body in Florida

NPR interviewer Terry Gross said to Doughty that if she spent time at home with a loved one's body in a natural state, she feared she would be left with her last memory of them as a corpse, growing cold and showing subtle changes that indicate the permanence of the end of life, the very things Doughty said are the goal of closer involvement in the death process. Doughty said she has never heard regrets from anyone who has done it; rather, they said it was a positive experience where they felt empowered and that they were "giving something back to this person that you loved." Conversely, Doughty has heard from many who only briefly saw the body in a hospital, and later in an artificial, embalmed state, and they regret not having more time to grieve close to the corpse.

Gross asked Doughty if people seeking out and witnessing death in beheading videos is comparable to the comfortability with death that she advocates, and Doughty said they were in no way similar, one is "a form of psychological terror" and the other is "a dead body in its natural state." But, Doughty said, terrorists know how strong the modern fear and denial of death is, and they are exploiting that to heighten the force of the terror they cause.

== Ask a Mortician ==
Doughty's YouTube series Ask a Mortician began in 2011, humorously explores morbid and sometimes taboo death topics such as decomposition and necrophilia. By 2012, after 12 episodes, Ask a Mortician had 434,000 views, and by January 2022 the channel had 258 clips with a total of 215,000,000 views. Doughty uses an irreverent, offbeat and surreal tone to attract the largest possible audience for a subject that is otherwise off-putting and depressing to many potential viewers. Doughty said, "I take my job and this whole movement incredibly seriously. I do [the videos] with a sense of humor, but it's my life, and it's really important to me that a positive death message gets across."

Fans of Ask a Mortician have told Doughty they were shamed for wanting to view the corpse of someone they lost, which Doughty says is the result of the death industry "whitewashing death". Doughty instead advocates spending time with the body, not just hours, but around two days, to fully accept the death. She also encourages rituals and personal participation in the preparation of the corpse, including washing or dressing it.

Originally focused on answering questions from viewers, the Ask a Mortician series has largely shifted focus to a series of short form documentaries where Doughty speaks about notable historical events involving death. These have varied from a series on funeral home malfeasance called “Cadaver Crimes” to stories about famous shipwrecks such as the disaster of the SS Eastland.

== Writing ==
=== Smoke Gets in Your Eyes ===
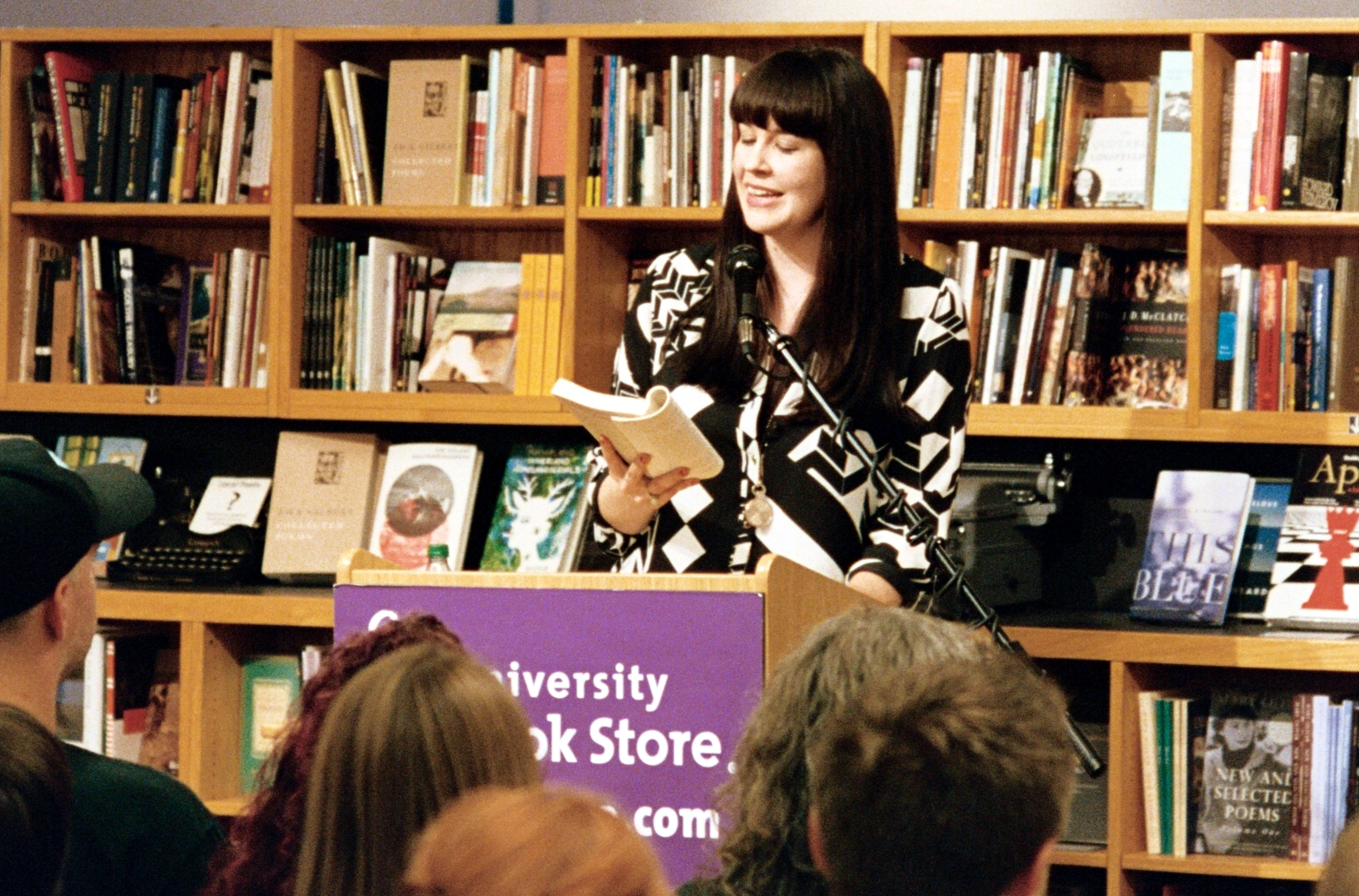
Reading in Seattle in 2014

In September 2014, Doughty's first book, Smoke Gets in Your Eyes & Other Lessons from the Crematory was published by W. W. Norton & Company. It is a memoir of her experiences that serves as a manifesto of her goals. The book is named for the 20th-century pop song "Smoke Gets in Your Eyes", in reference to both the literal smoke of cremation and the associated emotions. W. W. Norton's Tom Mayer outbid seven other publishers for the worldwide rights to Smoke Gets in Your Eyes in 2012. The book debuted at No. 14 on The New York Times and at No. 10 on the Los Angeles Times bestseller lists of hardcover nonfiction for the week ending October 5, 2014.

Doughty's intention with the book was to combine "memoir, science, and manifesto" in an entertaining way that would attract a wide readership to the unpleasant topics of death, decay, and corpse handling, to challenge the reader to confront their own mortality. Doughty says readers have told her that they themselves are fascinated by the graphic descriptions of such things as "stomach-content removal" or the "bubblating" of human fat during a cremation, yet they are "not sure other people will be able to handle it." Doughty said, "I think we need to admit that, as a group, as humans, we are all drawn to the gory details. When reality is hidden from us, we crave it."

The Washington Post noted that while Doughty's "endearingly anxious inner workings take up a large part" of the book, there are also portraits of her three eccentric coworkers at Pacific Interment, who each teach lessons she carries after leaving to attend mortuary school. "What holds Smoke Gets in Your Eyes together," the Post said, is Doughty's overarching goal to increase the reader's awareness of their own mortality and face their fear of death, and the book's effective use of humor keeps it from being too sorrowful or gruesome, in spite of its graphic descriptions. The Boston Globe's review of Smoke Gets in Your Eyes said that, "If at times Doughty's voice is a bit too breezy ... her observations are solid." The Fredericksburg, Virginia Free Lance-Star said the book was engrossing and "fulfills all its pre-pub hype, jacket blurbs and positive advance reviews". Natalie Kusz wrote in The New York Times Book Review that, "the book is more consequential than its spin potential, [...] more cultural critique than exposé," using Doughty's personal narrative to lead the public to a new relationship with death.

Since writing the book, Doughty began working to launch Undertaking LA, a funeral service alternative to the mainstream funeral options. It started as a seminar series meant to educate the public on their death options under California law. As of 2014, the service consisted of "two licensed morticians telling the public, 'you don't need us!'", instead advocating DIY funerals.

=== From Here to Eternity ===
Doughty's second book, From Here to Eternity: Traveling the World to Find the Good Death, illustrated by Landis Blair, was published in October 2017. It chronicles Doughty's travels to see first-hand death customs in Mexico, Indonesia, Japan, Spain, and Bolivia, as well as at home in the US, at an open air funeral pyre and a body farm. In the book's introduction, Doughty said Americans too often spend more than they need to on funerals for things they do not really want or need, and have a less healthy grieving process because of a culture of avoiding conversations about death, avoiding the subject as taboo. She said the establishment funeral industry benefits from public's ignorance of the options and rights they have in how to handle the death, having no incentive to correct the perception that handing the body over to a funeral home for a traditional funeral is the best or only option. The book's goal is to change that culture by, "witnessing firsthand how death is handled in other cultures" in the hope that she can "demonstrate that there is no one prescribed way to 'do' or understand death." The book reached No. 7 on the Los Angeles Times Bestseller list and No. 9 on The New York Times list.

=== Will My Cat Eat My Eyeballs? ===
Doughty's third book, Will My Cat Eat My Eyeballs?: Big Questions from Tiny Mortals About Death, answers 35 questions sourced from children. The book originated from Doughty's observation that most adults she encountered had not received adequate death education.

An excerpt, read by Doughty, will appear on the new Lit Hub/Podglomerate Storybound podcast, accompanied by an original score from singer-songwriter Stephanie Strange.

=== Dead in the Water: The Lost Passengers of the Titanic ===
Doughty's fourth book, Dead in the Water: The Lost Passengers of the Titanic, was announced in July 2026, and was slated to release April 6, 2027 in the United States and 15 April 2027 in the United Kingdom. It will explore victim stories and the process of body retrieval of the sinking of the Titanic. It will also explore how people respond or refuse to respond to death when it occurs in extreme conditions.

== The Order of the Good Death ==
Doughty is the founder of "The Order of the Good Death", an inclusive community of funeral industry professionals, academics, as well as artists who advocate for and make possible, a more death informed society. "The Order of the Good Death" is presented to the public as a website that shares articles and information by prominent figures in the death industry that make individuals more informed about the inevitable conclusion of one's life. In previous years the public had an engagement with the cemetery as a community place, which people do not have anymore. The Order of the Good Death is Doughty's way of creating a community while teaching individuals to accept death. Doughty's work has a strong focus on ways of "making death a part of one's life". "If Doughty and the Order's death-care revolution is successful, Americans will be more comfortable contemplating mortality and dying— thus preparing for it, seriously considering alternatives such as green burial, composting, and using crematoria that have carbon-offset policies".

== Published works ==
=== Books ===
- Smoke Gets in Your Eyes: And Other Lessons from the Crematory (2014)
- From Here to Eternity: Traveling the World to Find the Good Death (2017)
- Will My Cat Eat My Eyeballs? Big Questions About Death (2019)

==== Upcoming ====
- Dead in the Water: The Lost Passengers of the Titanic (2027)

=== Articles ===
- "The battle over Tamerlan's body; As a mortician, I see how people care most about corpses when they want revenge on them". Salon.com. May 10, 2013. Archived from the original on May 11, 2013.
- "We must consider Gaza images: It's OK to wonder about the lives of the dead — it makes us human, and it makes us understand; Don't let the photos make you afraid of dying. Let them make you afraid of how we're living". Salon.com. August 3, 2014. Archived from the original on August 4, 2014.
- "The Practical Nobility of Donating One's Body to Science; A crematory employee explores the many ways one's remains can go. [excerpt from Smoke Gets in Your Eyes]". The Atlantic. September 15, 2014.
- "That Time My Job Involved Tossing Dead Babies Into a Crematory [excerpt from Smoke Gets in Your Eyes]". Jezebel. September 19, 2014.
- "Secrets of the crematory: "Hey, come in here and help me get this big guy on the table" [excerpt from Smoke Gets in Your Eyes]". Salon.com. September 27, 2014. Archived from the original on August 3, 2025.

=== Film and video ===
- The Animals at IMDb (2011 short film, dir. Angeline Gragasin)
- The Ecstasy of Decay at IMDb (2011 2-part documentary series, dir. Angeline Gragasin)

== Appearances ==
- TED Talk: A burial practice that nourishes the planet on YouTube. April 3, 2017

=== Podcasts ===
Year	Podcast	Host	Episode	Notes
2012	Skepticality	Derek Colanduno	"A Good Death"	
2012	Savage Love	Dan Savage	"Face-eating zombies, infested snacks, and buckets and buckets of blood!"	
2013	Savage Love	Dan Savage	"Dan and the mortician talk about DEATH"	
2014	Savage Love	Dan Savage	"The LIVE Valentine's Day Show!"	
2014	Skepticality	Derek Colanduno	"Death Business"	
2022	Hi Jinkx! with Jinkx Monsoon	Jinkx Monsoon	"Caitlin Doughty"	

=== Television ===
Year	Title	Role	Notes
2020	The Midnight Gospel	Death	Episode 7, "Turtles of the Eclipse"
