= Promession =

Method of corpse disposal

Promession is a disposal technique for human remains involving freeze drying. It was first proposed in Sweden as an alternative to cremation. It was marketed as being more environmentally friendly than other methods of disposal, as it avoided the potential pollution of groundwater, which can occur with the use of traditional burial. It was also marketed as a way of saving space. However, it has never been carried out on a human being, and is not currently commercially available.

Promession has been suggested as a means to deal with the corpse from a human death in space.

== Origin ==
The concept of promession was developed by Swedish biologist Susanne Wiigh-Mäsak, deriving its name from the Italian word for "promise", promessa. She founded Promessa Organic AB in 1997 to commercially pursue her idea; however, the company suffered bankruptcy in 2015.

== Process ==
The idea of promession involves five steps:

1. Coffin separation: the body is placed into the chamber.
2. Cryogenic freezing: liquid nitrogen at −196 °C crystallizes the body.
3. Vibration: the body is disintegrated into particles.
4. Freeze drying: particles are freeze dried in a drying chamber, leaving approximately 30% of the original weight.
5. Metal separation: any metals (e.g., tooth amalgam, artificial hips, etc.) are removed, either by magnetism or by sieving. The dry powder is placed in a biodegradable casket which is interred in the top layers of soil, where aerobic bacteria decompose the remains into humus in as little as 6–12 months.

== See also ==
- Aquamation
- Natural burial
