= Natural burial =

Method of burial

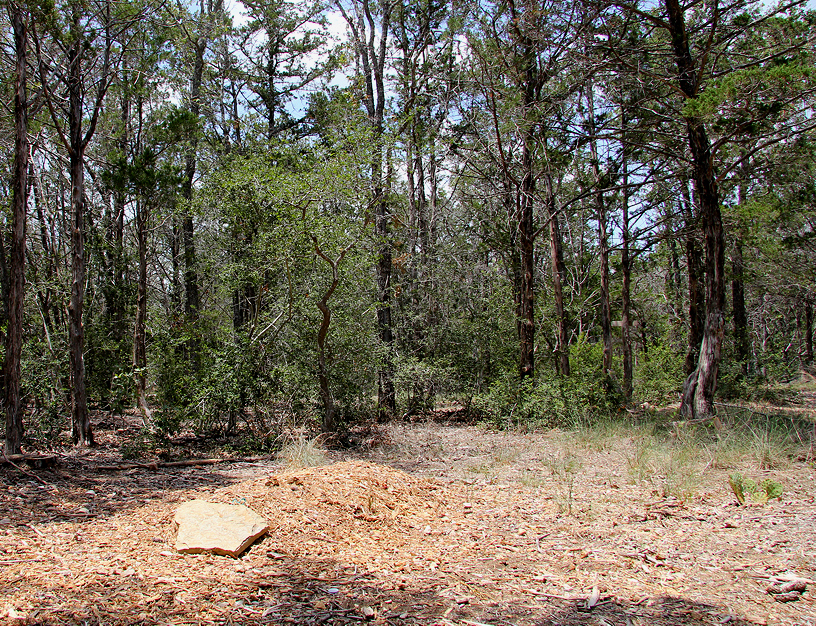
A natural burial grave site. It is sometimes advocated that the landscape be modified as little as possible, and in this case, only a flat stone marker was used.

Natural burial is the interment of the body of a dead person in the soil or a body of water in a manner that does not inhibit decomposition but allows the body to be naturally recycled. It is an alternative to burial methods and funerary customs.

The body may be prepared without chemical preservatives or disinfectants, such as embalming fluid, which are designed to inhibit the microbial decomposers that break the body down. It may be buried in a biodegradable coffin, casket, or shroud. The grave does not use a burial vault or outer burial container that would prevent the body's contact with soil. The grave should be shallow enough to allow microbial activity similar to that found in composting.

Natural burial grounds have been used throughout human history and are used in many countries.

== History ==
Although natural burials present themselves as a relatively modern concept in Western societies, they have been practiced for many years in different cultures out of "religious obligation, necessity, or tradition". For example, many Muslims perform natural burial out of a duty to their religion. Others, like those in African countries, bury naturally because they cannot afford the cost of embalming. In China, the Cultural Revolution saw the popularity of burial rise over cremation. Truly natural burials also include the burial of bodies within tree roots in the Amazon rainforest in Peru, and burying the deceased in the Tanzanian bush. According to Nature, the earliest known human burial dates back to the Middle Stone Age (about 74,000 to 82,000 years ago) of a toddler in what is now Kenya.

Natural burial has been practiced for thousands of years, but has been interrupted in modern times by new methods such as vaults, liners, embalming, and mausoleums that mitigate the decomposition process. In the late 19th century Sir Francis Seymour Hayden proposed "earth to earth burial" in a pamphlet of the same name, as an alternative to both cremation and the slow putrefaction of encased corpses.

== Types ==
The Green Burial Council (GBC) identifies three types of natural burial cemeteries:

1. Hybrid burial grounds
2. Natural burial grounds
3. Conservation burial grounds

All types of natural burials – hybrid, natural, and conservation – must meet standards of "burial practice" and "customer relation" according to the GBC. More specifically, a hybrid burial ground can be certified when it forbids embalming, prohibits toxic or non-degradable chemicals in the burial process, and mandates natural burial advertising. The second type, natural burial grounds, must fulfill the requirements of hybrid burial grounds as well as require "site planning" and a survey of the land that stakes out important areas for preservation. Natural burial grounds also need a deed restriction. As for conservation burial grounds, restoration of at least two to four hectares of land and an official draft of a conservation easement are additional requirements.

== Memorialization ==
Natural burial grounds employ a variety of methods of memorialization. Families that bury their loved ones in nature preserves can record the GPS coordinates of the location where they are buried, without using physical markers. Some natural burial sites use flat wooden plaques, or a name written on a natural rock. Many families plant trees, or other native plants near the grave to provide a living memorial.

== Environmental considerations ==
While natural burials tend to prevent the environmental damage done by conventional techniques, some practitioners go further by using burial fees to acquire land to restore native habitat and save endangered species. Such land management techniques are called "conservation burials". In addition to restoration ecology, and habitat conservation projects, others have proposed alternative natural uses of the land such as sustainable agriculture and permaculture, to maintain the burial area in perpetuity. Landscaping methods may accelerate or slow down the decomposition rate of bodies. Natural burials sometimes do not use any machinery or heavy equipment for digging the grave site. Instead, the grave sites may be dug by hand.

=== Environmental issues with conventional burials ===
Each year, 22,500 cemeteries across the United States bury approximately:

- 70,000 m^{3} of hardwood caskets
- 82,000 kg of steel caskets
- 12,700 kg of steel vaults
- 2,500 kg of copper and bronze caskets
- 1,484,000 kg of reinforced concrete vaults
- 3,200 m^{3} of embalming fluid, which usually includes formaldehyde.

When formaldehyde is used for embalming, it breaks down, and the chemicals released into the ground after burial and ensuing decomposition are inert. The problems with the use of formaldehyde and its constituent components in natural burial are the exposure of mortuary workers to it and the killing of the decomposer microbes necessary for breakdown of the body in the soil. Natural burial promotes the restoration of poor soil areas and allows for long-term reuse of the land.

Coffins (tapered-shoulder shape) and caskets (rectangular) are made from a variety of materials, most of them not biodegradable; 80–85% of the caskets sold for burial in North America in 2006 were made of stamped steel. Solid wood and particle board (chipboard) coffins with hardwood veneers account for 10–15% of sales, and fibreglass and alternative materials, such as woven fiber, make up the rest. In Australia, 85–90% of coffins are solid wood and particle board. Most traditional caskets in the UK are made from chipboard covered in a thin veneer. Handles are usually plastic designed to look like brass. Chipboard requires glue to stick the wood particles together. Some glues that are used, such as those that contain formaldehyde, are feared to cause pollution when they are burned during cremation or when degrading in the ground. However, not all engineered wood products are produced using formaldehyde glues. Caskets and coffins are often manufactured using exotic and even endangered species of wood, and are designed to prevent decomposition. While there are generally no restrictions on the type of coffin used, most sites encourage the use of environmentally friendly coffins made from materials like cane, bamboo, wicker or fiberboard. A weight bearing shroud is another option.

== Religious law ==
Jewish law forbids embalming for traditional burials, which it considers to be desecration of the body. The body is ritually washed by select members of the Jewish community, wrapped in either a linen or muslin sheet, and placed in an all-wood casket. The casket must not have any metal in it, and it often has holes in the bottom to ensure that it and the cadaver rapidly decompose and return to the earth. Burial vaults are not used unless required by the cemetery. In Israel, Jews are buried without a casket, in just the shroud.

Islamic law instructs that the deceased be washed and buried with only a wrapping of white cloth made of natural fibers. The cloth is used to preserve the dead person's dignity and to emphasize simplicity. The cloth is sometimes perfumed, but in a natural burial, no chemical preservatives or embalming fluid are used, nor is there a burial vault, coffin or casket. Islamic law does not require any of these.

== Applications ==
Due to their potential for being repurposed for public use, natural burial sites can offer many valuable services that modern methods of burial (i.e. cemeteries) do not, such as "recreation, human health and restoration, stormwater management, microclimate regulation, [and] aesthetics". Issues like the scarcity and high expense of real estate could possibly be mitigated by reinventing existing spaces like cemeteries, instead of developing on new land. For example, instead of replacing modern cemeteries with commercial or residential development, they can continue to function as green space for public parks. However, this concept of repurposing graveyards into not only more eco-friendly burial sites but areas of recreation causes controversy between those whose sole intent is to grieve and those who believe the land could be used more productively.

== Alternative methods of burial ==
Alternatives to ground burials include burial in a coral reef, sky burial, burial at sea, hybrid cemeteries and human composting.

=== Reef burials ===
Cremated remains are sometimes placed inside concrete coral reef balls, and ceremoniously placed in the sea as part of a reef ecosystem. These balls are used to repair damage to coral reefs, and to provide new habitat for fish and other sea life.

=== Sky burial ===
In some parts of Tibet and Mongolia, a person's remains are fed to vultures in a burial known as sky burial. This is seen as being good to the environment as well as good karma in Buddhism.

=== Burial at sea ===
Burial at sea or in another large body of natural water is seen as a natural burial if done in a way that benefits the environment and without formaldehyde. Some organizations specialize in natural burial at sea (in a shroud), allowing the body to decompose or be consumed by animals. The EPA has issued a general permit under the Marine Protection, Research, and Sanctuaries Act (MPRSA) that authorizes the burial of non-cremated human remains at sea. Human remains can be buried at sea as an alternate form of a natural burial under certain guidelines as per The United States Coast Guard, The United States Navy, or any civil authority charged with the responsibility for making such arrangements.

=== Hybrid ===
A hybrid cemetery is a conventional cemetery that offers the essential aspects of natural burial, either throughout the cemetery or in a designated section. Hybrid cemeteries can earn a certification that does not require them to use vaults. This allows for the use of any eco-friendly, biodegradable burial container such as a shroud or a soft wood casket.

=== Tree pod burial ===
An increasing number of companies, such as Capsula Mundi, The Living Urn, and Coeio, are offering tree pod burials where the corpse is first stored in an egg-shaped pod made of biodegradable and compostable materials. The pod is then deposited into the ground, where a tree is planted above it. Over the years, the body and pod decompose and enrich the soil with nutrients for the tree to intake and grow. Some architectural prototypes employing tree pod burials envision a forest park of the deceased, where mourning loved ones could take a stroll and honor the dead, as opposed to a more artificially constructed graveyard.

While less environmentally friendly, an alternative design of the pod offers to contain ashes instead of the body.

=== Burial tree ===
Interring bodies above ground level by means of a tree or scaffolding was once a common practice among Naga people, the Balinese, and certain tribes of indigenous peoples in Australia and the Americas. The bodies were left in these structures, exposed to the elements, until the flesh decomposed and only bones remained. Often the bones would be retrieved by family for burial or other funerary practices.

=== Tower of Silence ===
The Tower of Silence is a raised circular structure used in Zoroastrian funerary rituals that exposes the corpse to the elements for decomposition to avoid contaminating soil and water with decomposing bodies. After scavenger animals consume the flesh, skeletal remains are retrieved and put into a central pit where they are allowed to break down the rest of the way.

=== River burial ===
Scattering the ashes of a deceased individual into a body of water is practiced in many cultures around the world and plays a part in several religions, including Hinduism. Cremation is the traditional manner of Hindu final deposition which takes place during Antyesti rites. However, some circumstances do not allow for cremation so instead "Jal Pravah" is practiced – the release of the body into a river. The Ganges is the most sacred river in Hinduism and is central to the religion's funerary traditions therefore it is the preferred river for funeral rites. The riverside city of Varanasi is the center of this practice where massive religious sites along the Ganges, like Manikarnika Ghat, are dedicated to this purpose. Situations that call for Jal Pravah are unwed girls, death from infectious disease, death from snakebite, children under 5 years of age, holy men, pregnant women, and people who have committed suicide. Nor are the very poor cremated due to the cost of wood. If a family cannot afford enough wood to incinerate the entire body, the remaining body parts that were not consumed by fire are set adrift in the Ganges. Rather than being an ecologically friendly practice like other natural burial methods, Jal Pravah is a notable component of pollution in the Ganges in the Varanasi region because of the high number of bodies involved.

The government of Uttar Pradesh has banned the practice after hundreds of decomposing bodies were found polluting Ganges during the COVID-19 epidemy.

== Locations ==
=== United Kingdom ===
The Association of Natural Burial Grounds (ANBG) was established by The Natural Death Centre charity in 1994. It aims to help people to establish sites, to provide guidance to natural burial ground operators, to represent its members, and to provide a Code of Conduct for members. The NDC also publishes The Natural Death Handbook.

The first woodland burial ground in the UK was created in 1993 at Carlisle Cemetery and is called The Woodland Burial. Nearly 300 dedicated natural burial grounds have been created in the UK.

There is no legal requirements for using a coffin in the UK and a body can be buried in a cloth if desired.

=== Canada ===
Each province and territory within Canada has its own resources and regulations for handling the disposal of a body. In British Columbia, green burials are treated the same way as traditional burials, as embalming is not legally required for interment. All burials are required to follow the regulations set forth by their respective provincial government.

With growing interest in promoting eco-friendly practices, natural burials have been discussed in various Canadian news outlets. Some debate still exists around what makes certain funeral practices eco-friendly and how cemeteries justify these claims as no government-imposed standard or definition currently exist.

Eco-friendly funeral practices in Canada can include:

- Burial at sea
- Tree planting
- Green/natural burials

Canada offers a wide range of environmentally friendly services and alternatives to conventional funerary customs and corpse disposal practices in Canada. The Green Burial Council is an environmental certification organization for green burials practised in North America (Canada and the US). Environmental certificates are offered to cemeteries, funeral homes, and product manufacturers involved in the funeral industry. These certificates would allow consumers to distinguish between the three different levels of green burial grounds and their appropriate standards. The Green Burial Council also offers information on the types of coffins, urns, and embalming tools that would fall under the eco-friendly category and be available for North American consumers.

The Green Burial Society of Canada was founded in 2013 with the goal to ensure standards of certification are set for green burial practices. The society emphasizes five principles of green burial: no embalming, direct earth burial, ecological restoration and conservation, communal memorialization, and the optimization of land use.

The Natural Burial Association is a volunteer, non-profit organization independent of the funeral industry. The organization's mandate is to facilitate the creation of natural burial grounds in Ontario, which provide an environmentally-friendly option at death.

==== Salt Spring Island Natural Cemetery ====
Located in Burgoyne Valley on Salt Spring Island, British Columbia, Salt Spring Island Natural Cemetery is Canada's first modern stand-alone natural burial ground that is open to the public. The cemetery is in a forested area between the ocean and the hills, where the Coastal Douglas Fir ecosystem is restored and protected, and graves are marked with memorial stones gathered from the land.

==== Royal Oak Burial Park ====
Located in Victoria, British Columbia, the Royal Oak Burial Park opened the Woodlands grave site for green burial space in the cemetery since October 2008, dedicating its space to burials that allow for the natural decomposition of human remains which in turn provides nutrients for the surrounding ecosystem. The area has native Coastal Douglas Fir along with a variety of ecologically similar tree species, which the cemetery claims to keep as close to the natural ecosystem as possible. To be interred in Royal Oak Burial Park, embalming of the body is prohibited. The body must be kept in its natural state, which is then placed in some form of biodegradable container or shroud. Traditional grave markers are not used, but rather families are given options to engrave natural boulders or plants.

==== Union Cemetery ====
Found in Cobourg, Ontario, the Cobourg Union Cemetery is located on 20 acres of land, currently containing 3,800 burial lots. The cemetery is made up of both traditional burials with headstones and regular interment practices, as well as a green space dedicated to eco-friendly burials. Consumers are given information about biodegradable coffins and procedures for a green burial. Families are not allowed to place permanent markers on the grave sites other than native species of plants such as flowers and bushes.

==== Meadowvale Cemetery ====
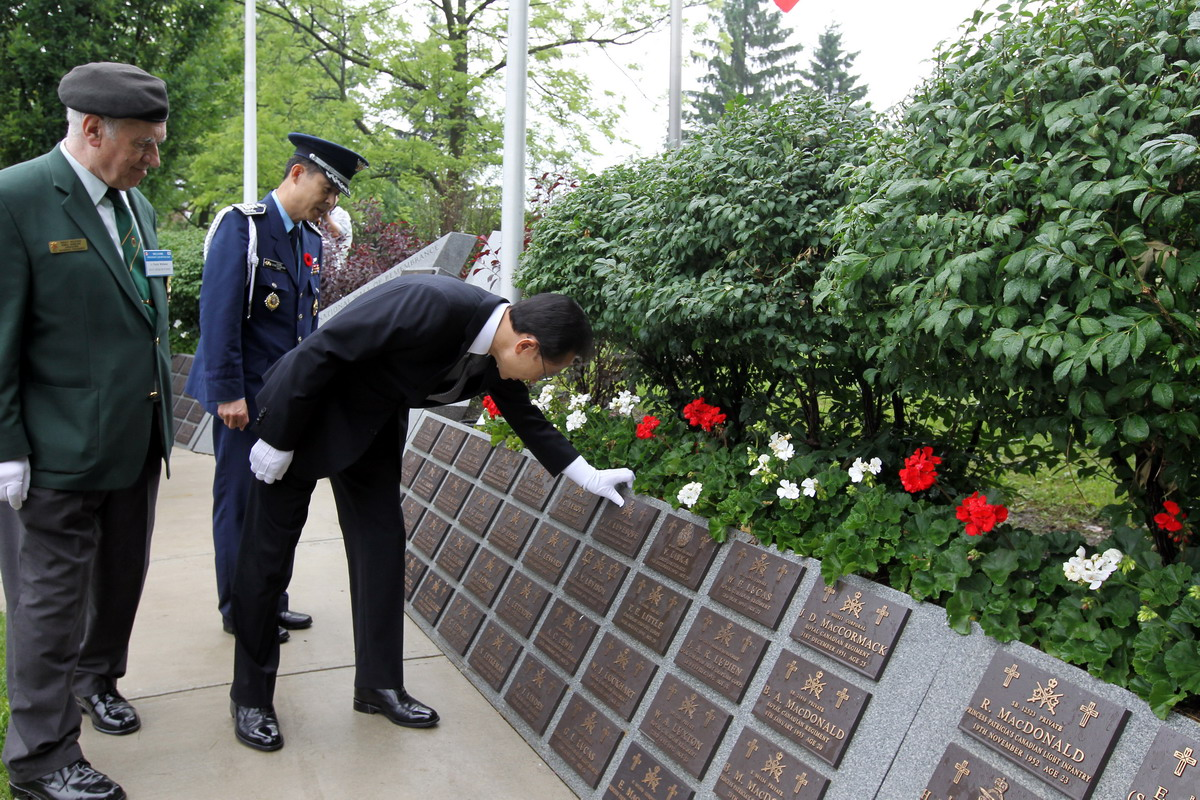
South Korean President Lee Myung-bak visiting the Meadowvale Cemetery in Brampton, Ontario, in 2013

The Meadowvale Cemetery originally opened in 1981 in Brampton, Ontario, with the green burial section of the cemetery opening in 2012. The cemetery allows for both burial and cremation as long as embalming is done without formaldehyde or other harsh chemicals. They also ensure that remains are placed into a non-toxic, biodegradable container. Graves are not allowed to be marked with traditional headstones, but they offer a granite stone at the site's entrance for name engraving.

==== Duffin Meadows Cemetery ====
Duffin Meadows Cemetery is located in Pickering, Ontario, and is attached to the original traditional cemetery. The cemetery offers natural burials for individuals who have been embalmed to eco-friendly standards, then interred using biodegradable shrouds and coffins. Grave sites will be left to grow over naturally, meaning grass will not be mowed and the placement of artificial flowers and other markers will not be allowed.

=== Australia ===
There are a number of different natural burial parks across Australia, each of them slightly different in what they offer. One of the more advanced parks is Lake Macquarie Memorial Park, on the Central Coast of New South Wales, which contains a Natural Memorial reserve dedicated to natural burials.

=== New Zealand ===
New Zealand's Natural Burial organisation was started in 1999 by Mark Blackham. It is a not-for-profit organization that advocates for natural cemeteries, promotes the concept to the public, and certifies cemeteries, funeral directors and caskets for use in participating cemeteries.

Natural burial ground at Mākara Cemetery in Wellington

The first natural cemetery in New Zealand was established in 2008 in the capital, Wellington, as a partnership between the Wellington City Council and Natural Burials. It is the nation's biggest natural cemetery, covering approx 2 hectares within Mākara Cemetery, and home to 120 burials (April 2015). More natural cemeteries have since been set up by between Natural Burials and the council authorities in New Plymouth in 2011, Otaki in 2012. and Marlborough in 2014. As of 2024 there were 20 natural burial sites across the country, and as of 2026 that number has risen to 22.

Other councils have set up small natural burial zones: Marsden Valley in 2011, Motueka in 2012, and Hamilton in 2014. Although these have all been based on the approach used by Natural Burials, they have not been certified by the organisation.

==== Māori funeral traditions ====
Long before natural burials became a marketable service, Māori honored the dead in environmentally responsible ways. In the Māori language natural burials are called urupā tautaiao. Traditional burial practices included standing burials – with the corpse oriented upright in a standing position – and suspending bodies in trees as they decompose, before collecting the bones and interring them in a wāhi tapu site. These practices had died out by around 1900.

Much of Maori culture is defined by a respect and duty to Papatūānuku, or mother nature. As such, bodies went untreated with artificial chemicals or preservatives, which sped up the natural process of decomposition. As a result of European colonization, the process of tangihanga (customary funeral) has integrated with European burial practices, such as the use of coffins and chemical embalming. The natural burial movement more closely aligns with traditional Māori customary funeral ritual, and may help to decolonize the process of burial for Māori.

=== United States ===
The Green Burial Council (GBC) is an independent, tax-exempt, nonprofit organization that aims to encourage sustainability in the interment industry and to use burial as a means of ecological restoration and landscape conservation. Founded in 2005, the GBC has been stewarded by individuals representing the environmental/conservation community, consumer organizations, academia, the deathcare industry, and such organizations and institutions as The Nature Conservancy, The Trust for Public Land, AARP, and the University of Colorado. The organization established the nation's first certifiable standards for cemeteries, funeral providers, burial product manufacturers, and cremation facilities. As of 2013, there are a total of 37 burial grounds certified by the GBC in 23 states and British Columbia. A cemetery becomes certified by demonstrating compliance with stringent established standards for a given category. Conventional funeral providers in 39 states now offer the burial package approved by the GBC.

California
Most of the 32-acre (130,000 m^{2}) Fernwood Burial Ground, adjacent to the Golden Gate National Recreation Area in Mill Valley, California, is set aside for natural burial, with no tombstones or caskets.

Purissima Cemetery is a natural burial cemetery located south of Half Moon Bay, California.

Florida
Prairie Creek Conservation Cemetery in Gainesville, Florida, was the state's first conservation burial ground. The 93-acre preserve is protected in partnership with local nonprofit conservation organization, Alachua Conservation Trust. The space is actively managed and being restored to diverse prairie and hardwood forest.

Maine
Cedar Brook Burial Ground in Limington, Maine, the first green cemetery in Maine, is located on a 150-acre tree farm thirty miles due west of Portland. Within its borders sits the rock wall-enclosed Joshua Small Cemetery, a tiny, historic graveyard whose dozen burials date back to the early 1800s.

New Jersey
Steelmantown Cemetery is the only cemetery in the State of New Jersey certified and approved by the Green Burial Council as a Level 3 Natural Burial Ground.

New York
Greensprings Natural Cemetery Preserve was founded in 2004 and has been providing natural burial services since 2006. The preserve, located on the top of Irish Hill in Newfield, New York, covers 130 acres of rolling meadows and is surrounded by 8,000 acres of Cornell University's Arnot Forest and Newfield State Forest.

Life After Life is a nation-wide green provider based in the State of New York. They focus on habitat restoration in urban areas and power their modern memorial parks using a variety of digital technologies.

Ohio
Foxfield Preserve, adjacent to The Wilderness Center's headquarters near Wilmot, Ohio, was the first nature preserve cemetery in the US to be operated by a nonprofit conservation organization. Naturalists from The Wilderness Center have restored this formerly agricultural land to native prairie grasses and wildflowers. A section has also been reforested in native hardwood trees.

Kokosing Nature Preserve is a conservation burial ground located in Gambier, Ohio. A project of the Philander Chase Conservancy, Kenyon College's land trust, the preserve offers a natural burial option on twenty-three acres of restored prairies and woodlands.

Oregon
River View Cemetery, located in Portland, Oregon, is registered with the Green Burial Council as a "hybrid" natural burial cemetery. Rather than restricting natural burials to just one specific section, River View permits natural burial in nearly every area of the cemetery, allowing those who wish to be interred in existing family plots without an outer burial container, without embalming, or even without a casket if they choose to do so.

Pennsylvania
Penn Forest Natural Burial Park is the first Natural Burial Grounds in Pennsylvania certified by the Green Burial Council. Burial sites comprise 2.5 acres of the property.

South Carolina
Ramsey Creek Preserve is a green burial site which was established in South Carolina in 1998. This cemetery was opened to allow for burials where bodies are not embalmed or cremated, because of concern about the negative impacts that the chemicals and processes of these funeral preparation methods may have on the environment—which is why it is considered "green".

Texas
Countryside Memorial Park located near Marion, Texas, southeast of San Antonio is a natural, green burial park. All burials occur at a depth of approximately 3 to 3½ feet and have a 2–3 foot mound of earth above them. This depth ensures that the nutrient layer is raised to a higher soil stratum where microbes and oxygen can expedite the decomposition process. Each burial is covered by approximately 60 inches of soil and is undetectable to human or animal noses (with the exception of bears, which are not an issue in Texas). Countryside was incorporated as a cemetery in 1991 but several pioneers were buried on the property previously, the latest being interred in 1869. At 1 1/2 acres, thus far 300 plots have been surveyed. It is primarily a meadow, though there are some mature oak trees on the property, with plans for additional tree planting on designated plots. Cattle graze the park in season.

Eloise Woods Community Natural Burial Park was established in 2010 and is located in a wooded preserve near Cedar Creek, Texas. Burials are only permitted in areas that will not degrade the land. Some areas of the preserve are "off limits" whereas other areas are suitable for cremated remains. These decisions are based on what is best for the ecological restoration of the preserve. The total land for the preserve is less than 10 acres.

Tennessee
Larkspur Conservation is Tennessee's first nature preserve for natural burial. Located just outside Nashville, this conservation burial ground protects 112 acres of rare mixed-mesophytic forest and prairie in partnership with The Nature Conservancy.

Virginia
Duck Run Cemetery, in Rockingham County outside Harrisonburg, is the first natural burial cemetery in Virginia.

Wisconsin
Circle Cemetery, located at Circle Sanctuary Nature Preserve in southwestern Wisconsin, has offered burial of cremated remains and non-embalmed bodies since 1995. It is operated by Circle Sanctuary, a Wiccan church.

=== Brazil ===
In Brazil, ecological burials are becoming more popular each day. The traditional burial in Brazil is a wake where families and friends mourn their lost ones, following with burial of the dead person, the dead person is placed in a wooden coffin, and buried underneath. There are a few ecological burials being practiced in Brazil recently, such as liquefaction burial which is a process where the body molecules are broken down with heated water reducing gas, the tissues are dissolved, the bones are completely removed. Another form would be human composting, which has a lower environmental impact then cremation and other traditional forms of burials, it discharges fewer gases such as carbon dioxide, this form of burial is also very beneficial to plants, just like plant decomposing. Of course, there are other forms of ecological burials, but these 2 are one of many being practiced in Brazil.

== In the media ==
Toward the end of its final season in 2005, the HBO series Six Feet Under prominently featured natural burial.

The 2014 documentary A Will for the Woods explores natural burial, primarily through the lens of one terminally ill North Carolina man's decision to have one.

== See also ==
- Excarnation
- Hindu burial
- Islamic burial
- Jewish burial
- Plastination
- Promession
