= Water cremation =

Body decomposition process

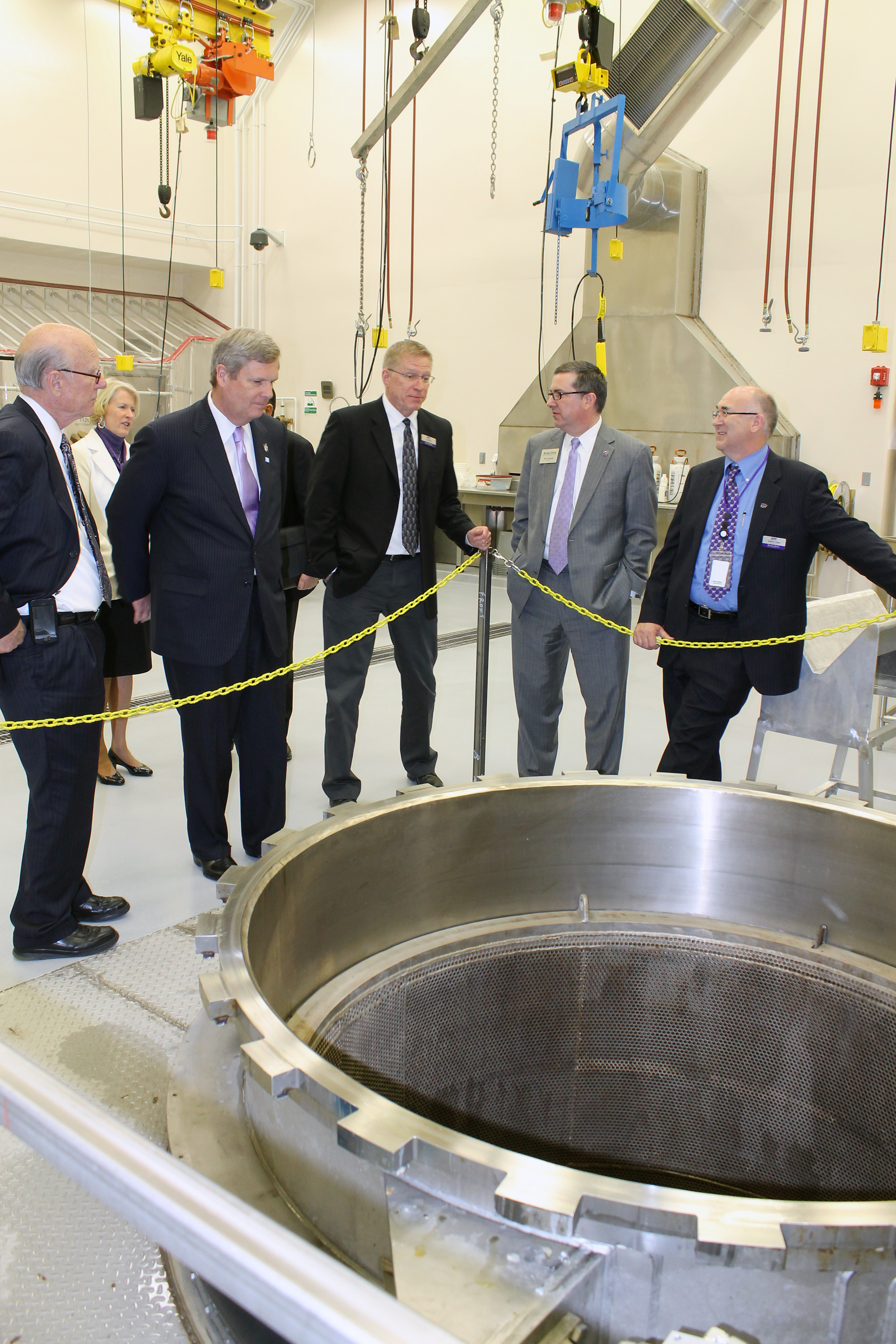
An alkaline hydrolysis disposal system at the Biosecurity Research Institute inside of Pat Roberts Hall at Kansas State University

Alkaline hydrolysis (also called biocremation, resomation, flameless cremation, aquamation or water cremation) is a process for the disposal of human and animal remains using lye and heat; it is an alternative to burial, cremation, or sky burial.

== Process ==
The process is based on alkaline hydrolysis: the body is placed in a pressure vessel which is then filled with a mixture of water and potassium hydroxide, and heated to a temperature of around 160 °C (320 °F) at an elevated pressure which precludes boiling. The body is efficiently broken down into its chemical components, completely disintegrating its DNA, a process which takes approximately four to six hours. Also, lower temperatures (98 °C (208 °F)) and pressures may be used such that the process takes 14 to 16 hours. At the start, the mixture is very alkaline, with a pH level of approximately 14; this drops to approximately 11 by the end, but the exact value depends on the total operation time and the amount of fat in the body.

Alkaline hydrolysis treatment times of infected animal carcasses
Pathogen	Temperature	Pressure	Time
Microbial	212 °F; 100 °C	15 psi 100 kPa	3 hours
TSE	300 °F; 149 °C	70 psi 480 kPa	6–8 hours

The result is a quantity of green-brown tinted liquid (containing amino acids, peptides, sugars and salts) and soft, porous white bone remains (calcium phosphate) easily crushed in the hand (although a cremulator is more commonly used) to form a white-colored dust. The "ash" can then be returned to the next of kin of the deceased. The liquid is disposed of either through the sanitary sewer system, or through some other method, including use in a garden or green space. To dispose of 1,000 pounds (450 kg) of biomass, approximately 60–240 US gallons (230–910 L; 50–200 imp gal) of water are used, resulting in 120–300 US gallons (450–1,140 L; 100–250 imp gal) of effluent, which carries a dried weight (inorganic and mineral content) of 20 pounds (9.1 kg) (approximately 2% of original weight).

This alkaline hydrolysis process has been championed by a number of ecological campaigning groups, for using 90 kWh of electricity, one-quarter the energy of flame-based cremation, and producing less carbon dioxide and pollutants. It is being presented as an alternative option at some British crematorium sites. As of August 2007, about 1,000 people had chosen this method for the disposal of their remains in the United States. The operating cost of materials, maintenance, and labor associated with the disposal of 2,000 pounds (910 kg) of remains was estimated at $116.40 in 2016, excluding the capital investment cost of equipment.

Alkaline hydrolysis has also been adopted by the pet and animal industry. A handful of companies in North America offer the procedure as an alternative to pet cremation. Alkaline hydrolysis is also used in the agricultural industry to sterilize animal carcasses that may pose a health hazard, because the process inactivates viruses, bacteria, and prions that cause transmissible spongiform encephalopathy.

=== History ===
The process was patented by Amos Herbert Hobson in 1888 as a method to process animal carcasses into plant food. In 2005, Bio-Response Solutions designed, sold, and installed the first single cadaver alkaline hydrolysis system at the Mayo Clinic, where it was still in use as of 2019. In 2007, a Scottish biochemist, Sandy Sullivan, started a company making the machines, and calling the process (and company) Resomation.

== Religious views ==
In Christian countries and cultures, cremation has historically been discouraged and viewed as a desecration of God's image, and as interference with the resurrection of the dead taught in scripture. It is now acceptable to some denominations. Desmond Tutu, former Anglican Archbishop of Cape Town, was aquamated, per his wish. The Eastern Orthodox Church does not allow cremation.

The Catholic Church allows cremation of bodies as long as it is not done in denial of the beliefs in the sacredness of the human body or the resurrection of the dead. In 2008, Renée Mirkes published the first Catholic moral analysis of alkaline hydrolysis. He argued that it is morally neutral and may be an alternative to burial on similar grounds to cremation. However, the Catholic Church in the United States does not approve of alkaline hydrolysis as a method of final disposal of human remains.

In 2011, Donald Cardinal Wuerl, Archbishop of Washington and then chairman of the Committee on Doctrine of the United States Conference of Catholic Bishops (USCCB), determined it "unnecessarily disrespectful of the human body." The Archdiocese of St. Louis explained that it was considered this way because the Church took concern with the final disposal of the liquid solution, which is typically to the sewer system. This was considered disrespectful of the sanctity of the human body. Additionally, when alkaline hydrolysis was proposed in New York state in 2012, the New York State Catholic Conference condemned the practice, stating that hydrolysis does not show sufficient respect for the teaching of the intrinsic dignity of the human body.

Judaism forbids cremation as it is not in line with the religion’s teachings of respect and dignity for humans, who are believed by the religion to be created in God’s image. Islam also forbids cremation of the deceased. Both religions are likely to reject alkaline hydrolysis as they believe that the body must be laid to rest through burial in order to prepare for the afterlife. The Baháʼí Faith, like other Abrahamic religions, discourages cremation of the deceased. The human body is seen as having to be treated with respect, and merely wrapped in a shroud before burial no further than an hour from the place of death.

Sikhism, Hinduism, and Buddhism each place theological emphasis on the complete immolation of the corpse.

Native Hawaiians consider aquamation a way to approximate their traditional burial ritual, which involves removing the bones (iwi) cleanly from the flesh using a beachside underground oven (imu), wrapping the bones, and hiding them. The use of an imu on human bodies is no longer allowed, but aquamation may offer an alternative as it produces similarly clean bones.

== Legal status ==
=== Australia ===
Aquamation based in New South Wales is the only company to provide alkaline hydrolysis in Australia, with the remains being used as fertilizer on plantation forests, due to difficulty with obtaining permits from Sydney Water.

=== New Zealand ===
Water Cremation Aotearoa has been an advocate for bringing the service to New Zealand (Aotearoa). Bell, Lamb and Trotter, in Christchurch, started to offer water cremation in June 2025.

=== Belgium ===
==== Flanders ====
The Flemish minister of Interior Administration Bart Somers asked in September 2021 the opinion of an advisory bioethics committee on resomation. The advice, received in November 2021, saw no objections.

In October 2025 a scientific trial project was launched at one crematorium in Wilrijk (Antwerp). During the trial, only bodies donated to science are eligible for resomation. The aim of the study is to determine the environmental impact, while also investigating ethical questions. The trial will be monitored by the University of Antwerp, KU Leuven, the Flemish Institute for Technological Research (VITO) and Aquafin.

=== Canada ===
Saskatchewan approved the process in 2012, becoming the first province to do so. Quebec and Ontario have also legalized the process. A funeral home in Granby, Quebec, was the first in the province to receive an alkaline hydrolysis machine. In June 2025 a Manitoba company became the first in the province to offer the service.

=== Ireland ===
In 2023, water cremation became available in Ireland, making it the first country in Europe to offer this form of burial.

When the process is complete, the remaining water undergoes further treatment to ensure that it is completely sterile. Analysis is then completed to ensure Water Authority standards are met. At this stage, the water can be recycled back to the Local Authority water treatment plant.

=== Mexico ===
Since 2019, Grupo Gayosso offers alkaline hydrolysis in Baja California.

=== The Netherlands ===
In May 2020, the Health Council of the Netherlands issued an advisory report on the admissibility of new techniques of disposing of the dead. The Council proposed a framework to assess alkaline hydrolysis. It concluded that alkaline hydrolysis is safe, dignified and sustainable. In addition to alkaline hydrolysis, the council also considered human composting as a technique to dispose bodies yet concluded that too little is known about composting and hence it cannot be assessed whether this technique fulfills the conditions. Taking into account the council's recommendations, the Ministry of the Interior and Kingdom Relations prepared a law proposal to amend the Corpse Disposal Act. Once the proposed law has been submitted to the Parliament, the democratic process to admit alkaline hydrolysis as body disposal technique can be commenced.

=== Singapore ===
In Singapore, aquamation has been available for pets since 2023, but is not yet available for humans pending government approval.

=== South Africa ===
In November 2019, Avbob introduced aquamation in South Africa, following the mutual assurance society's recent introduction of the alkaline hydrolysis process at its Maitland agency in Cape Town. Aquamation has been legal in South Africa since then. Following his death in December 2021 the body of Archbishop Desmond Tutu was aquamated.

=== United Kingdom ===
A public crematorium operated by Sandwell Metropolitan Borough Council at Rowley Regis, central England, was the first to receive planning permission to offer the process but in March 2017, the local water utility, Severn Trent Water, refused the council's application for a "trade effluent permit" because there was no water industry standard regulating the disposal of liquefied human remains into sewers.

Scotland legalized water cremations in March 2026.

=== United States ===
Alkaline hydrolysis as a method of final disposition of human remains is legal in 24 states as of 2022. Legislation is pending in New Jersey, New York, Ohio, Pennsylvania, and Virginia. The process was legal in New Hampshire for several years but amid opposition by religious lobby groups it was banned in 2008 and a proposal to legalize it was rejected in 2013. Alkaline hydrolysis has been used for cadavers donated for research at the University of Florida since the mid-1990s and at the Mayo Clinic since 2005. UCLA uses the process to dispose of donor bodies.

Alkaline hydrolysis policy by state
State	Policy	Year	Legislation	Notes	Ref.
Alabama		2017	H-212	Added definition of alkaline hydrolysis.	
Arizona		2022	HB2024	Approved alkaline hydrolysis licensure.	
California		2017	AB967	Alkaline hydrolysis has been used at UCLA since 1995 for donated cadavers. Previously, AB 1615 (2012) was advanced and passed the Assembly, but died in Senate.	
Colorado		2011	HB11-1178		
Connecticut		2016	SSB 142	Available.	
Florida		2010	SB1152	In use at the University of Florida since the mid-1990s.	
Georgia		2012	HB933	SB296 pending in House to remove conflicting language.	
Hawaii		2022	HB1894	Signed into law July, 2022	
Idaho		2014	Docket 24-0801-1301	Adopted in a docket amending the Rules of the State Board of Morticians, available only in Coeur d'Alene.	
Illinois		2012	SB1830	Enacted as Public Act 97–0679. Available.	
Indiana		2025	HB1044	Bill passed the House but stalled in Senate.	
Kansas		2010	HB2310	Amended K.S.A. 65–1760 to define cremation as "the mechanical and/or other dissolution process that reduces human remains to bone fragments." Unavailable except KCMO.	
Maine		2009	144 CMR 244	Available.	
Maryland		2011	HB995	Added definition for cremation as "the process of reducing human remains to bone fragments through intense heat and evaporation, including any mechanical or thermal process." Unavailable within state.	
Minnesota		2003	SF1071	In use at the Mayo Clinic since 2005. Available.	
Missouri		?	?	20 CSR 2120–2.071 does not prohibit alkaline hydrolysis in the definition of cremation.	
Nevada		2017	AB205	Available.	
New Hampshire		2008	SB332	Approved from 2006–2008; Legislation to reinstate approval was rejected in 2013.	
North Carolina		2018	GS 90-210.136	Available.	
Oklahoma		2021	Title 59 Sec.396.2	Approved 2021, available as of 2023	
Oregon		2009	SB796	Added "dissolution" to the definition of final disposal. Available.	
Tennessee		2013	HB1125	Availability unclear.	
Texas		2017	HB1155	Bill died in committee.	
Utah		2018	HB0121	Available at least one location.	
Vermont		2014	H.656	Minor Funeral Home and Bear Trap Crematory is the sole provider in the state	
Virginia		2023	SB1487	Bill passed in House, but died in Senate.	
Washington		2020	SB 5001	Available.	
Wyoming		2014	HB25	Enrolled Act No. 21 adds definition for "chemical disposition." However, unavailable as of 2022.	

== Notable individuals ==
- Desmond Tutu (1931–2021), South African Anglican archbishop and Nobel Peace Prize laureate, underwent alkaline hydrolysis following his funeral in January 2022, in accordance with his wishes for an environmentally friendly funeral.
- Patrick Stewart (1940–2026), British actor known for his roles in Star Trek: The Next Generation and the X-Men films, underwent alkaline hydrolysis on November 3, 2026, according to his death certificate.

== See also ==
- Burial at sea
- Promession
- Human composting
