= Burial =

Ritual act of placing a dead person or animal into the ground

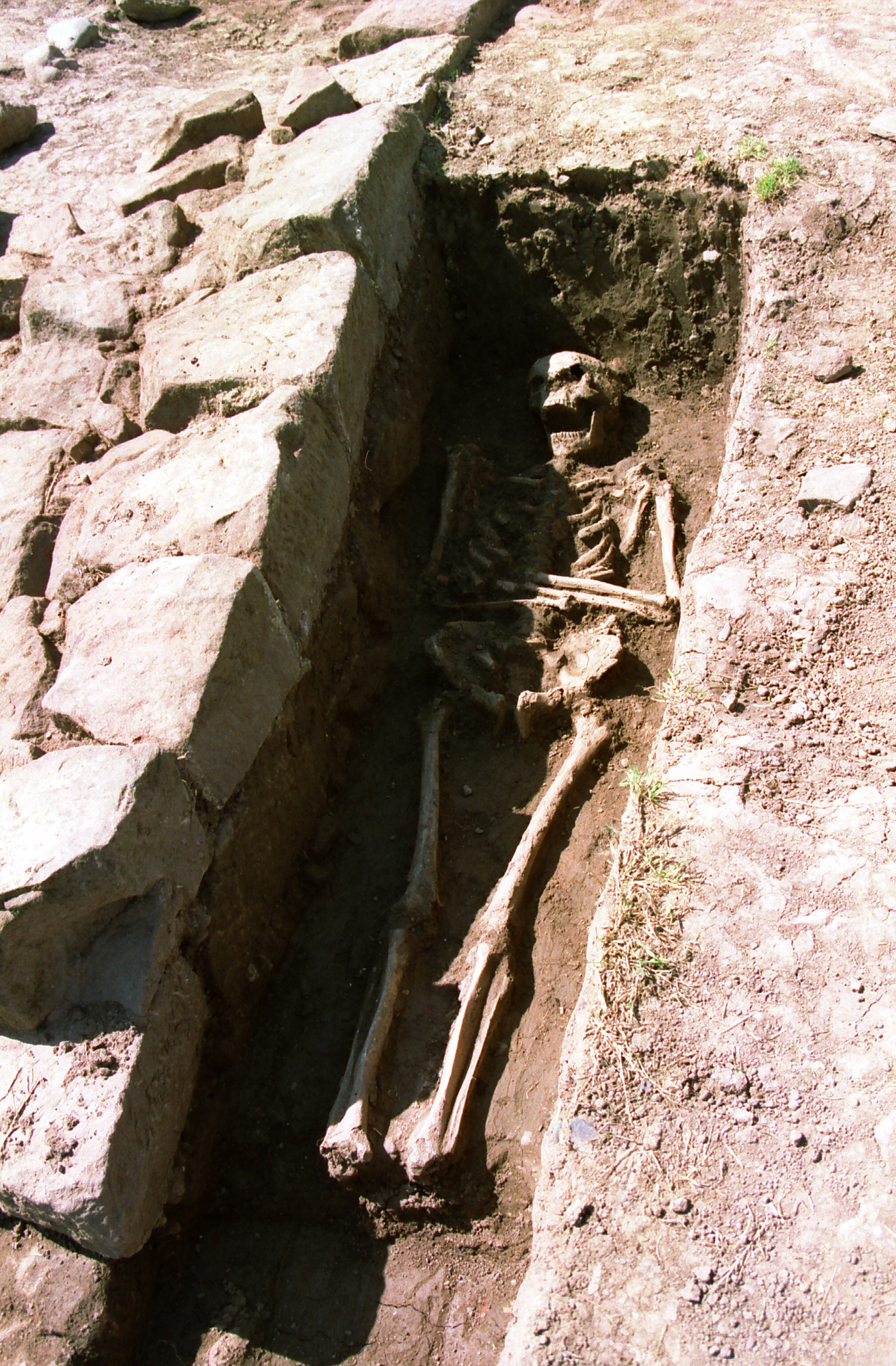
Unearthed grave from the medieval Poulton Chapel

Burial, also known as interment or inhumation, is a method of final disposition whereby a dead body is placed into the ground or in a structure such as a mausoleum, sometimes with objects. This is usually accomplished by excavating a pit or trench, placing the deceased and objects in it, and covering it over. A funeral is a ceremony that accompanies the final disposition.

Evidence suggests that some archaic and early modern humans buried their dead. Burial is often seen as indicating respect for the dead. It has been used to prevent the odor of decay, to give family members closure and prevent them from witnessing the decomposition of their loved ones, and in many cultures it has been seen as a necessary step for the deceased to enter the afterlife or to give back to the cycle of life.

Methods of burial may be heavily ritualized and can include natural burial (sometimes called "green burial"); embalming or mummification; and the use of containers for the dead, such as shrouds, coffins, grave liners, and burial vaults, all of which can slow decomposition of the body. Sometimes objects or grave goods are buried with the body, which may be dressed in fancy or ceremonial garb. Depending on the culture, the manner in which the body is positioned may have great significance.

The location of the burial may be determined by taking into account concerns surrounding health and sanitation, religious concerns, and cultural practices. Some cultures keep the dead close to provide guidance to the living, while others "banish" them by locating burial grounds at a distance from inhabited areas. Some religions consecrate special ground to bury the dead, and some families build private family cemeteries.

Most modern cultures document the location of graves with headstones, which may be inscribed with information and tributes to the deceased. However, some people are buried in anonymous or secret graves for various reasons. Sometimes multiple bodies are buried in a single grave either by choice (as in the case of married couples), due to space concerns, or in the case of mass graves as a way to deal with many bodies at once.

Alternatives to traditional burial include cremation (and subsequent interment), burial at sea and cryopreservation. Some human cultures may bury the remains of beloved animals.

== History ==
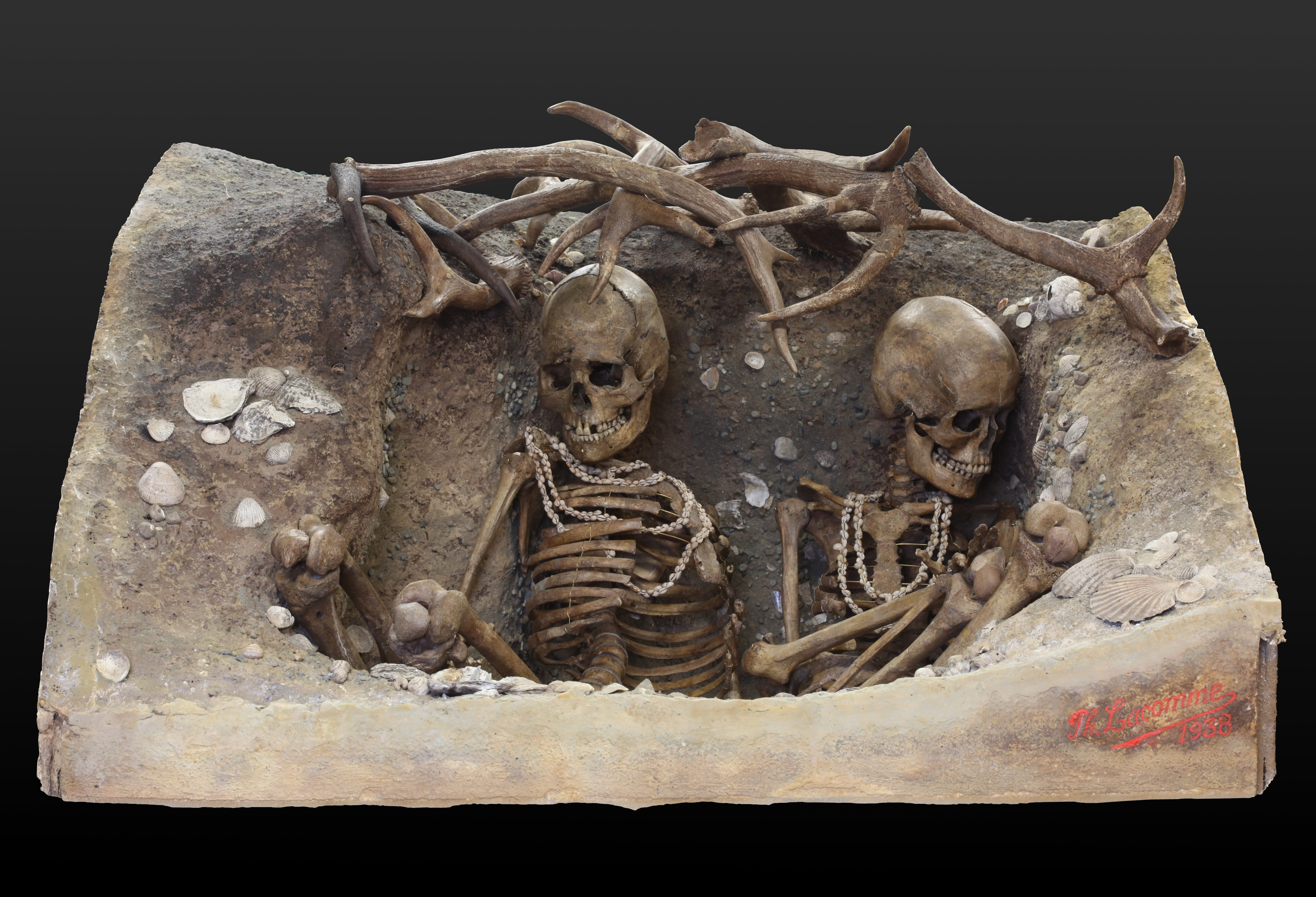
Reconstruction of the Mesolithic tomb of two women from Téviec, Brittany

Intentional burial, particularly with grave goods, may be one of the earliest detectable forms of religious practice since, as Philip Lieberman suggests, it may signify a "concern for the dead that transcends daily life". Evidence points to the Neanderthals as the first human species known to practice burial behavior and to intentionally bury their dead; they did so using shallow graves furnished with stone tools and animal bones. Exemplary sites include Shanidar in Iraq, Kebara Cave in Israel and Krapina in Croatia. Some scholars, however, argue that such "buried" bodies may have been disposed of for secular reasons.

Though there is ongoing debate regarding the reliability of the dating method, some scholars believe the earliest human burial dates back 100,000 years. Archeological expeditions have discovered human skeletal remains stained with red ochre in the Skhul cave at Qafzeh in Israel. A variety of grave goods were present at the site, including the mandible of a wild boar in the arms of one of the skeletons. The remains of a 3-year-old child at Panga ya Saidi cave in Kenya dating to 78,000 years ago also show signs suggestive of a burial, such as the digging of a pit, laying of the body in a fetal position and intentional rapid covering of the corpse.

In ancient Egypt, burial customs developed during the Predynastic period. Round graves with one pot were used in the Badarian Period (4400–3800 B.C.E.), continuing the tradition of Omari and Maadi cultures.

Archeologists refer to unmarked prehistoric cemeteries using the neutral term "grave field". Grave fields are one of the chief sources of information on prehistoric cultures, and numerous archaeological cultures are labelled and defined by their burial customs, such as the Urnfield culture of the European Bronze Age.

Illumination of a funeral in a medieval book of hours

During the Early Middle Ages, the reopening of graves and manipulation of the corpses or artifacts contained within them was a widespread phenomenon and a common part of the life course of early medieval cemeteries across Western and Central Europe. The reopening of furnished or recent burials occurred especially from the 5th to the 8th centuries CE over the broad zone of European row-grave-style furnished inhumation burial, which comprised the regions of Romania, Hungary, the Czech Republic, Slovakia, Switzerland, Austria, Germany, the Low Countries, France, and South-eastern England.

Medieval European Christianity sometimes developed complex burial rituals and attached great importance to their correct performance: the fate of the soul of the deceased might depend on observing the proper ceremonial. For example:

If you were to make it to heaven [...] you had to be interred correctly, for burial was the passage out of this world. The body had to be shrouded in the expectation that it would be reborn into eternal life. Then, on the eve of burial, the corpse had to be taken to church on a torch-lit bier and placed in the darkness of the nave, then laid in front of the high altar, surrounded by candles. The next day, in front of the whole community, a requiem mass was to be sung and the paschal candle lit [...]. Following this, there were prayers, hymns, special masses, and the body was borne to the grave, sprinkled with holy water and buried in consecrated ground. It must be laid head up with its feet to the east, for it was from this direction that Christ would return, from New Jerusalem, at the Apocalypse, when the worthy dead would be resurrected. [...] If burial rituals went awry, one's immortal soul was jeopardised. [...] Personal salvation – breaking free from the corporeal prison and ascending to a spiritual sphere unencumbered by materiality – is the logical culmination of the myth of humanity's supposed dominion over nature. [...].

== Reasons for human burial ==
After death, a body will decay. Burial is not necessarily a public health requirement. Contrary to conventional wisdom, the World Health Organization advises that only corpses carrying an infectious disease strictly require burial.

Human burial practices are the manifestation of the human desire to demonstrate "respect for the dead". Cultures vary in their mode of respect.

Some reasons follow:

- There is respect for the physical remains. If left lying on top of the ground, scavengers may eat the corpse, considered disrespectful to the deceased in many (but not all) cultures. In Tibet, sky burials deliberately encourage scavenging of human remains in the interest of returning them to nature, just as within Zoroastrianism, where burial and cremation were often seen as impure (as human remains are polluted, while the earth and fire are sacred).
- Burial can be seen as an attempt to bring closure to the deceased's family and friends. Psychologists in some Western Judeo-Christian quarters, as well as the US funeral industry, claim that by interring a body away from plain view the pain of losing a loved one can be lessened.
- Many cultures believe in an afterlife. Burial is sometimes believed to be a necessary step for an individual to reach the afterlife.
- Many religions prescribe a particular way to live, which includes customs relating to disposal of the dead.
- A decomposing body releases unpleasant gases related to decomposition. As such, burial is seen as a means of preventing smells from expanding into open air.

== Burial methods ==
In many cultures, human corpses were usually buried in soil. The roots of burial as a practice reach back into the Middle Palaeolithic and coincide with the appearance of Homo neanderthalensis and Homo sapiens, in Europe and Africa respectively. As a result, burial grounds are found throughout the world. Through time, mounds of earth, temples, and caverns were used to store the dead bodies of ancestors. In modern times, the custom of burying dead people below ground, with a stone marker to indicate the burial place, is used in most cultures; although other means such as cremation are becoming more popular in the West (cremation is the norm in India and mandatory in big metropolitan areas of Japan).

Some burial practices are heavily ritualized; others are simply practical.

=== Burial depth ===
It is a common misconception that graves must be dug to a depth of six feet (1.8 metres). This is reflected in the common euphemism for death of six feet under. In fact, graves are rarely dug to this depth except when it is intended to later bury a further coffin or coffins on top of the first one. In such cases, more than six feet may be dug, to provide the required depth of soil above the top coffin.

In the United States, there is no nationwide regulation of burial depth. Each local authority is free to determine its own rules. Requirements for depth can vary according to soil type and by method of burial. California, for instance, requires only 19 inches of soil above the top of the coffin, but more commonly 30 to 36 inches are required in other places. In some areas, such as central Appalachia, graves were indeed once dug to a depth of six feet to prevent the body being disturbed by burrowing animals. However, this was unnecessary once metal caskets and concrete vaults started to be used.

In the United Kingdom, soil is required to be to a depth of three feet above the highest point of the coffin, unless the burial authority consider the soil to be suitable for a depth of only two feet.

The earliest known reference to a requirement for a six-foot burial occurred in 1665 during the Great Plague of London. John Lawrence, the Lord Mayor of London, ordered that the bodies of plague victims "...shall be at least six foot deep." The city officials apparently believed this would inhibit the spread of the disease, not realising that the true vector was fleas living on rats in the streets. In the event, there were so many victims that very few were buried in individual graves. Most were placed in massive plague pits so it is unlikely that this event alone gave rise to the "six feet" tradition.

=== Natural burial ===
Natural burial—also called "green burial"—is the process by which a body is returned to the earth to decompose naturally in soil, and in some cases even protect native and endangered wildlife. Natural burial became popularized in the UK in the early 1990s by Ken West, a professional cremator operator for the city of Carlisle, responding to the U.K's call for changes in government that aligned with the United Nations' Environmental Program Local Agenda 21. In addition, there are multiple green burial sites in the U.S. Green burials are developing in Canada (Victoria, BC, and Cobourg, Ontario), as well as in Australia and Ireland.

The increase in popularity of alternative burials can be seen as a direct choice of the individual's want to distance themselves from religious practices and spiritual locations as well as an opportunity to exercise their act of choice. The desire to live through nature as well as concern for the environment have been the backbone of the green burial movement. The use of coffins made from alternative materials such as wicker and biodegradable materials as well as trees and other flora are being used in place of headstones. Both practices provide sustainable alternatives to traditional burial practices.

Natural burials have been attracting people for reasons outside of environmental and sustainability factors as well. With the expansion of urban centres, ecological corridors gradually disappear. Cemeteries for burial plots preclude alternative uses of the land for a long time. By combining these two aspects (need for connectivity and land take imposed by cemeteries), two positive results can be achieved: protecting memories of the past and connecting ecosystems with multiple-use corridors. Green burials appeal to people for economic reasons. Traditional burial practices can be a financial burden causing some to turn to green burials as a cheaper alternative. Some people view green burials as more meaningful, especially for those who have a connection to a piece of land, such as current residence or other places that hold meaning for them.

==== Types ====
===== Conservation burial =====
Conservation burial is a type of burial where burial fees fund the acquisition and management of new land to benefit native habitat, ecosystems and species. This usually involves a legal document such as a conservation easement. Such burials go beyond other forms of natural burial, which aim to prevent environmental damage caused by conventional burial techniques, by actually increasing benefits for the environment. The idea is for the burial process to be a net positive for the earth rather than just neutral. Scientists have argued that such burials could potentially generate enough funds to save every endangered species on the planet. The Green Burial Council certifies natural and conservation burial grounds in the U.S. and Canada.

===== Alkaline hydrolysis =====
Alkaline hydrolysis, also referred to as resomation, is another approach to natural burial. It uses high temperature water mixed with potassium hydroxide to dissolve human remains. During this process, the body is put into an enclosed, stainless steel chamber. The chamber fills with the chemical and water solution and is then lightly circulated. After a couple of hours, the body is worn down and bone is the only thing that remains. The bones are then pressed down into a powder and returned to the associated family. The outcome is comparable to cremation, but results in an environmentally friendly process that does not release chemical emissions and greenhouse gases into the atmosphere, as was confirmed after a review by the Health Council of the Netherlands. After this process, the water used goes to a regular water treatment facility where it is filtered and cleaned and returned to the water cycle. At this time, resomation is permitted for commercial use in areas throughout the U.S. However, several other countries, including the UK are considering using this technology within their medical schools and universities.

===== Mushroom burial =====
Mushroom burial has been developed by Jae Rhim Lee and her colleagues to address the impact traditional burial approaches have on the environment. It is an eco-friendly process which consists of dressing the cadaver in a bodysuit with mushroom spores woven into it, nicknamed the Infinity Burial Suit. Rhim developed her own mushrooms by feeding them her hair, skin, and nails to create a mushroom variety that will best decompose human remains. As the mushrooms grow, they consume the remains within the suit as well as the toxins that are being released by the body. Rhim and her colleagues created this suit as a symbol of a new way for people to think about the relationship between their body after death and the environment.

===== Tree pod burials =====
Another method of natural burial is being developed to plant the human body in fetal position inside an egg shaped pod. The pod containing the body will form a biodegradable capsule that will not harm the surrounding earth. The biodegradable capsule doubles as a seed which can be customized to grow into either a birch, maple, or eucalyptus tree. The goal of this method is to create parks full of trees that loved ones can walk through and mourn, as opposed to a graveyard full of tombstones. This method aims to return the body to the earth in the most environmentally friendly way possible.

The tree pod method originated in the UK but is now becoming a more popular method of burial. The definition of natural burial grounds suggests that people are being buried without any kind of formaldehyde-based embalming fluid or synthetic ingredients, and that the bodies that are being returned to the earth will also be returning nutrients to the environment, in a way that is less expensive than other available burial methods. Not only are tree pods a more cost effective and environmentally friendly way to memorialize loved ones, this method also offers emotional support. The memories of loved ones will be immortalized through the concept of a deceased person having a medium (trees) that will continue to live and grow.

=== Prevention of decay ===
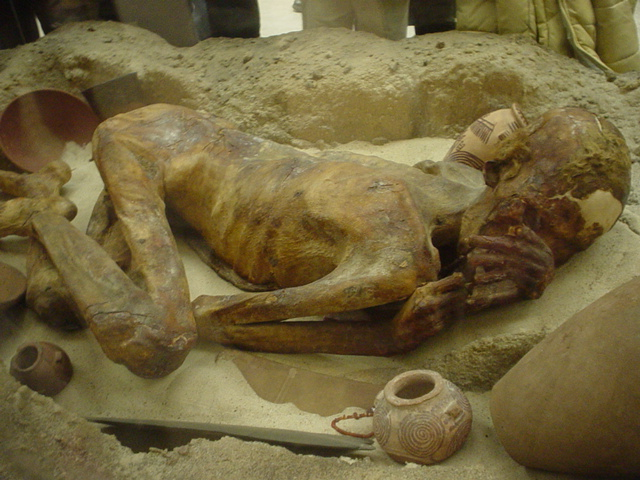
A naturally mummified body in the British Museum

Embalming is the practice of preserving a body against decay and is used in many cultures. Mummification is a more extensive method of embalming, further delaying the decay process.

Bodies are often buried wrapped in a shroud or placed in a coffin (or in some cases, a casket). A larger container may be used, such as a ship. In the U.S., coffins are usually covered by a grave liner or a burial vault, which prevents the coffin from collapsing under the weight of the earth or floating away during a flood.

These containers slow the decomposition process by (partially) physically blocking decomposing bacteria and other organisms from accessing the corpse. An additional benefit of using containers to hold the body is that if the soil covering the corpse is washed away by a flood or some other natural process then the corpse will still not be exposed to open air.

=== Inclusion of clothing and personal effects ===
The body may be dressed in fancy and/or ceremonial clothes. Personal objects of the deceased, such as a favorite piece of jewelry or photograph, may be included with the body. This practice, also known as the inclusion of grave goods, serves several purposes:

- In funeral services, the body is often put on display. Many cultures feel that the deceased should be presented looking their finest. Others dress the deceased in burial shrouds, which range from very simple to elaborate depending on the culture.
- The inclusion of ceremonial garb and sacred objects is sometimes viewed as necessary for reaching the afterlife.
- The inclusion of personal effects may be motivated by the beliefs that in the afterlife people will wish to have with them what was important to them on earth. Alternatively, in some cultures, it is felt that, when a person dies, their possessions (and sometimes people connected to them such as wives) should go with them out of loyalty or ownership.
- Although not generally a motivation for the inclusion of grave goods with a corpse, it is worth considering that future archaeologists may find the remains (compare time capsule). Artifacts such as clothing and objects provide insight into how the individual lived. This provides a form of immortality for the deceased. In general, however, clothing buried with a body decays more rapidly than the same buried alone.

== Traditions ==
=== Body positioning ===
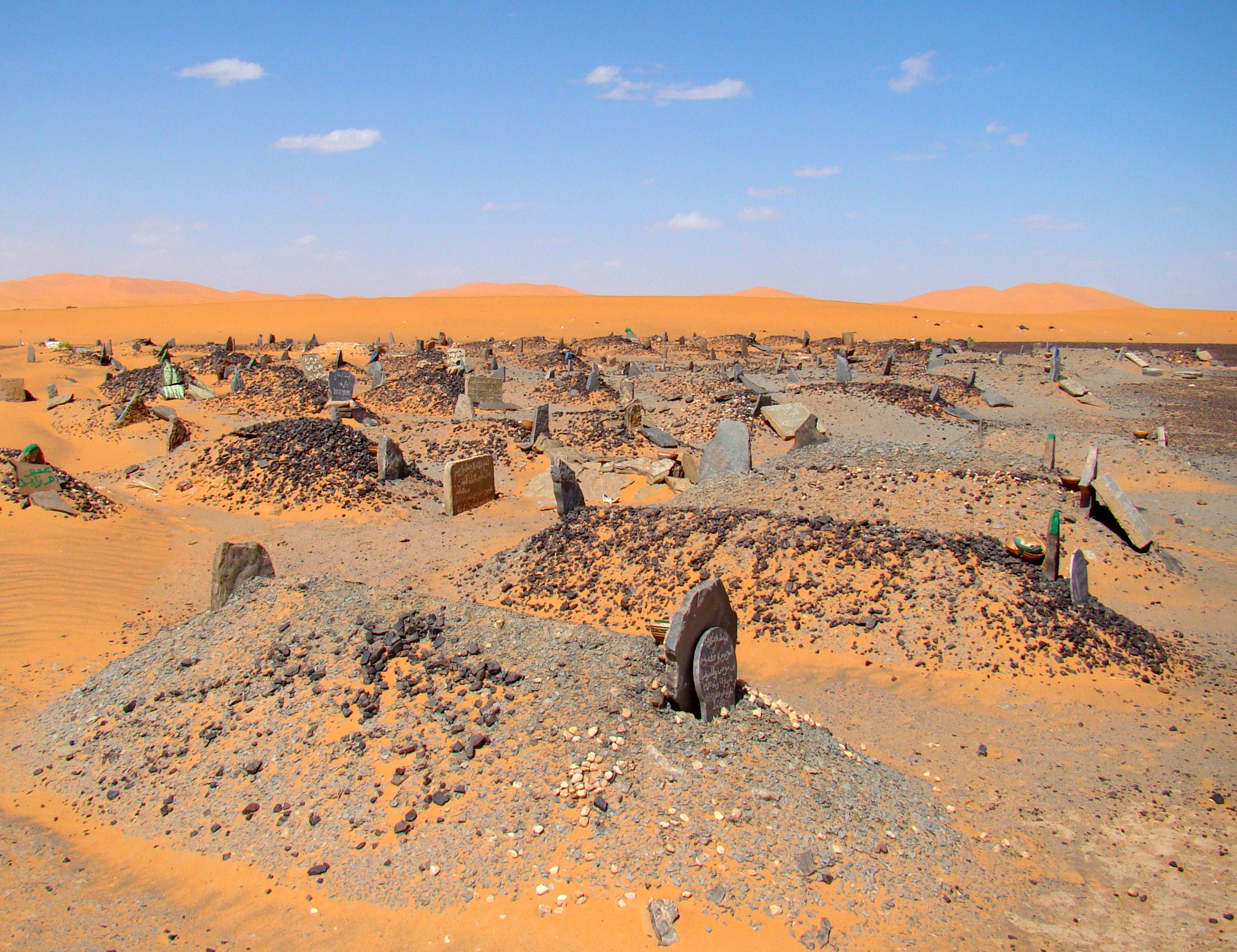
A Muslim cemetery in Sahara, with all graves placed at right angles to distant Mecca

Burials may be placed in a number of different positions. Bodies with the arms crossed date back to ancient cultures such as Chaldea in the 10th century BC, where the "X" symbolized their sky god. Later ancient Egyptian gods and royalty, from approximately 3500 B.C. are shown with crossed arms, such as the god Osiris, the Lord of the Dead, or mummified royalty with crossed arms in high and low body positions, depending upon the dynasty. The burial of bodies in the extended position refers to lying flat with arms and legs straight, or with the arms folded upon the chest, and with the eyes and mouth closed. Extended burials may be supine (lying on the back) or prone (lying on the front). However, in some cultures, being buried face down shows marked disrespect, like in the case of the Sioux. Other ritual practices place the body in a flexed position with the legs bent or crouched with the legs folded up to the chest. Warriors in some ancient societies were buried in an upright position. In Islam, the body is placed in supine position, hands along the sides and the head is turned to its right with the face towards the Qibla. Many cultures treat placement of dead people in an appropriate position to be a sign of respect even when burial is impossible.

In nonstandard burial practices, such as mass burial, the body may be positioned arbitrarily. This can be a sign of disrespect to the deceased, or at least nonchalance on the part of the inhumer, or due to considerations of time and space.

==== Orientation ====
Most often, a burial will be oriented to a specific direction for religious purposes, as are the case for persons of the Abrahamic faiths. Standard Jewish burials are made supine east-west, with the head at the western end of the grave, in order to face Jerusalem. In other cases, the body may be buried on a north-south axis, or, simply facing towards the exit of the cemetery or burial grounds. This is done in order to facilitate the return to Israel foretold of all those who are resurrected at the end of time following the coming of the Messiah. Historically, Christian burials followed similar principles, where the body was placed east-west, to mirror the layout of Christian churches, which were themselves oriented as such for much the same reason; to view the coming of Christ on Judgment day (Eschaton). In many Christian traditions, ordained clergy are traditionally buried in the opposite orientation, and their coffins carried likewise, so that at the General Resurrection they may rise facing, and ready to minister to, their people.

In an Islamic funeral, the grave should be aligned perpendicular to the Qibla (the direction to the Kaaba in Mecca) with the face turned to the right along the Qibla.

==== Inverted burial ====
For humans, maintaining an upside-down position, with the head vertically below the feet, is highly uncomfortable for any extended period of time, and consequently burial in that attitude (as opposed to attitudes of rest or watchfulness, as above) is highly unusual and generally symbolic. Occasionally suicides and assassins were buried upside down, as a post-mortem punishment and (as with burial at cross-roads) to inhibit the activities of the resulting undead.

In Gulliver's Travels, the Lilliputians buried their dead upside down:

They bury their dead with their heads directly downward, because they hold an opinion, that in eleven thousand moons they are all to rise again; in which period the earth (which they conceive to be flat) will turn upside down, and by this means they shall, at their resurrection, be found ready standing on their feet. The learnèd among them confess the absurdity of this doctrine; but the practice still continues, in compliance to the vulgar.

— Jonathan Swift, Gulliver's Travels, Part I, Chapter VI

Swift's notion of inverted burial might seem the highest flight of fancy, but it appears that among English millenarians the idea that the world would be "turned upside down" at the Apocalypse enjoyed some currency. There is at least one attested case of a person being buried upside down by instruction; a Major Peter Labilliere of Dorking (d. 4 June 1800) lies thus upon the summit of Box Hill. Similar stories have attached themselves to other noted eccentrics, particularly in southern England, but not always with a foundation in truth.

=== Burial traditions throughout the world ===
==== South Korea ====
South Korea's funeral arrangements have drastically changed in the course of only two decades according to Chang-Won Park. Park states that around the 1980s at home funeral ceremonies were the general norm, straying away from anywhere that was not a family home. Dying close to home, with friends and family, was considered a 'good death', while dying away from home was considered a 'bad death'. This gradually changed as the upper and middle class started holding funerals in the mortuaries of hospitals. This posed an issue for hospitals because of the rapid increase in funerals being held and maxing occupancy. This resolved when a law was passed to allow the civilian population to hold funerals in the mortuaries of hospitals. The lower class then followed suit, copying the newly set traditions of the upper classes. With this change, the practice of cremation became viewed more as an alternative to traditional burials. Cremation was first introduced by Buddhism, but was banned in 1470. It was not until the Japanese colonization period that cremation was reintroduced in 1945 and the ban later lifted. It took until 1998 for cremation to rapidly grow in popularity.

==== Tana Toraja ====
A TED Talk by Kelli Swazey discusses how Tana Toraja, a Sulawesi province in Eastern Indonesia, experiences death as a process, rather than an event. The culture of Tana Toraja views funerals as the most important event in a person's life. Because of this importance placed on death, Tana Toraja landscape is covered in the rituals and events transpired after death. The hierarchy of an individual's life is based on the sacrifices of animals made after their death. Funerals of the Tana Toraja people typically last days to even weeks. Death is seen as a transformation, rather than a private loss. A Torajan is not considered 'dead' until their family members are able to collect the resources necessary to hold a funeral that expresses the status of the deceased. Until these funerals are upheld the deceased are held in Tongkonan, built to house corpses that are not considered 'dead'. The deceased can be held in Tongkonan for years, waiting for their families to collect the necessary resources to hold a funeral. The Tongkonan represents both the identity of the family and the process of birth and death. The process of birth and death is shown by having the houses that individuals are born in be the same structure as the Tongkonan, houses that individuals die in. Until the funeral, the deceased being housed in the Tongkonan are symbolically treated as members of the family, still being cared for by family members.

==== Australian Aboriginals (Northern Territory) ====
Northern Territory Australian Aboriginals have unique traditions associated with a loved one's death. The death of a loved one sparks a series of events such as smoking out the spirit, a feast, and leaving the body out to decompose. Immediately after death, a smoking ceremony is held in the deceased's home. The smoking ceremonies purpose is to expel the spirit of the deceased from their living quarters. A feast is held where mourners are covered in ochre, an earthy pigment associated with clay, while they eat and dance. The traditional corpse disposal of the Aboriginals includes covering the corpse in leaves on a platform. The corpse is then left to decompose.

==== Iranian people ====
Graves are free if the owner is poor. Some ancient people ancient Iranians burial colored the dead body, while others fed the body to vultures and other birds or burned the bodies. Body parts cut during the procedure were sometimes buried separately.

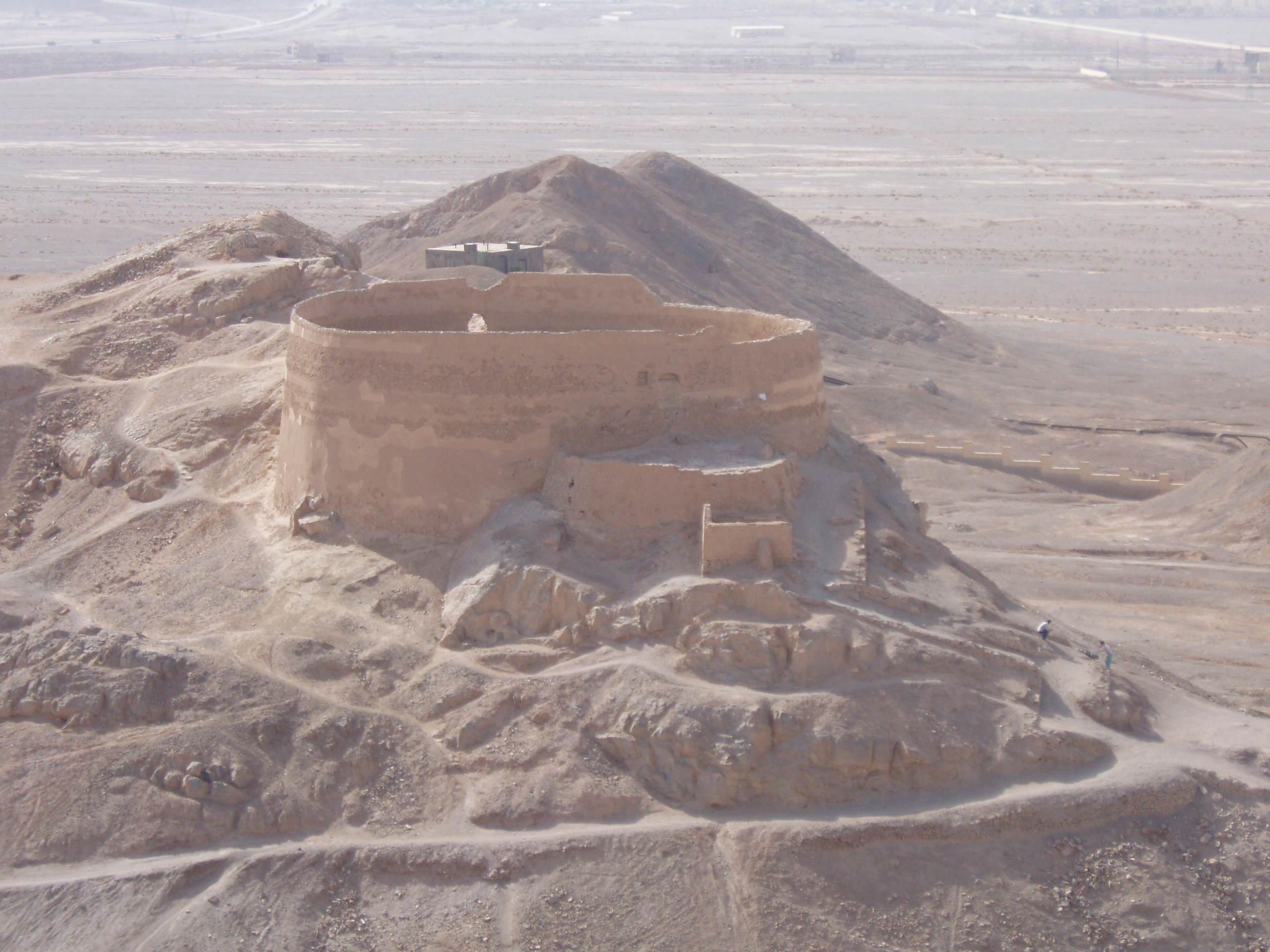
Zoroastrian Towers of Silence outside Yazd, Yazd province, Iran

=== Burial among African-American slaves ===
In the African-American slave community, slaves quickly adopted funeral procedures and the location of gravesites of family and friends. Specific slaves were assigned to prepare dead bodies, build coffins, dig graves, and construct headstones. Slave funerals were typically at night when the workday was over, with the master present to view all the ceremonial procedures. Slaves from nearby plantations were regularly in attendance.

At death, a slave's body was wrapped in cloth. The hands were placed across the chest, and a metal plate was placed on top of their hands. The reasoning for the plate was to hinder their return home by suppressing any spirits in the coffin. Often, personal property was buried with slaves to appease spirits. The coffins were nailed shut once the body was inside, and carried by hand or wagon, depending on the property designated for the slave burial site.

Slaves were buried oriented east to west, with feet at the eastern end and head at the western end and the person thus rising facing east. According to Christian doctrine, this orientation permitted rising to face the return of Christ without having to turn around upon the call of Gabriel's trumpet. Gabriel's trumpet would be blown near the eastern sunrise.

=== Burial in the Baháʼí Faith ===
In the Baháʼí Faith, burial law prescribes both the location of burial and burial practices and precludes cremation of the dead. It is forbidden to carry the body for more than one hour's journey from the place of death. Before interment the body should be wrapped in a shroud of silk or cotton, and a ring should be placed on its finger bearing the inscription "I came forth from God, and return unto Him, detached from all save Him, holding fast to His Name, the Merciful, the Compassionate". The coffin should be of crystal, stone or hard fine wood. Also, before interment, a specific Prayer for the Dead is ordained. The body should be placed with the feet facing the Qiblih. The formal prayer and the ring are meant to be used for those who have reached 15 years of age.

== Locations ==
=== Where to bury ===
Apart from sanitary and other practical considerations, the site of burial can be determined by religious and socio-cultural considerations.

Thus in some traditions, especially with an animistic logic, the remains of the dead are "banished" for fear their spirits would harm the living if too close; others keep remains close to help surviving generations.

Religious rules may prescribe a specific zone, e.g. some Christian traditions hold that Christians must be buried in consecrated ground, usually a cemetery; an earlier practice, burial in or very near the church (hence the word churchyard), was generally abandoned with individual exceptions as a high posthumous honour; also many existing funeral monuments and crypts remain in use.

Royalty and high nobility often have one or more "traditional" sites of burial, generally monumental, often in a palatial chapel or cathedral.

In North America, private family cemeteries were common among wealthy landowners during the 18th and 19th centuries. Many prominent people were buried in private cemeteries on their respective properties, sometimes in lead-lined coffins. Many of these family cemeteries were not documented and were therefore lost to time and abandoned; their grave markers having long since been pilfered by vandals or covered by forest growth. Their locations are occasionally discovered during construction projects.

After interfaith marriage, issues might arise regarding burial. As different religious traditions prescribe different locations for burial, a single burial location for a married couple is not always self-evident.

=== Marking the location of the burial ===
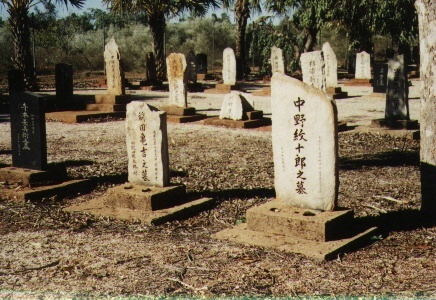
Kanji inscriptions engraved on headstones in the Japanese Cemetery in Broome, Western Australia

Most modern cultures mark the location of the body with a headstone. This serves two purposes. First, the grave will not accidentally be exhumed. Second, headstones often contain information or tributes to deceased. This is a form of remembrance for loved ones; it can also be viewed as a form of immortality, especially in cases of famous people's graves. Such monumental inscriptions may subsequently be useful to genealogists and family historians.

In many cultures graves will be grouped, so the monuments make up a necropolis, a "city of the dead" paralleling the community of the living.

==== Unmarked grave ====
In many cultures graves are marked with durable markers, or monuments, intended to help remind people of the buried person. An unmarked grave is a grave with no such memorial marker.

==== Anonymous burial ====
Another sort of unmarked grave is a burial site with an anonymous marker, such as a simple cross; boots, rifle and helmet; a sword and shield; a cairn of stones; or even a monument. This may occur when identification of the deceased is impossible. Although many unidentified deceased are buried in potter's fields, some are memorialized, especially in smaller communities or in the case of deaths publicized by local media. Anonymous burials also happen in poorer or disadvantaged populations' communities in countries such as South Africa, where in the past the non-white population was simply too poor to afford headstones. At the cemetery in the small rural town of Harding, KwaZulu-Natal, many grave sites have no identification and just have a border of stones which mark out the dimensions of the grave site itself.

Many countries have buried an unidentified soldier (or other member of the military) in a prominent location as a form of respect for all unidentified war dead. The UK memorializes 'the Unknown Warrior' in Westminster Abbey; France's is buried underneath the Arc de Triomphe; Italy's is buried within the Monumento al Milite Ignoto in Rome; Canada's is buried at the National War Memorial in Ottawa; Australia's is located at the Australian War Memorial in Canberra; New Zealand's is located in Wellington; Russia's memorial is in Alexander Garden in Moscow, and the U.S.'s is located at Arlington National Cemetery.

Many cultures practice anonymous burial as a norm, not an exception. For instance, in 2002 a survey for the Federal Guild of German Stonemasons found that, depending on the location within Germany, from 0% to 43% of burials were anonymous. According to Christian Century magazine, the perspective of the Roman Catholic Church is that anonymous burials reflect a dwindling belief in God. Others claim that this trend is mainly driven by secularism and the high costs of traditional burials.

==== Secret burial ====
In rare cases, a known person may be buried without identification, perhaps to avoid desecration of the corpse, grave robbing, or vandalism of the burial site. This may be particularly the case with infamous or notorious figures. In other cases, it may be to prevent the grave from becoming a tourist attraction or a destination of pilgrimage. Survivors may cause the deceased to be buried in a secret location or other unpublished place, or in a grave with a false name (or no name at all) on the marker.

Following Walt Disney's cremation, his ashes were buried in a secret location in Forest Lawn Memorial Park Cemetery, California. Some burial sites at Forest Lawn, such as those of Humphrey Bogart, Mary Pickford and Michael Jackson, are secluded in private gated gardens or mausoleums with no public access. A number of tombs are also kept from the public eye. Forest Lawn's Court of Honor indicates that some of its crypts have plots which are reserved for individuals who may be "voted in" as "Immortals"; no amount of money can purchase a place. Photographs taken at Forest Lawn are not permitted to be published, and their information office usually refuses to reveal exactly where the remains of famous people are buried.

==== Multiple bodies per grave ====
Some couples or groups of people (such as a married couple or other family members) may wish to be buried in the same plot. In some cases, the coffins (or urns) may simply be buried side by side. In others, one casket may be interred above another. If this is planned for in advance, the first casket may be buried more deeply than is the usual practice so that the second casket may be placed over it without disturbing the first. In many states in Australia all graves are designated two or three depth (depending on the water table) for multiple burials, at the discretion of the burial rights holder, with each new interment atop the previous coffin separated by a thin layer of earth. As such all graves are dug to greater depth for the initial burial than the traditional six feet to facilitate this practice.

Mass burial is the practice of burying multiple bodies in one location. Civilizations attempting genocide often employ mass burial for victims. However, mass burial may in many cases be the only practical means of dealing with an overwhelming number of human remains, such as those resulting from a natural disaster, an act of terrorism, an epidemic, or an accident. This practice has become less common in the developed world with the advent of genetic testing, but even in the 21st century remains which are unidentifiable by current methods may be buried in a mass grave.

Individuals who are buried at the expense of the local authorities and buried in potter's fields may be buried in mass graves. Wolfgang Amadeus Mozart was once believed to have been buried in such a manner, but today it is known that such burials were never allowed in Mozart's Vienna, whose magistrates refused to agree to the burial regulations decreed by Joseph II. In some cases, the remains of unidentified individuals have been buried in mass graves in potter's fields, making exhumation and future identification troublesome for law enforcement.

Naval ships sunk in combat are also considered mass graves by many countries. For example, U.S. Navy policy declares such wrecks a mass grave (such as the USS Arizona Memorial) and forbids the recovery of remains. In lieu of recovery, divers or submersibles may leave a plaque dedicated to the memory of the ship or boat and its crew, and family members are invited to attend the ceremony.

Sites of large former battlefields may also contain one or more mass graves. Douaumont ossuary is one such mass grave, and it contains the remains of 130,000 soldiers from both sides of the Battle of Verdun.

Catacombs also constitute a form of mass grave. Some catacombs, for example those in Rome, were designated as a communal burial place. Some, such as the catacombs of Paris, only became a mass grave when individual burials were relocated from cemeteries marked for demolition.

Judaism does not generally allow multiple bodies in a grave. An exception to this is a grave in the military cemetery in Jerusalem, where there is a kever achim (Hebrew: "grave of brothers") where two soldiers were killed together in a tank and are buried in one grave. As the bodies were so fused together with the metal of the tank that they could not be separately identified, they were buried in one grave (along with parts of the tank).

=== Live burial ===
Sometimes people are buried alive. Having no way of escaping interment, they die in place, typically by asphyxiation, dehydration, starvation, or exposure to climate. People may come to be buried alive in a number of different ways;

- Intentional: buried alive as a method of execution or murder, called immurement when the person is entombed within walls. In ancient Rome, Vestal Virgins who broke their vows were punished in this way.
- Accidental: A person or group of people in a cave, mine, or other underground area may be sealed underground by an earthquake, cave in, avalanche or other natural disaster or accident.
- Inadvertent: People have been buried alive because they were mistakenly pronounced dead by a coroner or other official.

Edgar Allan Poe wrote a number of stories and poems about premature burial, including a story called "The Premature Burial". These works inspired a widespread popular fear of this appalling but unlikely event. Various expedients have been devised to prevent it, including burying telephones or sensors in graves.

=== Burial at crossroads ===
Historically, crossroad graves were used to dispose of the bodies of executed criminals and suicides. They were located at a crossroads, often on a parish border. In Great Britain, until the Burial of Suicides Act 1823, suicides were generally not allowed a burial in consecrated ground, and the burial far outside the community, sometimes with a stake through their heart, was seen as a way to keep their spirits from haunting the area. Crossroads form a crude cross shape and this may have given rise to the belief that these spots were selected as burying-places which were next best to consecrated ground. The shape was seen as a powerful symbol against all kinds of unwelcome powers. Another possible explanation is that the ancient Teutonic (Germanic) ethnic groups often built their altars at a crossroads, and since human sacrifices, especially of criminals, formed part of ritual, these spots came to be regarded as execution grounds. Hence after the introduction of Christianity, criminals and suicides were buried at the crossroads during the night, to assimilate as far as possible their funeral with that of the pagans. An example of a crossroad execution-ground was the famous Tyburn in London, which stood on the spot where the Roman road to Edgware and beyond met the Roman road heading west out of London.

Superstition also played a part in the selection of crossroads in the burial of suicides. Folk belief often held such individuals could rise as some form of undead (such as a vampire) and burying them at crossroads would inhibit their ability to find and wreak havoc on their living relations and former associates.

Some crossroad graves have had their names linked to older graves in the landscape, such as bronze age and older tumuli.

== Burial of animals ==
=== By humans ===
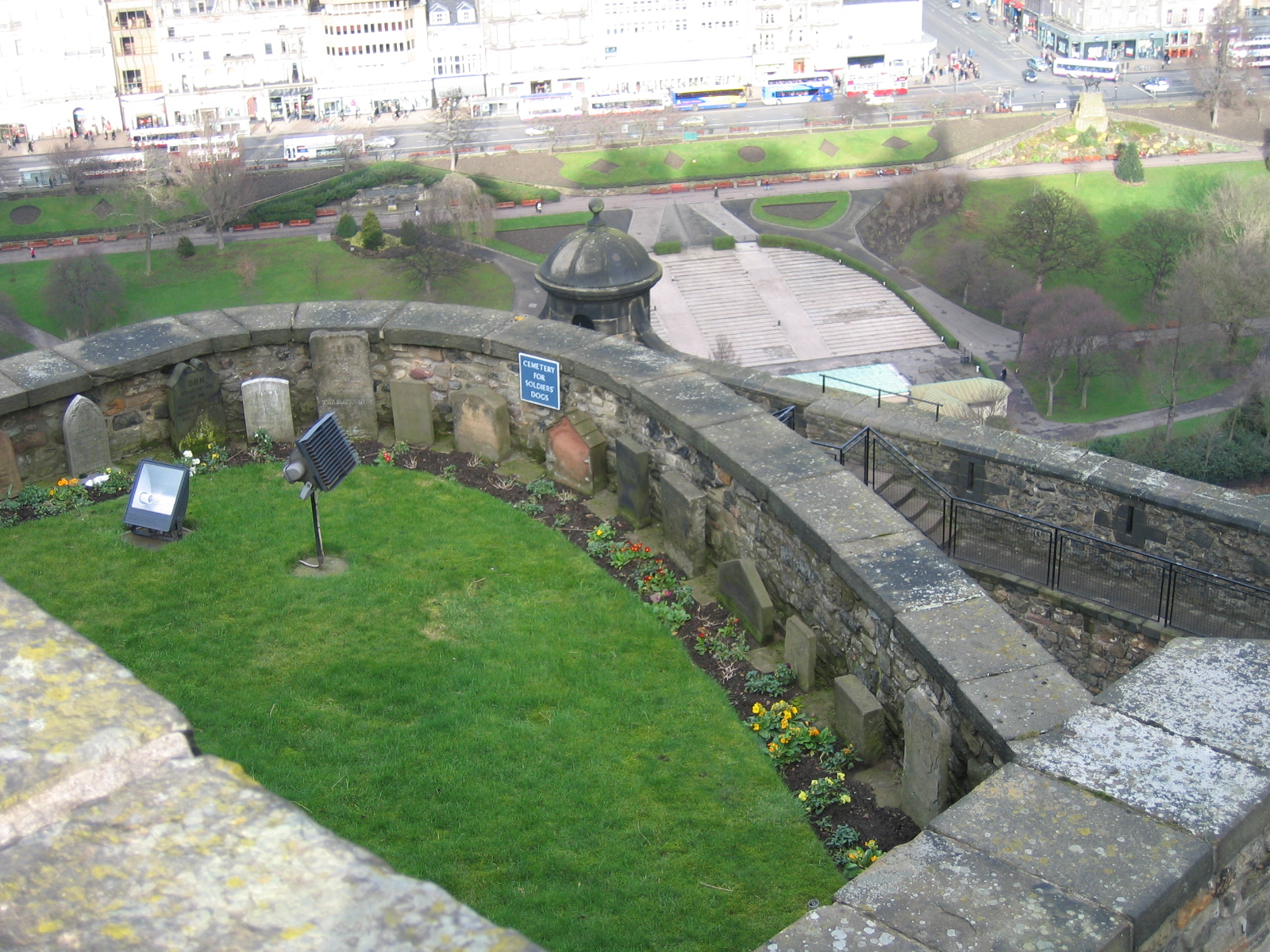
Soldiers' dog cemetery at Edinburgh Castle

In addition to burying human remains, many human cultures also regularly bury animal remains.

Pets and other animals of emotional significance are often ceremonially buried. Most families bury deceased pets on their own properties, mainly in a yard, with a shoe box or any other type of container served as a coffin. The ancient Egyptians are known to have mummified and buried cats, which they considered deities.

=== By other animals ===
Humans are not always the only species to bury their dead. Chimpanzees and elephants are known to throw leaves and branches over fallen members of their family groups. In one instance, an elephant which trampled a human mother and child buried its victims under a pile of leaves before disappearing into the bushes. In 2013, a viral video caught a dog burying a dead puppy by pushing sand with its own nose. It is presumed, however, that since dogs retain the instinct to bury food, this is what is being depicted in the video. In social insects, ants and termites also bury their dead nestmates depending on the properties of the corpse and the social context. Laboratory rats had been observed using bedding material to bury dead conspecifics placed in their test chamber.

== Exhumation ==
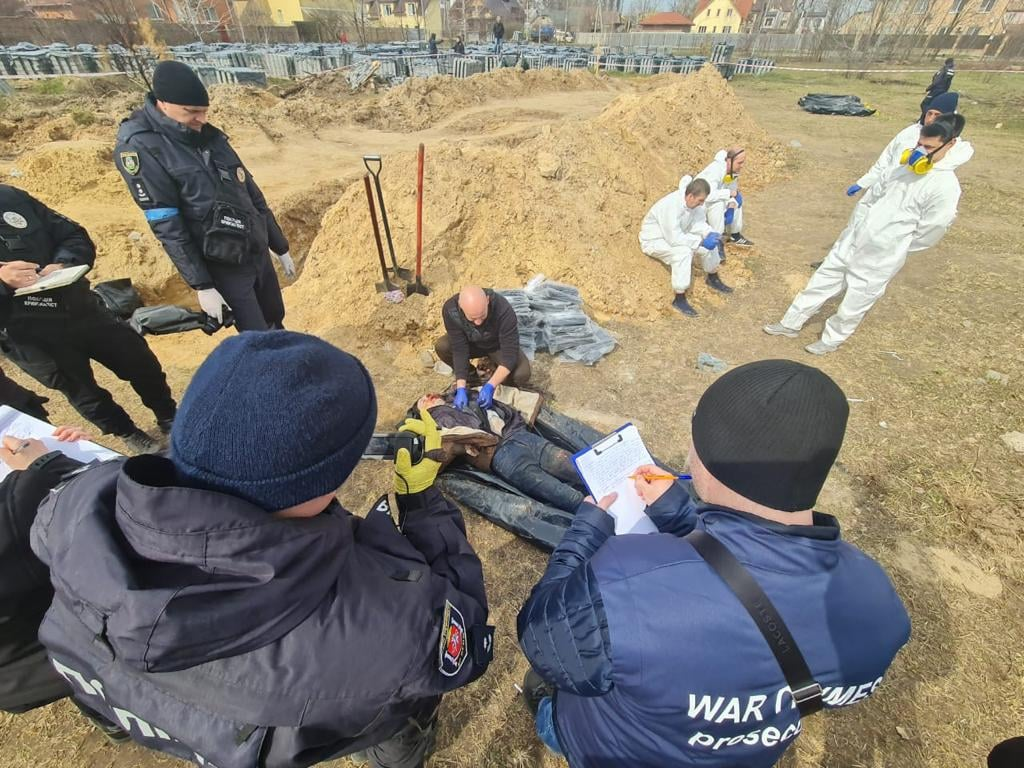
Exhumation of those killed in Bucha massacre in March 2022

Exhumation, or disinterment, is the act of digging something up, especially a corpse. This is most often done to relocate a body to a different burial spot; families may make this decision to locate the deceased in a more pertinent or convenient place. In shared family burial sites (e.g. a married couple), if the previously deceased person has been buried for an insufficient period of time, the second body may be buried elsewhere until it is safe to relocate it to the shared grave.

Exhumation of human remains occur for a number of other reasons, including body identification or as part of a criminal investigation. If an individual dies in suspicious circumstances, police may request exhumation to determine the cause of death. Exhumations may also occur via grave robbery or as an act of desecration. In rare, historical cases (e.g. Pope Formosus or Oliver Cromwell), a body may be exhumed for posthumous execution, dissection, or gibbeting. Notable individuals may be exhumed to answer historical questions. Exhumation by archaeologists enables the study of remains, as with many ancient Egyptian mummies that have been put on public display.

In most jurisdictions, a legal exhumation usually requires a court order or permission by the next of kin of the deceased. U.S. law allows disinterment "only for the most compelling of reasons" and with the permission of close relatives and the cemetery official. Also in many countries, permits are required by some governing agency to legally conduct a disinterment.

In folklore and mythology, exhumation has also been frequently associated with the performance of rites to banish undead manifestations. A historical example is the 1892 Mercy Brown vampire incident of Rhode Island.

=== Changing burial location ===
Remains may be exhumed for reinterment at a more appropriate location for various reasons.

- The passing of time may mean political situations change and a burial can take place in different circumstances. Roger Casement was executed at Pentonville Prison in London on 3 August 1916 and buried in the prison grounds but his body was exhumed and given a state funeral in Dublin on 1 March 1965.
- Deceased individuals who were either not identified or misidentified at the time of burial may be reburied if survivors so wish. For example, when the remains of MIA soldiers are discovered, or the case of Nicholas II of Russia and his family, who were exhumed from unmarked graves near Yekaterinburg to be reinterred in the Peter and Paul Fortress in St. Petersburg.
- Cemeteries sometimes have a limited number of plots in which to bury the dead. Once all plots are full, older remains may be moved to an ossuary to accommodate more bodies, in accordance with burial contracts, religious and local burial laws. In Hong Kong where real estate is at a premium, burials in government-run cemeteries are disinterred after six years under exhumation order. Remains are either collected privately for cremation or reburied in an urn or niche. Unclaimed burials are exhumed and cremated by the government. Permanent burial in privately run cemeteries is allowed. In Singapore, cremation is preferred by most Singaporeans because burials in Singapore is limited to 15 years. After 15 years, Singaporean graves will be exhumed and the remains will either be cremated or re-interred.
- Remains may be exhumed and reburied en masse when a cemetery is relocated, once local planning and religious requirements are met. It also enables construction agencies to clear the way for new constructions. One example of this is cemeteries in Chicago next to O'Hare International Airport to expand the runways. The remains of the Venerable or the Blessed are sometimes exhumed to ensure their bodies lie in their correctly marked graves, as their gravesites usually become places for devotees to gather, and also to collect relics. The bodies may also be transferred to a more dignified place. It also serves the purpose to see if they are supernaturally Incorrupt. An incorrupt corpse is no longer considered miraculous, but it is a characteristic of several known saints. Exhumation is no longer a requirement in the beatification process, but still may be carried out.
- For ethical and cultural reasons, repatriation and reburial of human remains may be carried out when museums and academic institutions return remains to their place of origin.

=== Cultural aspects of exhumation ===
Frequently, cultures have different sets of exhumation taboos. Occasionally these differences result in conflict, especially in cases where a culture with more lenient exhumation rules wishes to operate on the territory of a different culture. For example, U.S. construction companies have run into conflict with Native American groups that have wanted to preserve their burial grounds from disturbance.

In Southern Chinese culture, graves are opened after a period of years. The bones are removed, cleaned, dried, and placed in a ceramic pot for reburial (in Taiwan), or in a smaller coffin and to be reburied in another location (in Vietnam). The practice is called jiǎngǔ(撿骨) in Taiwan, or Bốc mộ(卜墓) in Vietnam "digging up bones" and is an important ritual in the posthumous "care" of children for their deceased parents and ancestors.

Jewish law forbids the exhumation of a corpse.

The majority of Muslim jurors maintain that an individual buried in a mosque must be exhumed and that offering prayers in such a mosque renders the prayer invalid. Jurists, however, hold that mosques built around already existing graves are to be demolished.

In England and Wales once the top of a coffin has been lowered below ground level during a burial, raising the coffin again, for any reason, is considered exhumation regardless of the cause. Even if further work is necessary to properly fit the casket into the grave without further, the Home Office must to be notified and a full investigation undertaken. Therefore, grave diggers in England and Wales are particularly careful to ensure that grave sites are dug with plenty of room for the coffin to pass.

== Reinterment ==
Reinterment refers to the reburial of a corpse.

== Secondary burial ==
Secondary burial is a burial, cremation, or inhumation that is dug into a pre-existing barrow or grave any time after its initial construction. It is often associated with the belief that there is a liminal phase between the time that a person dies and finally decays.

== Alternatives to burial ==
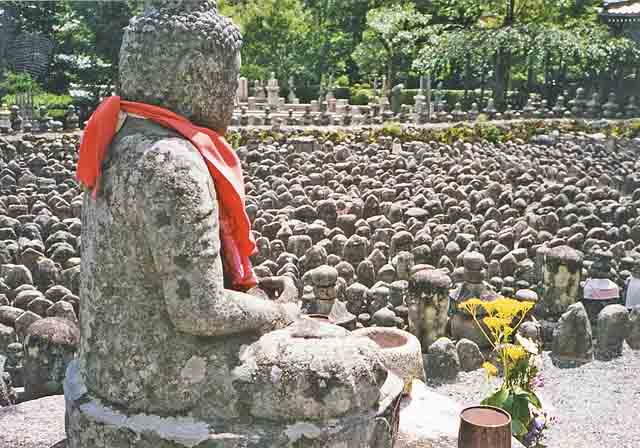
Adashino Nembutsuji in Kyoto, Japan, stands on a site where Japanese people once abandoned the bodies of the dead without burial.

Alternatives to burial variously show respect for the dead, accelerate decomposition and disposal, or prolong display of the remains.

- Burial at sea is the practice of depositing the body or scattering its ashes in an ocean or other large body of water instead of soil. The body may be disposed in a coffin, or without one.
- Funerary cannibalism is the practice of eating the remains. This may be done for many reasons: for example to partake of their strength, to spiritually "close the circle" by reabsorbing their life into the family or clan, to annihilate an enemy, or due to pathological mental conditions. The Yanomami have the practice of cremating the remains and then eating the ashes with banana paste.
- Cremation is the incineration of the remains. This practice is common amongst Hindus and is becoming increasingly common in other cultures as well. If a family member wishes, the ashes can now be turned into a gem, similar to creating synthetic diamonds.
- Whether cryonics constitutes a method of interment, rather than a form of medical treatment, remains under debate. See also information-theoretic death and clinical death.
- Excarnation is the practice of removing the flesh from the corpse without interment. The Zoroastrians have traditionally left their dead on Towers of Silence, where the flesh of the corpses is left to be devoured by vultures and other carrion-eating birds. Alternatively, it can also mean butchering the corpse by hand to remove the flesh (also referred to as "defleshing").
- Gibbeting was the semi-ancient practice of publicly displaying remains of criminals.
- Hanging coffins are coffins placed on cliffs, found in various locations, including China and the Philippines.
- Ossuaries were used for interring human skeletal remains by Second Temple Jews and early Christians.
- Promession is a method of freeze drying human remains before burial to increase the rate of decomposition.
- Resomation accelerates disposal through the process of alkaline hydrolysis.
- Sky burial places the body on a mountaintop, where it decomposes in the elements or is scavenged by carrion eaters, particularly vultures.

=== Adapting traditions ===
==== Burial ====
As the human population progresses, cultures and traditions change with it. Evolution is generally slow, sometimes more rapid. South Korea's funeral arrangements have drastically changed in the course of only two decades according to Chang-Won Park. Around the 1980s at home funeral ceremonies were the general norm, straying away from anywhere that was not a family home. Dying close to home, with friends and family, was considered a 'good death', while dying away from home was considered a 'bad death'. This gradually changed as the upper and middle class started holding funerals in the mortuaries of hospitals. This posed an issue for hospitals because of the rapid increase in funerals being held and maxing occupancy. This quickly resolved when a law was passed to allow the civilian population holding funerals in the mortuaries of hospitals. The lower class quickly followed suit, copying the newly set traditions of the upper classes. With this change, cremation also practice more as an alternative to traditional burials. Cremation was first introduced by Buddhism, and was quickly banned in 1470. It was not until the Japanese colonization period that cremation was reintroduced in 1945 and later on lifted the ban. It took until 1998 for cremation to rapidly grow in popularity.

==== Funeral ceremonies ====
According to Margaret Holloway, funerals are believed to be driven by the consumer's choice, personalisation, secularization, and stories that place individual traditional meta-narratives. It has been studied that funeral homes in the UK are most concerned with comforting the grieving, rather than focusing on the departed. This study found that modern day funerals focus on the psycho-social-spiritual event. Modern day funerals also help the transition of the recently passed transitioning to the social status of 'the deceased'. The article found that funeral homes do not adhere to traditional religious beliefs, but do follow religious traditions.

== See also ==
- Bed burial
- Burial Act 1857 – UK law about exhumation
- Burial mound
- Corpse road
- Museum of Funeral Customs
- State funeral
- Superburial
- Thanatology
- Tower of Silence
