= Archaeology of religion and ritual =

The archaeology of religion and ritual is a growing field of study within archaeology that applies ideas from religious studies, theory and methods, anthropological theory, and archaeological and historical methods and theories to the study of religion and ritual in past human societies from a material perspective.

== Definitions ==
Religion may be defined as "a set of beliefs concerning the cause, nature, and purpose of the universe, especially when considered as the creation of a superhuman agency or agencies, usually involving devotional and ritual observances, and often containing a moral code governing the conduct of human affairs," whereas ritual is "an established or prescribed procedure for a religious or other rite." Archaeologists may study the material traces of religious ritual (for example, the ritual destruction of ceramic vessels during the Aztec New Fire ceremony) or the material correlates of religion as a totalized worldview (for example, Elizabeth Kyder-Reid's study of the Southern Redemptorists’ reconfiguration of landscape and artifacts to reflect their ideals of community and poverty in material form).

As in religious studies and the Anthropology of religion, many archaeologists differentiate between "world religions," and "traditional" or "indigenous religions." "World religions" are defined by Bowie (2000: 26) as:

1. Based on written scriptures.
2. Has a notion of salvation, often from outside.
3. Universal, or potentially universal.
4. Can subsume or supplant primal religions.
5. Often forms a separate sphere of activity.

while indigenous religions are defined as:

1. Oral, or if literate, lacks written/formal scriptures and creeds.
2. ‘This worldly’.
3. Confined to a single language or ethnic group.
4. Form basis from which world religions have developed.
5. Religious and social life are inseparable.

However, Timothy Insoll (2004: 9) has argued that these categorizations arise from a much-critiqued neo-evolutionary perspective. Strict dichotomies of religious forms may also contribute to skewing research toward state religions, leaving household religious practice, and the relationships between these, under-investigated (a trend noted by Elson and Smith, 2001). Insoll (2004:9) argues that archaeologists may contribute to blurring the boundaries of world and indigenous religions.

The archaeology of religion also incorporates related anthropological or religious concepts and terms such as magic, tradition, symbolism, and the sacred.

== Theory ==
=== Anthropology of religion ===
Theory within the archaeology of religion borrows heavily from the Anthropology of religion, which encompasses a broad range of perspectives. These include: Émile Durkheim's functionalist understanding of religion as serving to separate the sacred and the profane; Karl Marx's idea of religion as "the opium of the masses" or a false consciousness, Clifford Geertz's loose definition of religion as a "system of symbols" that orders the world, Victor Turner's work on ritual, including rites of passage and liminality, Max Weber's religious types and thoughts on the relationship between economics and religion; Claude Lévi-Strauss’ structuralist understandings of totemism and myth; and Mary Douglas’ idea of the division of "purity and danger".

=== Religion, identity, and practice ===
Archaeological studies of religion increasingly recognize religion as an organizing principle in social life, rather than as a separate sphere of activity. They include religion as an axis of identity that structures social life and personal experience. Therefore, entire artifact assemblages (rather than specifically "religious" artifacts, such as rosary beads) can be interpreted according to the ways that they simultaneously create, display, and constrain notions of self according to religious ideas. For example, John Chenoweth (2009) interpreted ceramic assemblages and burials according to Quaker ideals of plainness and modesty.

Because social identity is both imposed and negotiated through social practice, including material practice, archaeologies of religion increasingly incorporate practice-based theory. Building upon Anthony Giddens’ idea of structuration and Pierre Bourdieu's ideas of both practice and cultural capital, theories of material practice posit that people use material goods to negotiate their places within social structures. Examples of the archaeological interpretation of religion and ritual as part of social negotiation, transformation or reinforcement include Chenoweth's work on Quaker religious practice, Kyder-Reid's work on the Southern Redemptorists, and Timothy Pauketat's work on feasting in Cahokia (Pauketat et al., 2002).

=== Religion, power, and inequality ===
Because religion and political power are often intertwined particularly in early states, the archaeology of religion may also engage theories of power and inequality. John Janusek's study of Tiwanaku religion, for example, explored the ways that religion served to integrate societies within the Andean state. Colonial regimes frequently justified expansion through a commitment to religious conversion; archaeologies of coloniality may therefore intersect with the archaeology of religion. James Delle's 2001 article on missions and landscape in Jamaica and Barbara Voss’ work on missions, sexuality and empire demonstrate how religion has intersected with colonial regimes.

=== Historical method and theory ===
Historical archaeologists have made major contributions to the understanding of the religion and ritual of peoples who have remained underrepresented (or misrepresented) in the historical record, such as colonized peoples, indigenous peoples, and enslaved peoples. Mandatory religious conversion was common in many colonial situations (e.g. the Spanish colonization of the Americas), which led to syncretic religious practice, rejection or resistance to new religions, covert practice of indigenous religions, and/or misunderstandings and misinterpretations of both indigenous and colonizer religions (Hanks 2010 Klor de Alva 1982, Wernke 2007).

This research combines archaeological and anthropological method and theory with historical method and theory. In addition to recovering, recording, and analyzing material culture, historical archaeologists use archives, oral histories, ethnohistorical accounts. Researchers read texts critically, emphasizing the historical context of the documents (especially regarding underrepresented peoples whose voices may be distorted or missing) in order to better understand religious practices that may have been discouraged or even severely punished. Combined archaeological, historical, and anthropological data sets may contradict each other, or the material record may illuminate the details of covert or syncretic religious practice, as well as resistance to dominant religious forms. For example, our understanding of the religious practice of enslaved peoples in the United States (e.g. Leone and Frye 2001, Fennell 2007) has increased dramatically thanks to research in historical archaeology.

== Material correlates ==
Because archaeology studies human history through objects, buildings, bodies, and spaces, archaeologists must engage theories that connect anthropological and sociological theories of religion to material culture and landscapes. Theories of materiality and landscape serve to connect human activities, experiences, and behaviors to social practices, including religion. Theories of embodiment also serve to interpret human remains as they relate to religion and ritual.

The archaeology of religion makes use of the same material evidence as other branches of archaeology, but certain artifact classes are particularly emphasized in studying religion and ritual in the past:

- Human remains and burial assemblages can offer many clues to religious and ritual activity. Human remains themselves are used in all branches of archaeology for information on sex, age, occupation, and disease. Methods of interment (including burial position, cremation, burial location, primary and secondary burials, etc.) contribute to understanding changing religious practice, as well as social difference within groups (e.g. Lohmann 2005). Total burial contexts, i.e., the setting, artifacts, ecofacts, and human remains themselves, may provide evidence of religious beliefs about death and the afterworld.
- Religious buildings, such as temple complexes, kivas, and missions, are often used to examine communal religious and ritual activity (e.g. Barnes 1995, Graham 1998, Reid et al. 1997 ). Part of archaeoastronomy is the investigation of how buildings are aligned to astral bodies and events, such as solstices, which often coincide with religious or ritual activities. Archaeological examinations of religious buildings can reveal unequal access to religious knowledge and ritual. Religious buildings frequently contain religious iconography that provides insight into the symbolic dimensions of religious life.
- Within landscape archaeology, sacred landscapes are an increasingly important focus of study (e.g. Clendinnen 1980). Landscapes are imbued with sacred meaning throughout the world; aboriginal Australian songlines, and the related belief that mythical events are marked on the landscape, are one example. Human modifications to landscapes, such as Kyder-Reid's study of the Redemptorists’ modifications of their estate to emphasize communality, may point to the enactment of religious views.
- Religious iconography, symbols, ethnographic texts and ethnographic analogy are important tools that archaeologists use to compare with the material record to examine religions in the past (e.g. Clendinnen 1980, Elson and Smith 2001). Though texts are not direct "windows to the past," particularly for societies with few or no written records, they are valuable lines of evidence that may be contradicted or supported by the material record.
- Common artifact classes such as ceramics have been increasingly reinterpreted within a religious framework. According to the idea of religion as a form of social practice and a total worldview, any artifact may potentially be used to embody religious ideas and ideals in material form. Patterns of artifact and ecofact use within ritual contexts may expose preferences or sacred meanings of certain materials; the ritual use of pine among the ancient Maya is one example (Morehart, Lentz, and Prufer 2005).

== Examples of research by area ==
=== Africa ===
- Evolving religious structure in Egypt (Baines 1987)
- Ritual and political process in Tanzania (Hakansson 1998)
- Tswana religion and Christianity in Botswana and South Africa (Reid et al. 1997)

=== Americas ===
- Contemporary Maya shrines (Brown 2004)
- Landscape and Yucatec Maya religious practice (Clendinnen 1980)
- Christian missions in the Americas (Graham 1998)
- Religion and the State in the Andes (Janusek 2006)
- Religious architecture and religious transformation in colonial Peru (Wernke 2007)
- Early American slavery and African American religion (Leone and Frye 2001), Fennell (2007)

=== Asia ===
- Buddhism in India, Sri Lanka, and Southeast Asia (Barnes 1995)
- Early Hinduism in Rajasthan (Hooja 2004)

=== Europe ===
- Christianity and Anglo-Saxon burial practices (Crawford 2004)
- Religion in Minoan Crete (Herva 2006)
- Women and medieval burials (Gilchrist 2008)

=== Australia/South Pacific ===
- Burials and religious practice in Papua New Guinea (Lohmann 2005)
- Dreaming cosmology and Australian seascapes (McNiven 2003)

== Modern debates ==
=== Modern religious use of archaeological sites ===
Contemporary religious groups often claim archaeological sites as part of their heritage, and make use of archaeological sites and artifacts in their religious practice (e.g. Wallis 2003). These practices and religious interpretations of sites may clash with archaeological interpretations, leading to disputes about heritage, preservation, use of sites, and the "ownership" of history (Bender 1999).

=== Biblical archaeology ===
Biblical archaeology is a field of archaeology that seeks to correlate events in the Bible with concrete archaeological sites and artifacts (Meyers 1984, Richardson 1916).

== See also ==
- Anthropology of religion – Study of religion in relation to other social institutions
- Landscape Archaeology – Sub-discipline of archaeology and archaeological theory
- Household Archaeology
- Poles in mythology – Stake or post used in ritual practice
- Superburial – Area of dense burial activity
