= Household archaeology =

Household archaeology has a long history of anthropological inquiry. Archaeological investigations of the household serve as a microcosm for the greater social universe. The household serves as a space for socialization processes. Household archaeology focuses on the household as a social unit, and involves research on the household's dwelling and other related architecture, material culture, features, and larger sociopolitical organizations that are associated with a specific culture. Household social relationships have been associated as serving as an "atom" for society. Therefore, household studied effectively convey information pertaining to flexible economic and ecological conditions Household activity encompasses spheres of activity related to function and how people act. Household archaeology redefines the notion of the household and the domestic by challenging notions of what households are, how they operate and the social implications of such analysis. The material culture provides information about such activities. Households are families, domestic groups, and co-habitations. Households function in a variety of fashions.

== History of Theoretical Background ==
Household archaeology involves investigations of household activities. It encompasses social formation processes, family or co-residential organization and the material culture associated with such activities. Scholarly inquiry into household studies began in the 1960s with research emphasis upon a micro-scale analysis of social groups. Households are commonly referred to as the most basic social unit. Households operate within social and economic processes aimed to structure general conditions of social life. "Household" and "family" are social phenomena. According to Bender, these constructions are "logically distinct and, under certain circumstances, vary independently of each other." The household has three elements: the social (demographic), the material (possessions and dwellings) and the behavioral (activities). Household membership employs a variety of strategies and behaviors. Household archaeology is concerned with the material culture remaining from basic activity patterns as a result of human behavior.

== Archaeological implications ==
The material record thoroughly represents the intimate spaces of everyday life. It challenges how to formulate questions about everyday experiences. How people construct and interact with the world around them provide material evidence of a specific worldview. The household consists of the social (demographic and relationships of its members), the material aspect (dwelling and structures), and the behavioral aspect (activities it performs). A household can be considered as “a corporate body organized by reference to shared practices and [a] common estate.” Religion, rituals and social activities are often organized at the household level and reinforced by habitual actions through time. Human agency also affects conceptions of household ideology. Scientific inquiry within household archaeology is a balance between theoretical arguments and empirical data to support or refute the evidence. Household archaeology is a platform for examining inequality. Whether gender, social or material, inequality exists in archaeological analysis.

== General topics ==
=== Defining the household ===
The term "family" today implies a kinship tie, while domestic groups are associated with function and co-residence simply implies shared dwelling space. A household can be any of these. Household function is concerned with production, consumption, reproduction and socialization. These functions can be interpreted archaeologically. Domestic chores have historically been associated with a gendered division of labor and tasks associated with maintaining the household chores and child rearing.

=== Gender ===
Historically, a presumed gendered binary exists associating men with the “public” sphere and women with the “private” sphere. This often is explained by the historical division of labor in hunter-gatherer societies where men were responsible for food procurement of large game and women were responsible for child-rearing and gathering plant food sources. Friedrich Engels argued that the sexual division of labor was an "outgrowth of nature" because men went to war, and hunted while women cared for the house and prepared food. This argument is unacceptable today. Women are engaged in productive, active work inside and outside the home all over the world. Anthropological inquiry into the sexual division of labor in the domestic domain began with Ester Boserup's work on women and economic development. A universally assumed Western division between the “domestic/house/private” space versus the “public/exterior male world” exists. This launched a structured division between gendered social worlds. Women have made a substantial contribution to subsistence activities and household production. The structured system of social relationships also implies an “idealized” gendered identity associated with a public vs. private dichotomy. Political actions and socioeconomic motivations aid male and female actions in domestic groups. The mother-child relationship is often associated with the nucleus of all family groups. Reproduction involves physical reproduction, child rearing and socialization. Households can be organized to collectively achieve these tasks. Gender themes resonate as a result of this action. Household studies of space and place often involve function and activity. Site layouts, and conceptions of households provide information about gender roles in the past.

=== Household space ===
The dwelling itself serves as a material, functional space. The house serves as a "privileged entity" for studying intimate spaces of inside space. Storage space can assess a socially constructed identity. This process allows groups to apply spatial and social meaning to control knowledge. Alternatively, discard behavior reflects how acquisition and use reflects patterns of daily life. Particular spaces within the dwelling itself are reserved to accomplish household tasks. For example, the kitchen is reserved for cooking and the bedroom is reserved for sleeping. However, not all cultures adhere to such traditions.

== Methodology ==
Multiple lines of evidence prove to be most useful in household archaeological studies. Human settlement patterns, site formation processes, and material culture help to organize household studies that bridge theoretical and methodological interpretations of archaeological assemblages. Botanical, Faunal assemblage, ceramic, privy, historical documents, art history, and refuse data provide information for methodological applications of household archaeology. Household Archaeology employs a dynamic interaction between theoretical and practical. Applications of “longue durée,” an Ethnohistory approach are suggested as a method for household anthropological Archaeology. Joyce employed such methods in examining the socialization processes for Aztec children. Household archaeology encompasses the space outside the dwelling itself. New scientific analysis allow households to be examined using new techniques such as soil chemistry, bone chemistry, and Paleoethnobotany. Uniquely preserved examples allow archaeologists to examine households carefully and devise new techniques for analysis.

== See also ==
- Landscape archaeology
- Anthropology of religion
- Gender archaeology
