= Death by Dying =

Dark comedy fiction podcast

- Format: Audio drama
- Country of origin: United States
- Language: English

Creative team
- Created by: Evan Gulock; Niko Gerentes

Publication
- Original release: 1 October 2018

Death by Dying is an audio drama created by Evan Gulock and Niko Gerentes. It is a member of the Fable & Folly network.

== Premise ==
Death by Dying is a dark comedy that follows the obituary column of the fictional small town Crestfall, Idaho.

== Critical reception ==
Death by Dying has been widely reviewed in audio drama spaces, and by Funeral Director Monthly, the monthly newsletter produced by the National Association of Funeral Directors. It has been downloaded more than one million times.

== Awards ==
Year	Organization	Award	Awardee	Ref
2019	Audio Verse Awards	Best New Audio Play Production	Death by Dying	
2019	Audio Verse Awards	Best Writing of a New Audio Play Production	Evan Gulock	
2019	Audio Verse Awards	Best Vocal Direction of a New Production	Niko Gerentes	
2019	Audio Verse Awards	Best Performance of a Leading Role in a New Audio Play Production	Evan Gulock	
2019	Audio Verse Awards	Best Performance of a Supporting Role in a New Audio Play Production	Hannah Smith	
2019	Audio Verse Awards	Best Environmental Sound Design in a New Production	Niko Gerentes	
