= Grave =

Burial location of a dead body

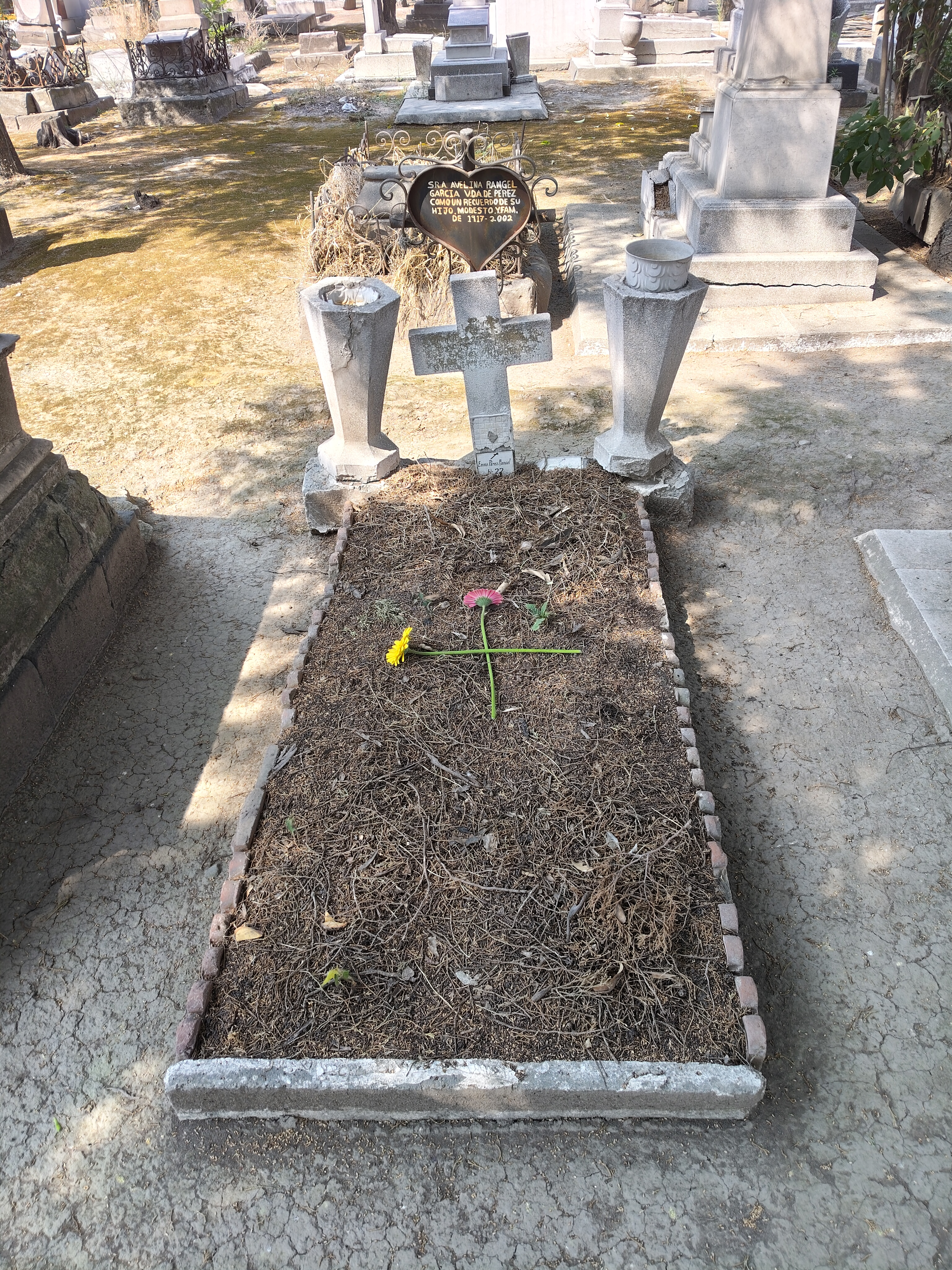
A grave inside Panteón Español, a 19th century cemetery in Mexico City

A grave is a location where a dead body (typically that of a human, although sometimes that of an animal) is buried or interred after a funeral. Graves are usually located in special areas set aside for the purpose of burial, such as graveyards or cemeteries.

In some religions, it is believed that the body must be burned or cremated for the soul to survive; in others, the complete decomposition of the body is considered to be important for the rest of the soul (see bereavement).

== Description ==
The formal use of a grave involves several steps with associated terminology.

Grave cut

The excavation that forms the grave. Excavations vary from a shallow scraping to removal of topsoil to a depth of 6 feet (1.8 m) or more where a vault or burial chamber is to be constructed. However, most modern graves in the United States are only 4 feet (1.2 m) deep as the casket is placed into a concrete box (see burial vault) to prevent a sinkhole, to ensure the grave is strong enough to be driven over, and to prevent floating in the instance of a flood.

Excavated soil

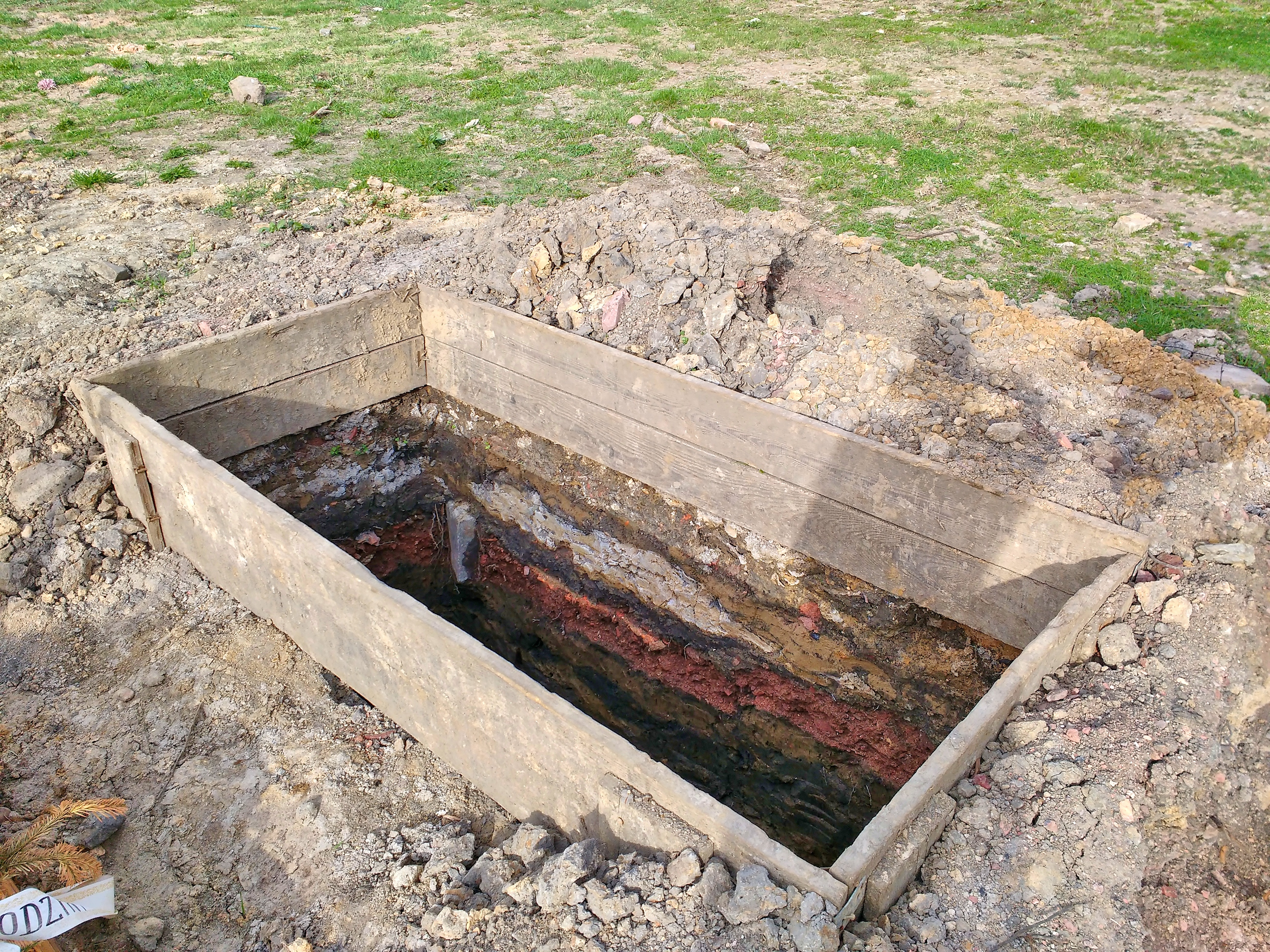
An excavated grave in Poland with its soil next to it awaiting to be closed

The material dug up when the grave is excavated. It is often piled up close to the grave for backfilling and then returned to the grave to cover it. As soil decompresses when excavated and space is occupied by the burial not all the volume of soil fits back in the hole, so often evidence is found of remaining soil. In cemeteries, this may end up as a thick layer of soil overlying the original ground surface.

Burial or interment

The body may be placed in a coffin or other container, in a wide range of positions, by itself or in a multiple burial, with or without personal possessions of the deceased.

Burial vault

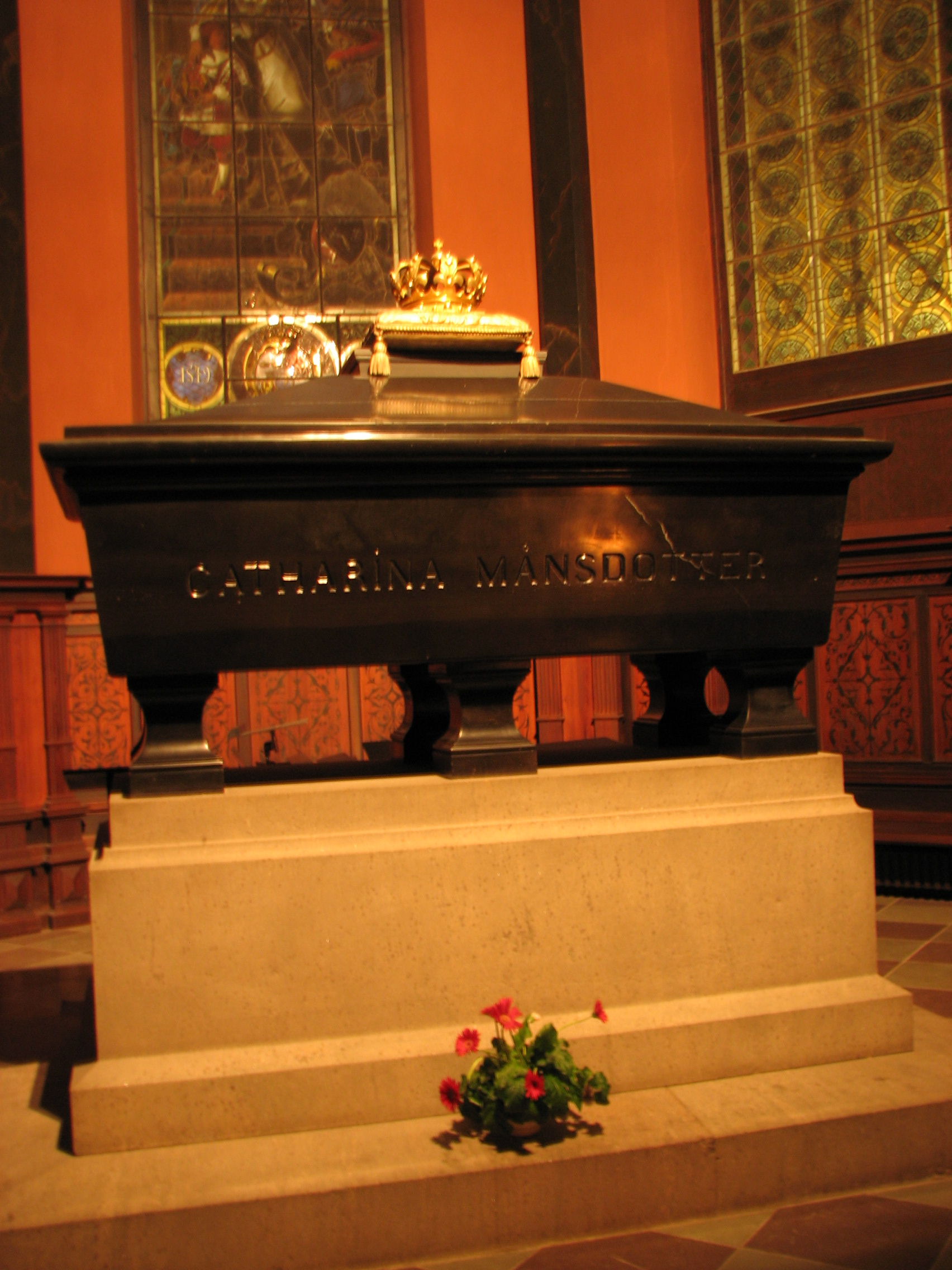
Burial vault of Catherine Månsdotter, the queen of Sweden, at the Turku Cathedral in Turku, Finland

A burial vault is a structure built within the grave to receive the body. It may be used to prevent crushing of the remains, allow for multiple burials such as a family vault, retrieval of remains for transfer to an ossuary, or because it forms a monument.

Grave backfill

The soil returned to the grave cut following burial. This material may contain artifacts derived from the original excavation and prior site use, deliberately placed goods or artifacts, or later material. The fill may be left level with the ground or mounded.

Monument or marker

Headstones are best known, but they can be supplemented by decorative edging, footstones, posts to support items, a solid covering or other options.

== Graveyards and cemeteries ==
Graveyards were usually established at the same time as the building of the relevant place of worship (which can date back to the 8th to 14th centuries) and were often used by those families who could not afford to be buried inside or beneath the place of worship itself.

Later, graveyards have been replaced by cemeteries.

== In language ==
- Turn in one's grave is an idiom to describe an extreme level of shock or an intense level of surprise and is expressed as the vicarious sentiment of a deceased person.

== See also ==
- Gravestone
- Stećak
- Bereavement in Judaism
- Burial at sea
- Cenotaph
- Christian burial
- Cremation
- Crypt
- Dolmen
- Funeral pyre
- Funerary art
- God's Acre
- Gravedigger
- Islamic funeral
- Mass grave
- Maqbara
- Mausoleum
- Monumental inscription
- Natural burial
- Necropolis
- Premature burial
- Pyramid
- Tomb
- Tophet
- Tumulus
- Turn in one's grave
- War grave
