= Burial vault =

Burial vault may refer to:

- Burial vault (enclosure), protective coffin enclosure
- Burial vault (tomb), underground tomb
