= Turn in one's grave =

Idiom

Turn in one's grave or roll in one's grave is an idiom to describe an extreme level of shock or an intense level of surprise and is expressed as the vicarious sentiment of a deceased person. This hyperbolic figure of speech is used to describe the upset, disgust, horror or anger of a deceased person if they were alive to hear of a certain news story, action or idea—especially a negative one. It is also said of the deceased founder(s) of governments or private institutions if their extant leadership goes against the founder(s)' principles or pursue(s) programs that the founder(s) would not have executed or envisioned. The phrase dates from the nineteenth century.

== Etymology ==
Literal use of the expression appeared in the Jewish rabbinic tradition in reference to Judah, the older brother of Joseph who accepted responsibility for Joseph's captivity in Egypt. As the Israelites wandered in the desert for their doubts, the tradition holds, the bones of Judah rolled around (Hebrew: מְגוּלְגָּלִין) in their coffin for his shame, until Moses prayed for mercy.

The earliest known example in English is a 4 November 1801 House of Commons speech by a Mr. Windham warning Britain against giving too much power to France during the preliminaries to peace following the revolutionary wars: "Thus have we done a thing altogether unknown in the history of this country; a thing which would have scared all former politicians; a thing, which, if our old Whig politicians were now to hear, they would turn in their graves."

One of the earliest uses is found in William Thackeray's 1849 work The History of Pendennis, where Mrs. Wapshot, upset by a man's advances on the widow of Mr. Pendennis whom the widow had "never liked," says it's "enough to make poor Mr. Pendennis turn in his grave." Another early use of the phrase is in historian James Bryce's 1888 work The American Commonwealth in which he said: "Jefferson might turn in his grave if he knew."

It has also been said that circa 1906, when George Bernard Shaw was invited to Henry Irving's funeral, he said "If I were at Westminster, Henry Irving would turn in his grave, just as Shakespeare would turn in his grave were Henry Irving at Stratford," implying that Irving's productions of Shakespeare would have made the actor as offensive to Shakespeare as Shaw had made himself offensive to Irving with the numerous critical reviews he had written of Irving's work. In 1902, the work Current Literature stated that "William Morris might well turn in his grave if he could see the uses to which his fine dreams of beautiful books have been put."

Where the sorry state of people's spelling/punctuation/literary skills come under criticism, the act is generally said to make "Shakespeare turn in his grave," as he is associated with high literary standards. One example of this is when a national newspaper opined that writing the word "cough" with an "F" would cause such a thing to occur.

== See also ==
- "Murrow Turning Over in His Grave"
- "Roll Over Beethoven"
