= National Association of Funeral Directors =

Organisation based in Solihull, England

The National Association of Funeral Directors is based in Solihull, England. Established in 1905, the National Association of Funeral Directors represents funeral directing businesses in the United Kingdom; including independent and family owned firms, co-operatives and major funeral groups.

The NAFD represents more than 4,100 UK funeral homes, as well as international firms and suppliers. As a trade association it provides advice, advocacy, and education services.

The NAFD is a founding member of the Deceased Management Advisory Group.

== Structure and Governance ==
The NAFD was incorporated as a Company Limited by Guarantee on 1 January 2019.

The NAFD comprises two wholly owned subsidiary companies; NAFD Ltd and NAFD Ventures Ltd. NAFD Ltd is the operating company of the NAFD, holding the main assets and liabilities and employing the NAFD's staff. It has a Governing Board and is supported by an executive committee.

NAFD Ventures Ltd is the company responsible for the biennial National Funeral Exhibition.

The NAFD Governing Board is chaired by an Independent Chair. The current independent chair is Jonathan Rees. Its role is to oversee Association governance, including the work of the committees, the Chief Executive and his team. The Governing Board comprises the four Officers of the Association, the CEO and co-opted volunteer members as required.

The NAFD Executive, a larger group drawn from the membership, focuses on wider strategic, policy-related and other industry and member matters.

== Education ==
The National Association of Funeral Directors offers training in the following aspects of funeral service:

- Funeral Service Awareness Training
- Level 4 NAFD Higher Level Funeral Directing Programme
- Certificate in Funeral Arranging and Administration
- Frontline Funeral Operative Training
- NAFD DipFD Direct Entry Route

The NAFD also hosts an Annual Summer School at Durham University.

== Advocacy ==
The NAFD regularly contributes to government consultations on behalf of its members.

Between 2018 and 2021 it contributed numerous times to the Competition and Markets Authority market investigation into the funerals market.

== National Funeral Exhibition ==
The National Funeral Exhibition is wholly owned by the National Association of Funeral Directors. The event is held at Stoneleigh Park in Warwickshire every other year and the next event takes place in June 2024.

== Press coverage ==
The NAFD regularly appears in the national media as a voice for the funeral profession and as a contributor to programmes discussing funeral and bereavement issues. During the pandemic, the NAFD campaigned through the media for the needs of bereaved people who were restricted from attending funerals, and for funeral directors who, as frontline workers, needed access to PPE, vaccines and testing.

Media coverage includes

In June 2014 NAFD spokesman Adam Heath appeared on BBC Radio 4 You & Yours to discuss the cost of a funeral.

On 29 November 2018, NAFD Chief Executive responded to Daily Mail article on the launch of the CMA market investigation, saying that the majority of its members had already taken steps to widen the choices that they offer. OnOn 2 February 2021, the NAFD commented on a story in The Mirror about extensive waits for funerals during the pandemic and issues with having room to store bodies.

On 23 May 2021 NAFD Chief Executive Jon Levett commented to ITV on the lifting of restrictions: Throughout the pandemic, the government has made sure immediate families were able to be there to say goodbye to a loved one and this has always been valued. But it's critical that all those who are grieving are not forgotten in the reopening of society and for many families, the current restrictions have meant telling people very close to the person that has died that they simply couldn't be there. Wed still also like to see the government move forward with its plan to trust the public to make informed, personal decisions about social contact using testing as a safety mechanism enabling us all to offer the simple comfort of holding hands, or giving a much needed hug, to those who are isolated in their grief.

In December 2021, Deborah Smith, of the National Association of Funeral Directors confirmed to the Church Times that the numbers of horse-drawn funerals had increased during the COVID-19 pandemic. Families are looking for something more personalised.

On 2 January 2022, the NAFD commented on aquamation, the funeral choice of Archbishop Desmond Tutu.

On 9 April 2022, the NAFD commented on the health and safety impact on funeral directors of larger coffins for obese people.

In April 2022, spokeswoman Deborah Smith appeared on BBC Radio 4 Money Box Live to answer questions as part of a panel on funerals and bereavement issues.

On 1 May 2022, the NAFD commented on the use of rental coffins due to the cost of living crisis.
