= Programmes internationaux d'échanges =

Programmes internationaux d’échanges (PIE)
- Founded: 1981
- Type: Educational NGO
- Purpose: To promote international education through the organisation of educational, international exchange programmes.
- Location: Paris (France)
- Region served: Worldwide
- Method: International Exchange Programs
- Leader: Laurent Bachelot, President. Maya Noble-Ludwiczak, Director
- Website: https://www.piefrance.com

Programmes Internationaux d’Echanges (PIE) is a French non-profit organisation, founded in 1981 that aims to promote international education and knowledge through the organisation of international exchange and au pair programs.

The aim of the organisation is to enable French students to live abroad with a host family, and study at a foreign school. In the same way, the organisation enables French families to host foreign students of all nationalities.

== The organisation ==
- The entirety of the PIE organisation is under the responsibility of an Administrative Council, where members are elected every three years. The council sets out the general policy and oversees its application.
- The Executive Officer, nominated by the Council, manages an executive team, which directs the exchange programs.
- A team of volunteers aids the association.

== Funding of the programs ==
Voluntary host families and free public school inscription in the foreign country, ensures the gratuity of the exchange programs in the foreign country (under a Gentlemen's agreement), as well as the student participation fees and inscriptions to the organisation. Every year, 25% of the organisation's surplus funding is donated to a scholarship funding, and another 25% is donated either to associative projects or to scholarship funds.

== Accreditation ==
Since 1990, PIE has been a member of U.N.A.T. (the National Union of Tourism Associations).

Since 1993, PIE has been a founding member of UNSE (the National Union of organisers for extended visits abroad).

Since 1996, PIE has been a founding member of Office and adheres to the terms of the Quality Contract, developed in collaboration with students' parents federations and approved consumer associations.

Since June 2025, PIE has been a member of the ATR association (Agir pour un Tourisme Responsable - Acting for Responsible Tourism).
