= Adashino Nenbutsu-ji =

Buddhist temple in Kyoto, Japan

Coordinates: 35°01′37″N 135°39′52″E

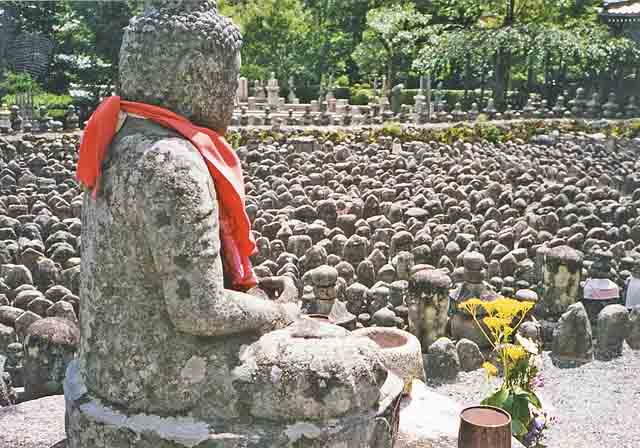
Statues at Adashino Nenbutsu-ji

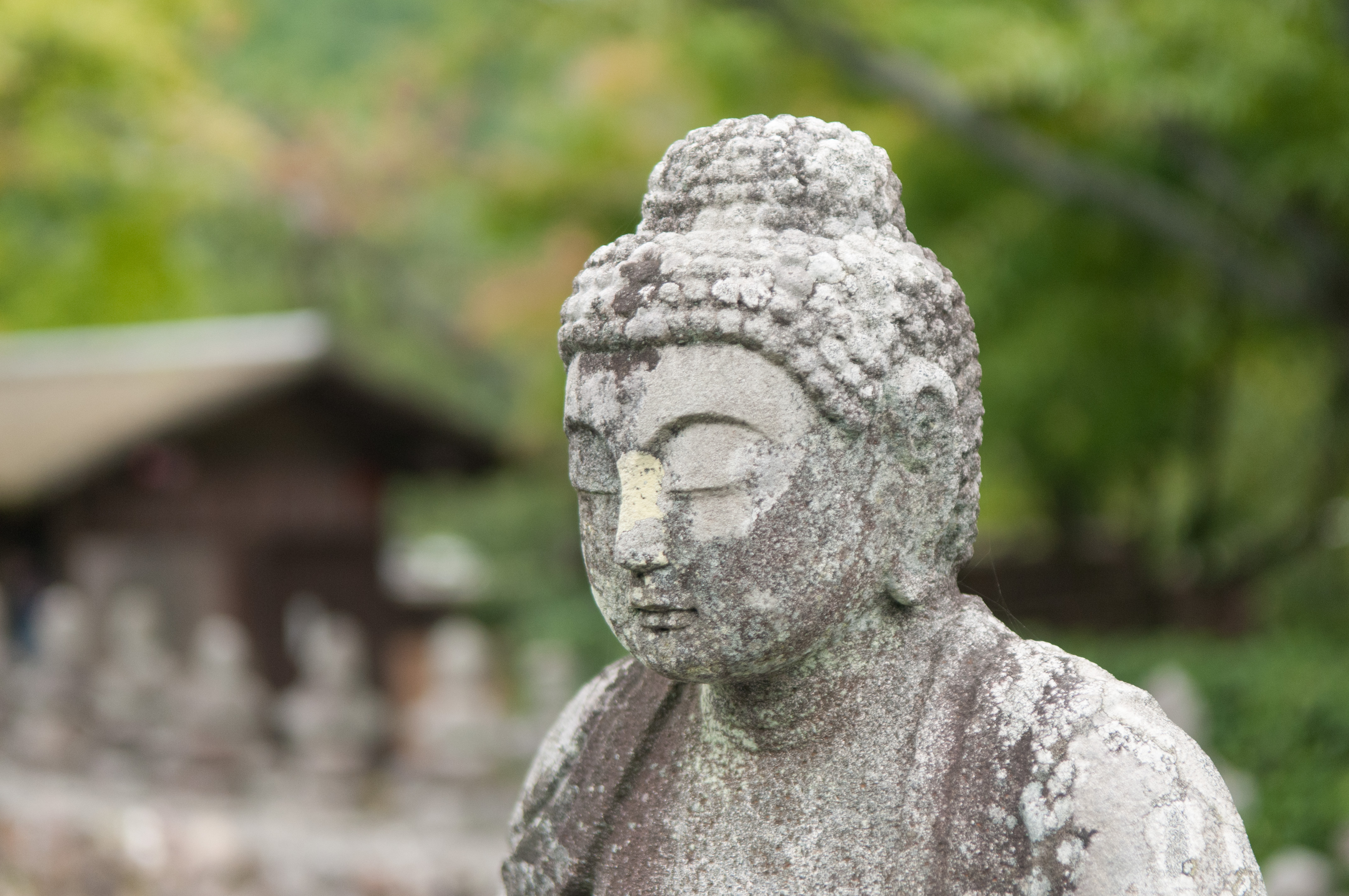
Central Buddha at Adashino

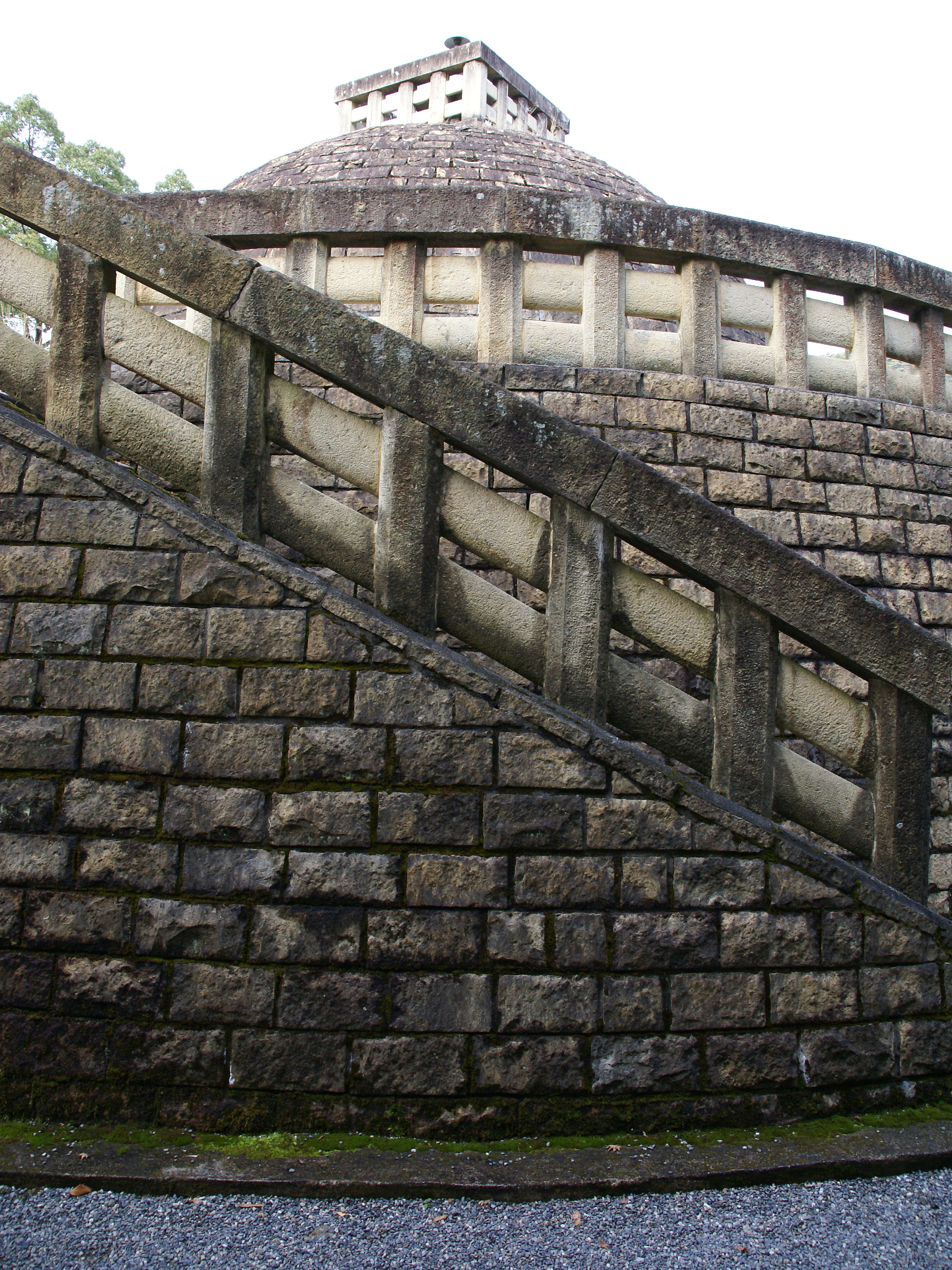
Stupa

Adashino Nenbutsu-ji (化野念仏寺, Adashino Nenbutsuji) is a Buddhist temple in Ukyo-ku, Kyoto, Japan. In 811 Kūkai is said to have founded a temple, then Honen altered it to the present Nenbutsuji. Situated high on a hill overlooking the city from the northwest, it sits in an area where since the Heian period people abandoned the bodies of the dead, exposing them to the wind and rain. Now, some eight thousand Buddhist statuettes, which had been scattered around Adashino then collected about 1903, memorialize the souls of the dead. During its well-known 'sento kuyo' ceremony dedicated to the spirits of the dead on the evenings of 23 and 24 August, about ten thousand stone statues are lit up with candles.

In its name, Adashino is a place name; Nenbutsu refers to a mantra (recitation of a buddha's name).

== Access ==
- 17, Adashino-chō, Saga-Toriimoto, Ukyō-ku, Kyoto
- Kyoto Bus (not Kyoto City Bus) Toriimoto Stop: 5 minutes walk
