= Deceased Management Advisory Group =

The Deceased Management Advisory Group (DMAG) was set up in April 2020 to provide the government of the UK with a central coordination point with the deceased management sector during the COVID-19 pandemic. It contributed to Government guidance and was signposted by Government as a source of information for the funeral sector.

DMAG comprises representatives from each of the following organisations:

- The Association of Private Crematoria and Cemeteries (APCC)
- Federation of Burial and Cremation Authorities (FBCA)
- Funeral Furnishing Manufacturers' Association (FFMA)
- Institute of Cemetery and Crematorium Management (ICCM)
- National Association of Funeral Directors (NAFD)
- National Society of Allied & Independent Funeral Directors (SAIF)
- The Cremation Society
