= Anthropology of religion =

Study of religion in relation to other social institutions

Anthropology of religion is the study of religion in relation to other social institutions, and the comparison of religious beliefs and practices across cultures. The anthropology of religion, as a field, overlaps with but is distinct from the field of Religious Studies. The history of anthropology of religion is a history of striving to understand how other people view and navigate the world. This history involves deciding what religion is, what it does, and how it functions. Today, one of the main concerns of anthropologists of religion is defining religion, which is a theoretical undertaking in and of itself. Scholars such as Edward Tylor, Emile Durkheim, E.E. Evans Pritchard, Mary Douglas, Victor Turner, Clifford Geertz, and Talal Asad have all grappled with defining and characterizing religion anthropologically.

== History ==
In the 19th century cultural anthropology was dominated by an interest in cultural evolution; most anthropologist assumed a simple distinction between "primitive" and "modern" religion and tried to provide accounts of how the former evolved into the latter.

Edward Burnett Tylor (1832-1917), sometimes called the “father of anthropology,” took an evolutionary approach to religion. Tylor defined religion as a “belief in spiritual beings” but did not believe all religions were equal or equally “true.” His evolutionary perspective is evident in his book (1871) Primitive Culture: Researches into the Development of Mythology, Philosophy, Language, Art, and Custom, in which he proposed a taxonomy of religions and believed that “primitive” religions were a result of cognitive errors. In other words, these beliefs explained natural phenomena that the people or culture did not fully understand. He called this “animism,” which included attributing a spirit to inanimate objects.

James George Frazer (1854-1941), most well-known for his book The Golden Bough, also approached the study of religion from an evolutionist perspective. Frazer's hierarchy of religions included different stages: first magic, then religious, and ending in scientific. Frazer argues that magic becomes an increasingly futile practice as religious systems develop. This is when the religious phase begins, in which the world is explained through reference to divine beings who intervene in the world. In the final stage, elites see religion as insufficient or incorrectly addressing world phenomena and begin to seek to understand the world through laws of nature.

Towards the end of the 19th century, anthropologists of religion began to question the distinctions between magic and religion made by Tylor and Frazer. William Robertson Smith (1846-1894) in Lectures of the Religion of the Semites (1899) proposed the idea of the totem. For Smith, social groups worshiped totems which represented their ancestors and worshipping totemic items accounted for the emergence of religions. Thus, Smith's theory of totemism rose in prominence within the field of anthropology of religion, challenging and in some instances fully replacing Tylor's theory of animism.

Durkheim (1858-1917) expanded on the concept of the totem, viewing religion as a collective societal force. For him, religious forces are essentially collective societal forces, embodied in the totem. The society imparts the totem with its power, meaning, and existence, which in turn gives the god or the religion its significance. In “Origins of Belief,” Durkheim argues that a totem symbolizes society, or as he calls it, the clan, and the god. As he puts it, “the totem is the visible body of God.” The totem itself might be an inconsequential object, like an animal, or a wooden cross. Despite its physical insignificance, Durkheim contends that the totem represents the clan. However, individuals do not consciously recognize that their reverence for the totem is, in fact, reverence for society itself. Instead, they perceive the totem as something external to their consciousness. In Durkheim's view, “society gives the sensation of a perpetual dependence.”

Bronislaw Malinowski (1884-1942) moved away from the inquiry into the origins of the religion shifting the theory of religion to focus on religion as a function of the social world. In his essay, “Magic, Science, and Religion,” Malinowski argues that religion in its social and psychological functions promotes social integration and community. Malinowski separates the categories of religion and magic in specifying that magic is used for functional ends: to solve problems or achieve objectives where other methods have failed.

E.E. Evans Pritchard (1902-1973) is most famous for his work on witchcraft. His book Witchcraft, Oracles and Magic Among the Azande approaches witchcraft as a cohesive and internally consistent system of knowing. While Pritchard believed that religious systems were a reflection of social environment, he was primarily concerned with thought patterns and logic within belief systems.

Victor Turner (1920-1983) understood religion through the lens of rituals, rites of passage and symbolism. He considered religion to be the lynchpin in cultural systems. In his book The Ritual Process: Structure and Anti-Structure, he proposes his theory of liminality and communitas. He developed liminality from folklorist Arnold Van Gennep. For Turner, the liminal stage is a period of ambiguity or transition where an individual's status in a ritual change from pre-ritual stage to post-ritual. The idea of communitas refers to the common experience of community during a ritual.

Mary Douglas’ (1921-2007) work and topics were inspired by Evans-Pritchard. They both explained social systems in terms of functionalism. She defined religion through the lens of ritual. In her most famous book, Purity and Danger: An Analysis of Concepts of Pollution and Taboo, she compares Western and “primitive” societies in showing that Western societies also relied on “magic” through rituals around purity and pollution, such as teeth brushing. She sees ritual as a collective force or system that places limits on the body. In this way, the image of society is carved onto the body through reiterations of purity and pollution.

Talal Asad (1932–present) is a prominent anthropologist of religion today who focuses on religion and modernity. Asad is well known for his work on religion and power. He has argued that overlooking the history of defining religion can lead us to overlook its imbrication with power. He has also pointed to the ways in which modernity has delimited religion to a certain sphere of life, so that religion can be pointed out or identified in certain ways and not in others. In doing this, he has also called for the development of a religion of secularity.

Clifford Geertz and Talal Asad publicly debated the “universal” nature of religion. While Geertz provided an operational definition for religion that allowed for variation across cultures, he saw this definition as encapsulating certain universal features of “religion.” Alternatively, Asad questioned the very existence of “universal religion” in pointing to the ways in which ideas about the universal were rooted in distinctly Christian ideas and traditions. Influenced by Michel Foucault and Edward Said, Asad questions the conceptual assumptions involved in or undergirding the production of knowledge. This is what led Asad to question the existence of separate sphere of society that could be called or identified as “religion.” In undermining the existence of religion as a separate sphere, Asad points to Western modernity as producing religion as distinct from other parts of society.

One key component of anthropology of religion is ethnographic fieldwork. This is what makes anthropologists who study religion distinct from other Religious Studies scholars. Ethnography is most simply put, the empirical observation and detailed description of individuals, societies, and cultures. For anthropologists of religion, ethnographic fieldwork focuses on lived religion through the study of rituals, worship, religious values, and other daily components of faith. Developments in ethnographic approaches to the study of religion or theoretical developments in the ethnographic study of religion have spanned decades.

Evolutionist perspectives were reflective of Darwinian theories of evolution and saw religious systems in a taxonomic and hierarchical way: some religions were closer to the truth than others and Christianity was always at the top of pyramid. Functionalist perspectives aimed to study religion as a part of society that played an important an integral role: non-Christian religions were not compared to Christianity on a sliding scale, but rather taken in context with the whole cultural context. Humanist theories of evolution see religions as products of human culture and invention, rather than metaphysical or supernatural phenomena that “exist” outside of the human cultures that produce them. Cross-cultural or comparative theories of religion focus on “religion” as something that can be found and compared across all human cultures and societies.

The anthropology of religion today reflects the influence of, or an engagement with, such theorists as Karl Marx (1818-1883), Sigmund Freud (1856-1939), Émile Durkheim (1858-1917), and Max Weber (1864-1920). Anthropologists of religion are especially concerned with how religious beliefs and practices may reflect political or economic forces; or the social functions of religious beliefs and practices.

Recently, a prominent ethnographer of religion, Robert Orsi, has asked scholars of religion to abandon the empirical approach to ethnography of religion that was co-emergent with modernity. This approach entails the impulse to explain God or gods in people's lives as a function or symbol of some other thing. Orsi asks those who study religion to instead take God and gods as real actors, really present.

== Definition of religion ==
One major problem in the anthropology of religion is the definition of religion itself. At one time anthropologists believed that certain religious practices and beliefs were more or less universal to all cultures at some point in their development, such as a belief in spirits or ghosts, the use of magic as a means of controlling the supernatural, the use of divination as a means of discovering occult knowledge, and the performance of rituals such as prayer and sacrifice as a means of influencing the outcome of various events through a supernatural agency, sometimes taking the form of shamanism or ancestor worship. According to Clifford Geertz, religion is

"(1) a system of symbols which acts to (2) establish powerful, pervasive, and long-lasting moods and motivations in men by (3) formulating conceptions of a general order of existence and (4) clothing these conceptions with such an aura of factuality that (5) the moods and motivations seem uniquely realistic."

Today, religious anthropologists debate, and reject, the cross-cultural validity of these categories (often viewing them as examples of European primitivism). Anthropologists have considered various criteria for defining religion – such as a belief in the supernatural or the reliance on ritual – but few claim that these criteria are universally valid.

Anthony F. C. Wallace proposes four categories of religion, each subsequent category subsuming the previous. These are, however, synthetic categories and do not necessarily encompass all religions.

1. Individualistic: most basic; simplest. Example: vision quest.
2. Shamanistic: part-time religious practitioner, uses religion to heal, to divine, usually on the behalf of a client. The Tillamook have four categories of shaman. Examples of shamans: spiritualists, faith healers, palm readers. Religious authority acquired through one's own means.
3. Communal: elaborate set of beliefs and practices; group of people arranged in clans by lineage, age group, or some religious societies; people take on roles based on knowledge, and ancestral worship.
4. Ecclesiastical: dominant in agricultural societies and states; are centrally organized and hierarchical in structure, paralleling the organization of states. Typically deprecates competing individualistic and shamanistic cults.

== Specific religious practices and beliefs ==
- Apotheosis – Glorification of a subject to divine level
- Apotropaic magic – Magic intended to turn away harm or evil influences
- Amulet – Object believed to offer protection or grace on the wearer
- Animism – Class of religious beliefs
- Circumcision – Removal of the human foreskin
- Cult (religious practice) – Devotion to a deity, person or thing
- Deity – Supernatural being
- Demon – Evil supernatural being
- Divination – Attempt to gain insight into a question or situation through magic or the supernatural
- Exorcism – Evicting spiritual entities from a person or area
- Evil – Opposite or absence of good
- Fertility rite – Religious ritual intended to stimulate reproduction
- Fetishism – Human attribution of special powers or value to an object
- Genius (mythology) – Divine nature in ancient Roman religion
- God – Supreme deity in theistic belief systems
- Ghost – Supernatural being originating in folklore
- Greco-Roman mysteries – Religious schools of the Greco-Roman world
- Heresy – Belief that is strongly at variance with customs
- Icon – Religious work of art in Christianity
- Immortality – Concept of eternal life
- Intercession – Praying to God in heaven on behalf of oneself or others
- Kachina – Spirit being in western Pueblo religious beliefs
- Magic and religion
- Mana (Oceanian cultures) – Life force energy, power, effectiveness, and prestige in Pacific Island culture
- Mask – Full or partial face covering
- Miracle – Event not explicable by natural or scientific laws
- Medicine – Diagnosis, treatment, and prevention of illness
- Modern paganism – Religions shaped by historical paganism
- Monotheism – Belief that there is only one God
- Mother goddess – Goddess representing motherhood or fertility
- Mythology – Type of traditional narrative
- Necromancy – Magic involving communication with the deceased
- New Age – Range of new religious beliefs and practices
- Occult – Knowledge of the hidden or the paranormal
- Omen – Future-predicting phenomenon
- Poles in mythology – Stake or post used in ritual practice
- Polytheism – Worship of or belief in multiple deities
- Prayer – Invocation or act that seeks to activate a rapport with a deity
- Principle of contagion
- Prophecy – Message claimed to be from a deity
- Reincarnation – Concept of rebirth in different physical form
- Religious ecstasy – Altered state of consciousness
- Ritual – Activities performed according to a set sequence
- Sacred food as offering – Concept within anthropology
- Sacrifice – Offering of material possessions or the lives of animals or humans to a deity
- Science and religion
- Shamanism – Religious practice
- Spell (paranormal) – Formula intended to trigger a magical effect
- Supernatural – Phenomena not subject to the laws of nature
- Supplication – Form of prayer
- Sympathetic magic – Type of magic based on imitation or correspondence
- Theism – Belief in God or gods
- Totemism – Emblem of a group of people
- Veneration of the dead – Cultural or religious practice
- Western esotericism – Range of related ideas and movements that have developed in the Western world

== See also ==
- Archaeology of religion and ritual
- Cognitive science of religion – Study of religious thought and behavior
- Evolutionary origin of religions – Emergence of religious behavior discussed in terms of natural evolution
- Magic and religion
- Psychology of religion – Analytic approach to religion
- Religious symbolism – Icon representing a particular religion
- Rite of passage – Ritual reflecting change of social status
- Sacred–profane dichotomy – Lack of respect for things that are held to be sacred
- Sociology of religion
- Symbolic anthropology – Study of cultural symbols
