= Burial vault (enclosure) =

Container that encloses a coffin

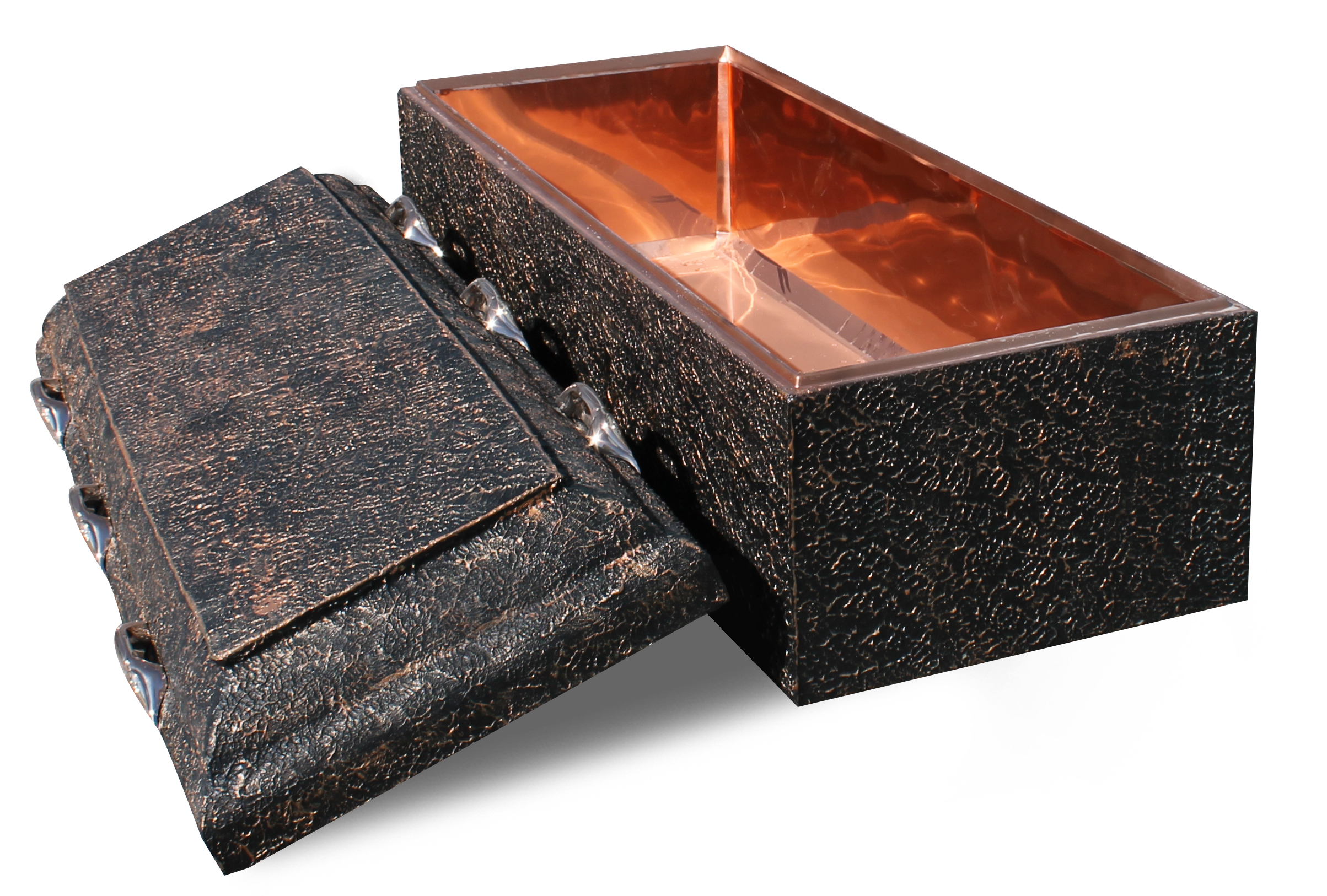
Burial vault with copper inner liner

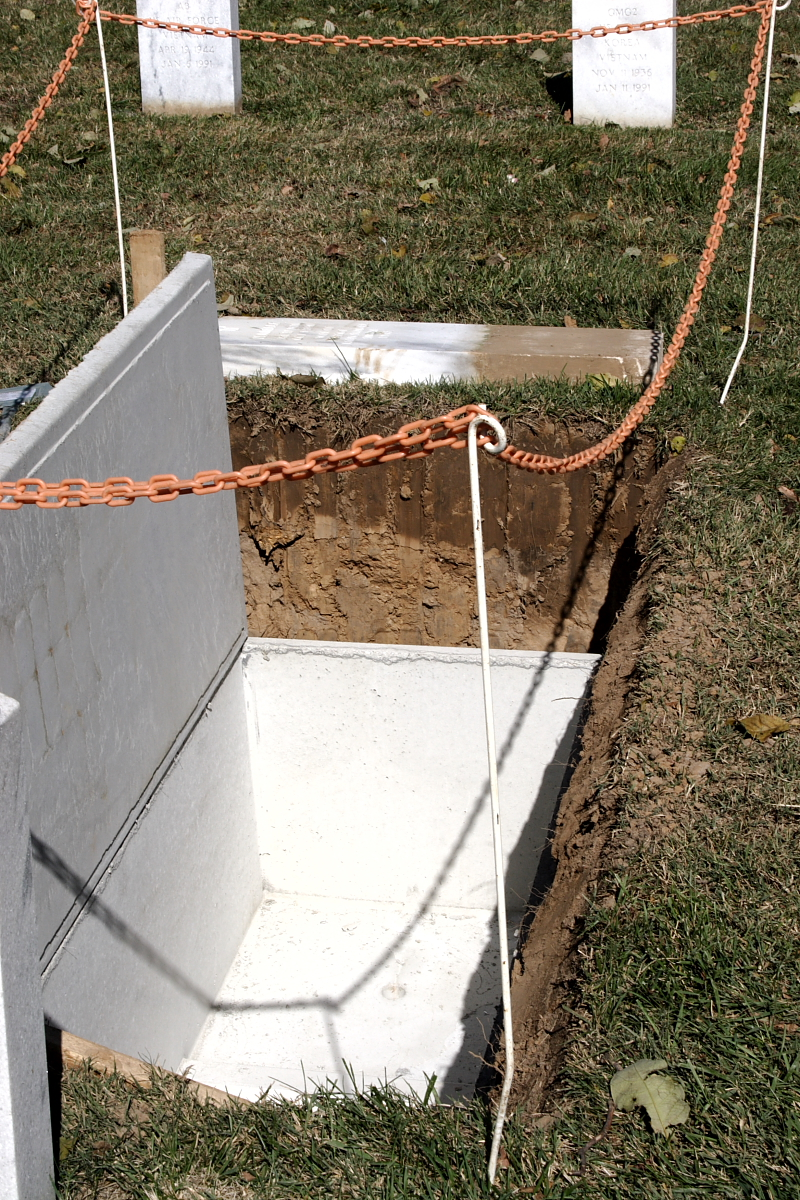
Open burial vault awaiting coffin (2006)

A burial vault (also known as a burial liner, grave vault, and grave liner) is a container, formerly made of wood or brick but more often today made of metal or concrete, that encloses a coffin to help prevent a grave from sinking. Wooden coffins (or caskets) decompose, and often the weight of earth on top of the coffin, or the passage of heavy cemetery maintenance equipment over it, can cause the casket to collapse and the soil above it to settle.

== Description and usage ==
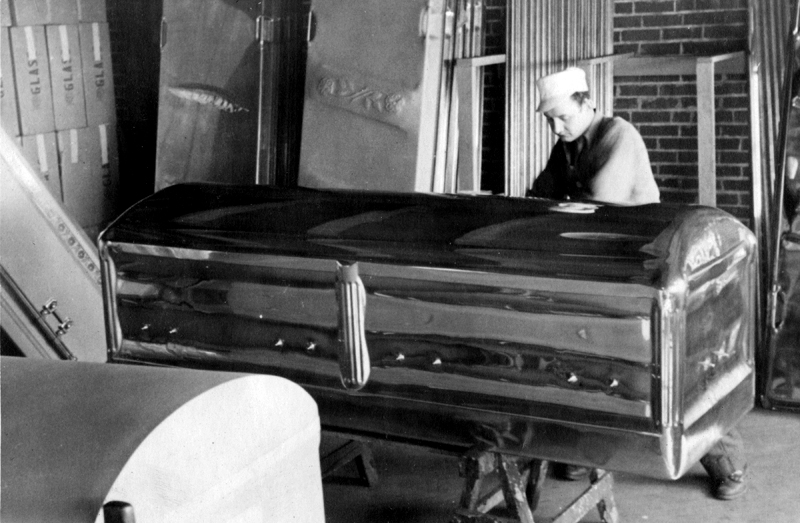
A burial vault is prepared for shipment by an employee at Clark Grave Vault, Columbus, Ohio, 1938.

The burial vault or burial liner is designed to prevent the weight of earth or heavy cemetery maintenance equipment from collapsing the coffin beneath. Coffin collapse will cause the ground to sink and settle, marring the appearance of the cemetery and making it harder to maintain. Burial vaults originally emerged as a means of ensuring that grave robbers could not easily access a coffin and remove valuables, clothing, or even bodies from the coffin. Early vaults were made of wood (the "rough box"), although by the middle of the 1800s brick, iron and later steel vaults were used. By the late 1800s, the fashion of burying the deceased with jewelry lost favor. However, the value of burial vaults in ensuring that the ground did not settle over graves was seen, and burial vaults began to be more widely used. By the early part of the 20th century, concrete (and, later, reinforced concrete) vaults became more common.

The burial vault was largely unknown until the 1880s when the L.G. Haase Manufacturing Co., which owned a cemetery in Illinois, conceived the burial vault as a means of adding a product line to their funerary sales. As late as 1915, only 5 to 10 percent of funerals in the United States used a burial vault or liner. In the 1930s, company owner Wilbert Haase, who had an interest in Egyptian mummification, began promoting the sealed (or "waterproof") vault as a means of allegedly protecting the body from water, microbes, and vermin. The Haase company later purchased several plastics companies, and began manufacturing plastic burial vaults as well. The company dominates the American burial vault market today, with about 12 percent of all vault and liner sales.

A burial vault encloses a coffin on all four sides, the top, and the bottom. Modern burial vaults are lowered into the grave, and the coffin lowered into the vault. A lid is then lowered to cover the coffin and seal the vault. Modern burial vaults may be made of concrete, metal, or plastic. Because the sides of the burial vault are attached to the bottom of the vault, the burial vault is generally stronger than a burial liner. Some burial vaults reverse the construction, so that only a base is placed beneath the coffin. The lid consists of the four sides and the top. These types of burial vaults allow a better seal between the lid and base.

A burial liner is similar to a burial vault, but does not have a bottom. With a burial liner, the coffin is lowered directly onto the earth. The burial liner is then lowered over the coffin. Modern burial liners may also be made of concrete, metal, or plastic. Many come in a wide array of colors, even stripes.

Burial vaults do not prevent the decomposition of the human remains within. Vaults which are installed incorrectly and too tightly sealed may not allow gases generated by the decomposing body to escape. Pressure then builds up within the vault until the vault ruptures, causing the vault to fail. Although some manufacturers of burial vaults claim that their vaults are "green" (environmentally friendly) and prevent the toxic chemicals used in embalming from leaching into the surrounding soil, such claims are uniformly false since the vault cannot be hermetically sealed without causing it to rupture from the pressure of decomposition gases. A truly "green" or natural burial does not use embalming fluids, and does not attempt to protect the body from the soil and rapid decomposition.

Modern burial vaults often come in a variety of styles, which can greatly increase the cost. Modern vaults and liners sometimes are lined on the inside with bronze, copper, fiberglass, or stainless steel sheeting, and some vaults and liners are inscribed on the outer surface with words, scenes, or other images.

Some jurisdictions require the use of a burial vault or burial liner. For example, several U.S. states require them. In some cases, cemeteries require the use of a burial vault or liner, although it is not a legal requirement.

== World usage ==
Data on the use of burial vaults and liners outside the United States is very difficult to come by, and usage rates are not known. Burial vaults and liners are almost unheard of in China and Japan. Cremation is required in China, and is used in 90 percent of burials in Japan. They are also uncommon in Italy. In modern Italy, burial plots (either below-ground or in wall loculi) are re-used after a period of years, usually 10 to 25. At that time, most of the soft body parts have decomposed, and the bones are removed to an ossuary.

In the United States, the use of burial vaults is also decreasing, caused by a sharp rise in the number of cremations. Whereas 36 percent of all deceased were cremated in the United States in 2008, the National Association of Funeral Directors forecast this to rise to 46 percent by 2015 and 59 percent by 2025.

== Religious usage ==
Jewish law does not bar the use of burial vaults or liners, and their use is permitted where law or a cemetery requires them. But Morrison David Bial argues that burial vaults are antithetical to traditional Judaism, in part because they deny the reality of death (e.g., inhibit decomposition of the body) and in part because they are ostentatious and undercut the equality of all people at death.

Islamic law requires only that the body be washed, anointed, and wrapped in linen for burial. Funerals must be kept simple, and no ostentation is allowed. Preferably, the body should be buried without coffin or burial vault, although such is permitted if required by law. Generally, Muslims prefer to have separate cemeteries due to the specific preference for burial without coffin or vault.

== Criticisms ==
Burial vaults and liners do not decompose, and have been criticized as being environmentally unfriendly. Burial vaults and liners consumed more than 14,000 short tons (13,000 t) of steel and more than 1,636,000 short tons (1,484,000 t) of reinforced concrete in 2009.

A burial vault or liner is not the only solution to settling earth over the grave. Traditional burials with a casket leave a larger void and thus could create more settlement when the casket decomposes or collapses, but that is naturally replaced by the original earth heaped onto the grave mound. Natural or "green" burials do not use a casket, which means only minimal settling. In any case, the cemetery can remedy sunken graves by filling in the settled area.

== Urn vaults ==
In the case of cremation, an urn vault would be placed at a traditional plot in a cemetery after either a funeral, celebration of life or memorial service (service of remembrance outside the United States) at a funeral home or crematorium. Its major significant purpose is to hold the weight of the earth as well as protect cremains of the deceased as well as investment for it after the interment.
