= Superburial =

Area of dense burial activity

A superburial is similar to a mass grave, but is a term typically used by archaeologists to denote an area of dense burial activity without the negative connotations often associated with mass graves. A superburial may also span a much longer time period than is typical for a mass grave, such as a cemetery in constant use for centuries.

The term has also been used to describe burials found in good condition and with a number of artifacts.

== List of superburials under current excavation (far from complete) ==
- Valley of the Kings
- Ban Non Wat

== See also ==
- List of archaeological sites sorted by country
