= The Settlers =

City-building and real-time strategy video game series introduced in 1993

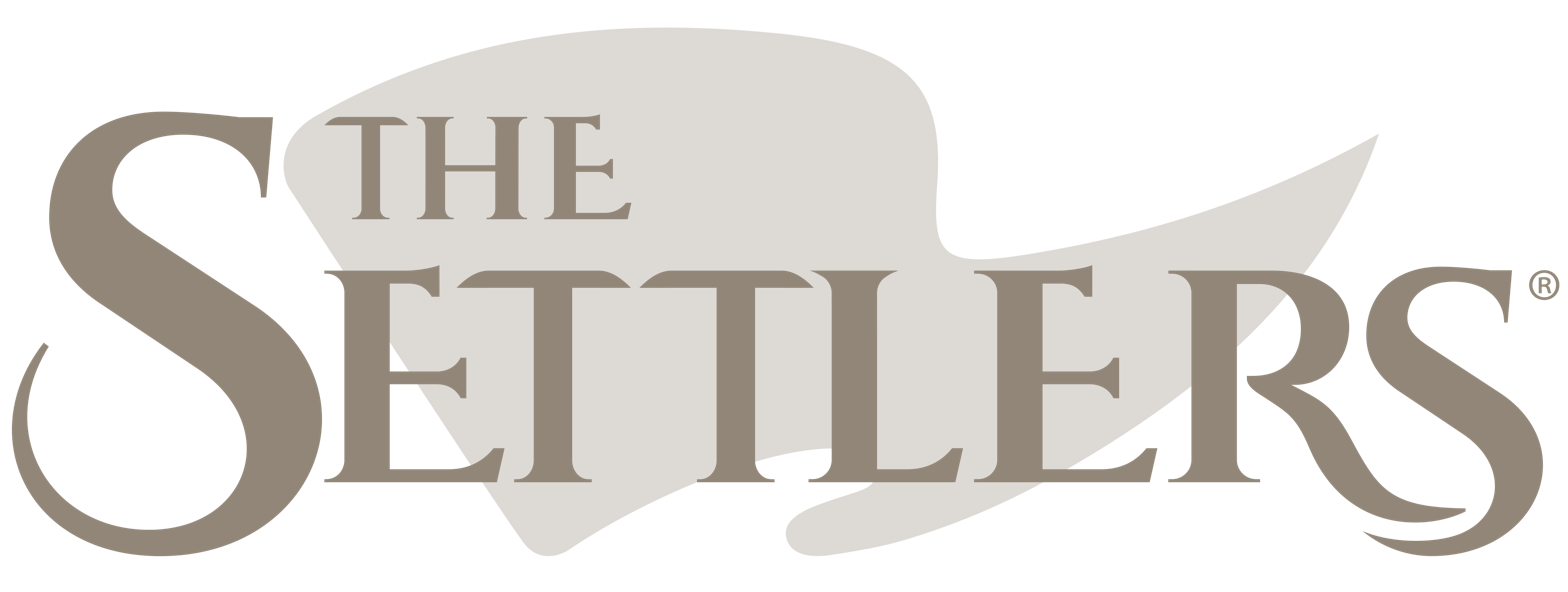
- Genres: City-building, real-time strategy
- Developer: Ubisoft Blue Byte
- Publishers: Ubisoft Blue Byte (1993-2001); Ubisoft (2001-)
- Creator: Volker Wertich
- Platforms: Amiga; Android; bada; Browser; Classic Mac OS; iOS; Linux; macOS; MS-DOS; Nintendo DS; Symbian; webOS; Windows
- First release: The Settlers; June 30, 1993
- Latest release: The Settlers: New Allies; February 17, 2023

The Settlers (German: Die Siedler) is a city-building and real-time strategy video game series created by Volker Wertich in 1993. The original game was released on the Amiga, with subsequent games released primarily on MS-DOS and Windows: The Settlers II (1996), The Settlers III (1998), The Settlers IV (2001), The Settlers: Heritage of Kings (2004), The Settlers: Rise of an Empire (2007), and The Settlers 7: Paths to a Kingdom (2010). There are also several spin-offs; The Settlers II (10th Anniversary) (2006) is a remake of The Settlers II, The Settlers DS (2007) is a port of The Settlers II for Nintendo DS, Die Siedler: Aufbruch der Kulturen (2008) is a German-only spiritual successor to 10th Anniversary, The Settlers HD (2009) is a handheld remake of The Settlers IV, and The Settlers Online (2010) is a free-to-play online browser game. With the exception of The Settlers HD, Ubisoft Blue Byte has developed every game in the series and published the first three titles. From The Settlers IV onwards, Ubisoft has published all titles.

An eighth game in the main series, The Settlers: Kingdoms of Anteria, was scheduled for release in 2014, but after the game's closed beta was abruptly shut down by Ubisoft in light of negative feedback, the game was removed from the release schedule. It was ultimately repackaged and released in 2016 as Champions of Anteria, an action role-playing game unrelated to The Settlers series. A franchise reboot, initially named simply The Settlers, was scheduled for release in 2019, but was postponed and all preorders were refunded. In January 2022, Ubisoft announced that the game would be released in March of that year. In March, however, it was again postponed. In November, Ubisoft revealed the game was now called The Settlers: New Allies. It was ultimately released in February 2023.

Narratively, each game is a stand-alone story with no connection to the other titles in the series (although Rise of an Empire is an indirect sequel to Heritage of Kings). From a gameplay perspective, although each game tends to feature its own set of innovations and nuances, broadly speaking, they are all built on a simulation of a supply and demand economic system in which the player must maintain the various chains of production, building up their military strength and the robustness of their economy so as to defeat their opponents and achieve certain predetermined objectives. Some games foreground city-building and complex daisy-chain economic processes whereas others focus on real-time strategy and building a diverse military force. Common game mechanics include resource acquisition, economic micromanagement, managing taxation, maintaining a high standard of living, trade, and technology trees.

Critically, reactions to the games have been mixed, ranging from universal praise for The Settlers II to universal condemnation for The Settlers DS. The series has sold very well, with global sales of over 10 million units as of September 2014. It has sold especially well in Europe. The games have also done well at various game award shows, and the series features two recipients of the "Best Game" award at the annual Deutscher Entwicklerpreis.

== Games ==
Release timeline
1993	The Settlers
1994
1995
1996	The Settlers II
1997
1998	The Settlers III
1999
2000
2001	The Settlers IV
2002
2003
2004	The Settlers: Heritage of Kings
2005
2006	The Settlers II (10th Anniversary)
2007	The Settlers DS
2007	The Settlers: Rise of an Empire
2008	Die Siedler: Aufbruch der Kulturen
2009	The Settlers HD
2010	The Settlers 7: Paths to a Kingdom
2010	The Settlers Online
2011
2012
2013
2014	The Settlers: Kingdoms of Anteria (cancelled)
2015
2016
2017
2018	The Settlers: History Collection
2019
2020
2021
2022
2023	The Settlers: New Allies

=== Main series ===
- The Settlers (German: Die Siedler) was developed and published by Blue Byte, and released for the Amiga in 1993. A port for MS-DOS was developed by Blue Byte and Massive Development and released in 1994. Blue Byte published the port in Europe, whilst Strategic Simulations handled North American publication, where the game was released as Serf City: Life is Feudal. In 2018, Ubisoft re-released the game for Microsoft Windows as The Settlers: History Edition.
- The Settlers II (German: Die Siedler II), originally named The Settlers II: Veni, Vidi, Vici, was released for MS-DOS in 1996. Later that year, Blue Byte released an expansion, The Settlers II Mission CD. In 1997, they released The Settlers II: Gold Edition, containing the original game and the Mission CD expansion. A Mac OS port of the Gold Edition was also released in North America in 1997. In 2009, the Gold Edition was released on GOG.com. In 2018, Ubisoft re-released the Gold Edition for Microsoft Windows as The Settlers II: History Edition.
- The Settlers III (German: Die Siedler III) was released for Microsoft Windows in 1998. In 1999, Blue Byte released two expansions - The Settlers III Mission CD and The Settlers III: Quest of the Amazons (German: Die Siedler III: Das Geheimnis der Amazonen). In 2000, they released The Settlers III: Gold Edition, containing the original game and both expansions. In 2013, the Gold Edition was released on GOG.com under its North American title, The Settlers III: Ultimate Collection. In 2018, Ubisoft re-released the Gold Edition as The Settlers III: History Edition.
- The Settlers IV (German: Die Siedler IV), named The Settlers: Fourth Edition in North America, was released for Microsoft Windows in 2001 and was the first game in the series published by Ubisoft. Later that year, Blue Byte released two expansions - The Settlers IV Mission CD and The Settlers IV: The Trojans and the Elixir of Power (German: Die Siedler IV: Die Trojaner und das Elixier der Macht). In 2002, they released The Settlers IV: Gold Edition, containing the original game and both expansions. A third expansion was released to the German-only market in 2002, Die Siedler IV: Die Neue Welt (English: The Settlers IV: The New World) and a fourth came in 2003, Die Siedler IV: Community Pack. In 2013, the Gold Edition was released on GOG.com. In 2018, Ubisoft re-released the Gold Edition as The Settlers IV: History Edition.
- The Settlers: Heritage of Kings (German: Die Siedler: Das Erbe der Könige), named Heritage of Kings: The Settlers in North America, was released for Microsoft Windows in 2004. In 2005, Blue Byte released two expansions - The Settlers: Heritage of Kings - Expansion Disc (German: Die Siedler: Das Erbe der Könige - Nebelreich) and The Settlers: Heritage of Kings - Legends Expansion Disc (German: Die Siedler: Das Erbe der Könige - Legenden). Later that year, they released The Settlers: Heritage of Kings - Gold Edition, containing the original game and the first expansion. In 2009, the original game was released on GOG.com. In 2018, Ubisoft re-released the Gold Edition as The Settlers: Heritage of Kings - History Edition.
- The Settlers: Rise of an Empire (German: Die Siedler: Aufstieg eines Königreichs) was released for Microsoft Windows in 2007. In 2008, Blue Byte released an expansion, The Settlers: Rise of an Empire - The Eastern Realm (German: Die Siedler: Aufstieg eines Königreichs - Reich des Ostens). Later that year, they released The Settlers: Rise of an Empire - Gold Edition, containing the original game and the Eastern Realm expansion. In 2015, the Gold Edition was released on GOG.com. In 2018, Ubisoft re-released the Gold Edition as The Settlers: Rise of an Empire - History Edition.
- The Settlers 7: Paths to a Kingdom (German: Die Siedler 7) was released for Microsoft Windows and macOS in 2010. Later that year, Blue Byte released three DLC packs - Uncharted Land (German: DLC Pack 1), Conquest - The Empire (German: DLC Pack 2), and Rise of the Rebellion (German: DLC Pack 3). In 2011, The Settlers 7: Paths to a Kingdom - Deluxe Gold Edition was released, containing the original game, the three DLC packs, and an unlock code for an upcoming fourth pack. That pack, The Two Kings (German: Die zwei Könige), was released later in the year. In 2018, Ubisoft re-released the Deluxe Gold Edition as The Settlers 7: Paths to a Kingdom - History Edition.
- The Settlers: Kingdoms of Anteria (German: Die Siedler: Königreiche von Anteria) was scheduled for release in 2014. However, Ubisoft abruptly cancelled a closed beta after the game received primarily negative feedback. Nothing more was heard about the title until 2016, when Blue Byte announced they had redesigned it as an action role-playing game which was no longer part of The Settlers series. The renamed Champions of Anteria was released for Microsoft Windows later that year.
- The Settlers: New Allies (German: Die Siedler: Neue Allianzen), initially called simply The Settlers, was originally slated for release in 2019. It was then rescheduled for the third quarter of 2020, but in July, it was postponed indefinitely and preorders were refunded. In January 2022, Ubisoft announced that the game was nearing completion and was scheduled for release in March. However, the game's closed beta received highly negative feedback. Acting on this feedback, Ubisoft announced in early March that the game was postponed until "a later date." In November 2022, they revealed the game had a new title (The Settlers: New Allies) and was slated for release in February 2023. They also revealed that for the first time in the series' history, a Settlers game would be a multi-platform title, with plans to release the game on the Nintendo Switch, PlayStation 4, PlayStation 5, Xbox One and Xbox Series X/S. The PC version of the game released in February 2023 as planned, with all other versions releasing in July.

=== Spin-offs ===
- The Settlers II (10th Anniversary) (German: Die Siedler II: Die nächste Generation) is a remake of The Settlers II, released for Microsoft Windows in 2006. In 2007, Blue Byte released an expansion to the German-only market, Die Siedler II: Die nächste Generation - Wikinger (English: The Settlers II: The Next Generation - Vikings). In 2013, the original game was released on GOG.com.
- The Settlers DS is a port of The Settlers II: Gold Edition for Nintendo DS, released in 2007.
- Die Siedler: Aufbruch der Kulturen (English: The Settlers: Awakening of Cultures), is a spiritual successor to Die nächste Generation, released in Germany in 2008.
- The Settlers HD was developed and published by Gameloft, working in conjunction with Blue Byte, under license by Ubisoft. It is a remake of The Settlers IV, and was released for iOS in 2009, for webOS and bada in 2010, and for Symbian and Android in 2011.
- The Settlers Online, named The Settlers Online: Castle Empire in North America, is a free-to-play online browser game for Linux, macOS, and Microsoft Windows. It was released in 2010.
- The Settlers: My City (German: Die Siedler: Meine stadt) is a Facebook browser game that serves as a tie-in for Settlers 7. It was released in May 2010.

== Gameplay overview ==
The core elements of The Settlers' gameplay are city-building and real-time strategy. Both the original Settlers and The Settlers II are city-building games with real-time strategy elements, and have similar gameplay and game mechanics. Unlike the first two games, The Settlers III and The Settlers IV foreground real-time strategy elements over city-building, with more focus on combat than their predecessors. The Settlers: Heritage of Kings is unique in the franchise insofar as it focuses almost exclusively on real-time strategy and combat. After Heritage of Kings received a negative reaction from fans, the next game, The Settlers: Rise of an Empire, returned to foregrounding city-building over real-time strategy. This was true to an even greater degree in the following game, The Settlers 7: Paths to a Kingdom, whose gameplay was based on the most popular title in the series; The Settlers II.

In the first five games, the primary goal on each map, broadly speaking, is to build a settlement with a functioning economy, producing sufficient military units so as to conquer rival territories. To achieve this end, the player must, to one degree or another, engage in economic micromanagement, construct buildings, and generate resources. In Rise of an Empire and Paths to a Kingdom, the importance of military conquest is scaled back, with many maps requiring players to accomplish certain predetermined tasks tied to the economic strength of their city. Whilst the first four games feature broadly similar supply and demand-based gameplay, starting with Heritage of Kings, Blue Byte began to alter the game mechanics from title to title. So, with Heritage of Kings, there is little focus on micromanagement, daisy-chain economic processes, or construction, and more on technology trees, combat, taxation, and workers' motivation. Rise of an Empire features a significantly simpler economic model than any previous title in the series, with the complexity of the various supply chains significantly streamlined. Paths to a Kingdom features a more robust economy and focuses on micromanagement, daisy-chain economic processes, city organisation, upgrading buildings, technology trees, and trade requirements. Additionally, for the first time in the series, the gameplay in Paths to a Kingdom is flexible enough to allow players to develop their settlement based upon one (or more) of three basic options - military, technology or trade.

=== Settlements and settlers ===
The gameplay of every Settlers title revolves around serfs (the titular "settlers"). In all games except Heritage of Kings, serfs transport materials, tools and produce, and populate and perform the requisite task of each building. In Heritage, serfs are differentiated from workers - serfs are the only units capable of constructing new buildings, repairing damage to pre-existing buildings, gathering wood, and extracting resources by hand, whereas workers occupy buildings. In no game except Heritage does the player directly control any individual settler - instead, the player issues general orders, with the AI handling the delegation to specific settlers. In Heritage of Kings, the player can directly control serfs, such as ordering them to chop down trees in a particular location, or scout unexplored territory. Workers, however, cannot be controlled.

In The Settlers, The Settlers II, Rise of an Empire, and Paths to a Kingdom, as the player constructs buildings and thus requires settlers to occupy them, the settlers are automatically generated as needed. In The Settlers and The Settlers II, as the settlement continues to grow in size, the quota of settlers will eventually be reached, and the player will need to build a warehouse to generate more settlers. In Rise of an Empire and Paths to a Kingdom, once the settlement's quota has been reached, new settlers can only generate once the player has increased living space, either by building new residences or upgrading existing ones. In both The Settlers III and The Settlers IV, new settlers aren't generated as needed; instead, a set number is added to the player's pool upon the construction of residences. In Heritage of Kings, the player manually recruits serfs as needed. Once the serfs have constructed a building which requires workers, those workers will automatically emerge from the village centre and occupy the building. Once the settlement's quota has been reached, the player must either upgrade the centre or build an additional one.

Screenshot of The Settlers II showing the various buildings linked by roads. The roads are demarcated by waypoints (blue flags), which function as hubs for the distribution of goods, with a single settler operating between each flag.

In the first two games, an important game mechanic is the construction of a road network to allow for an efficient transportation system, as any settlers transporting goods must use roads. To maximize distribution, the player must set as many flags as possible on each road. Flags can only be set a certain distance apart, and serve as transport hubs; a settler will carry an item to a flag and set it down, at which point the next settler along will pick up the item and continue, freeing the first settler to return and pick up another item at the previous flag. A major change came in The Settlers III, where roads were no longer necessary, and settlers could walk freely around the player's territory, with the AI handling pathfinding. Aside from The Settlers II (10th Anniversary), roads were not a requirement again until Paths to a Kingdom (players could build roads in Rise of an Empire, but they were optional).

=== Economy ===
The first four titles in the series feature a broadly similar economic system built on a foundation of basic supply and demand, and in all four games, the player can control the economy in various rudimentary ways. For example, the player can adjust the distribution of goods by selecting which percentage of a given resource is transported to a given building. In a similar manner, the player can select what tools are made when, which is important insofar as all buildings require raw materials and a worker with the right tool.

The economic systems in the Heritage of Kings, Rise of an Empire, and Paths to a Kingdom differ substantially from the first four games, and from one another. In Heritage, for example, the player must manage taxation. Serfs do not need lodgings, nor do they consume produce, but they also do not pay taxes. Workers, on the other hand, need both lodgings and sustenance (provided by farms), and the closer the lodgings and farm are to their workplace, the more productive they will be. A major change to the mechanics in Heritage of Kings is that unlike the previous four games, serfs no longer transport resources. Instead, resources are automatically deposited into the player's storehouse, and the various refinery workers collect the materials for processing themselves. In the case of construction, the necessary resources are automatically transferred to the building site without having to be physically transported. Another new feature is the ability to upgrade buildings, which can increase efficiency or capacity, grant access to new abilities, or allow access to new technologies.

Rise of an Empire features a considerably streamlined economic model when compared to all previous titles, with the most basic production chains of any game in the series (usually involving only two buildings). A settler in a resource building will walk to the nearest source of raw materials, gather them, and return to his building. When the building is full, one of the settlers living there will take the resources to the storehouse. A settler in a produce building will then walk to the storehouse and bring the raw materials back to his building, using them to make finished goods, which are then sold from that same building. New to Rise of an Empire are needs and wants. Settlers in resource buildings have only one need (food), and no wants. Settlers in produce buildings have wants under two headings (prosperity and decoration), and as the city grows, they acquire increasingly diversified needs. If the player doesn't ensure a settler's needs are met, that settler will eventually go on strike.

Screenshot of Paths to a Kingdom showing how the player can set up base buildings and work yards

In Paths to a Kingdom, the way the player interacts with buildings is substantially different from any previous title in the series. Work yards cannot be built directly, but must be attached to a base building. Each base building can have three work yards attached (depending on the availability of space), and each base has specific yards which cannot be attached to other buildings. The rate of work yards can be modified by controlling the distribution of food. Although some work yards don't require food, the player is free to send both "plain food" (fish and bread) and "fancy food" (sausages) to the base buildings, with plain food doubling production and fancy food tripling it. Work yards which do require food can be supplied with fancy food, which will double production.

=== Military ===
In the first four titles, the player's territory can only be expanded by building a military complex near the territory border and having at least one soldier stationed within, or by conquering an enemy complex. In The Settlers and The Settlers II, soldiers are automatically created from the pool of existing settlers as needed. In The Settlers III and The Settlers IV, the player must manually recruit soldiers by building a barracks, with each soldier requiring their requisite weapon to transition from settler to soldier.

In Heritage of Kings, military recruitment is substantially different than previous titles. When the player recruits a soldier, that soldier is automatically a captain, and, provided there are sufficient resources, a set number of soldiers are simultaneously recruited and assigned to that captain. Once a captain has soldiers assigned, and at least one of those soldiers remains alive, he is invulnerable in battle. When all soldiers within his group have been killed, a captain can return to the vicinity of the barracks, where the player can recruit replacement units without the need to recruit another captain. In Rise of an Empire, similarly to the first four titles, the player's territory can only be expanded by building an outpost in unoccupied territory. Soldiers can only be recruited in groups of six at a time, meaning the player cannot recruit any soldiers unless they have enough resources to recruit at least six.

In Paths to a Kingdom, the player's territory can be expanded in three different ways; military, technology, or trade. For neutral sectors, military expansion sees the player defeat the sector's occupants, technological expansion involves sending clerics to proselytise the occupants, and trade involves bribing the occupying soldiers. To conquer sectors occupied by enemy soldiers, the player must use the military option. For the military path, all soldiers must be assigned to a general, with each general having a specific set of skills, based around melee combat, ranged combat, attacking fortifications, or a combination of all three. Players issue orders to generals, and all soldiers under that general's command automatically follow him, with combat handled automatically by the AI. For the technology path, the player must recruit clerics, who are the only settlers capable of moving through neutral and enemy sectors. To research new technologies, the player must send the requisite number of clerics to the necessary monastery, where they will begin research. For the trade path, players must recruit traders. To unlock a trade, the player must send the requisite number of traders to the corresponding outpost, with the trade then becoming available at the marketplace.

== Development ==
=== Origins and early successes (1991-1996) ===
The original Settlers game was conceived, designed, and programmed by Blue Byte's Volker Wertich, who was inspired by titles such as Little Computer People, Populous and SimCity. Originally, he intended the game to be similar to existing god games, with early development working to that end. However, after almost a year of work, he scrapped his initial concept entirely and began work on creating a game which could simulate a complex economic system and which would feature gameplay built around a simulation of real-world supply and demand. The major innovation he introduced in The Settlers was how the game handled raw materials. In most other titles at the time, raw materials were made available without the player having to do much to produce them. In The Settlers, the player would be responsible for the raw materials upon which the economic system was built by way of constructing and maintaining each link in the chain-of-production.

Designing a game which could handle such complexity proved far from simple, requiring over two years of development and programming, with much of this time spent "teaching the computer the basic facets of running an economic system." Wertich worked on the programming of the game for a year, writing 70,000 lines of raw code, before any work began on the graphics. His biggest challenge was getting the computer to understand and accurately simulate supply and demand, which, once the necessary buildings have been constructed, is handled almost entirely outside the privy of the player. The game's project manager Stefan Piasecki explained:

Everything the human player doesn't do, the computer has to do. The people do their daily work on their own as long as the player doesn't give them orders. Essentially you have to create a computer player to aid the human player. Then you have to create a powerful computer opponent to play against; it's a lot of work for the computer as it has to manage all its little people and take military and economic considerations into account as well. As the game runs in 'real time', it can't slow down when a lot of things happen on-screen at once.

The Settlers was released in 1993 and became a surprise hit, selling far more units than Blue Byte had anticipated. With this in mind, they began developing The Settlers II. Wertich would not be involved, explaining, "after two years programming The Settlers, I didn't really want to see those little men for a while". For the sequel, Blue Byte decided to leave the gameplay relatively unchanged from the original, although they did implement a more strategic battle system, whereby players can send out scouts and utilise a stationary offensive weapon. Most of the changes were aesthetic, including graphical enhancements such as more on-screen movement and more animations for the settlers themselves. They also introduced aesthetic differentiation between the distinct races. Additionally, unlike in the first game, there is a story-driven single-player campaign. When developing this single-player story, the team initially took the concept too far, designing maps which placed tight limits on what the player could and couldn't do, and featured scripted events which would happen at certain predesignated time. They realised, however, that this went too much against the principles of the game mechanics established in the first game, betraying the tone and style of the original. Upon this realisation, they changed the map designs accordingly.

=== Evolving the brand (1996-2001) ===
Released in 1996, The Settlers II proved even more successful than the original, earning better reviews and selling considerably more units. After this success, Blue Byte pressed on with what was by now a franchise, with Wertich leading the design team for The Settlers III. This time around, his core design principle was to preserve the most popular elements of the gameplay from the first two titles, improve the graphics as much as possible, and both expand and improve upon the game mechanics. Early design decisions included the removal of the road network that was so intrinsic in the previous games; giving the different races different abilities, economic models, and buildings; making the game in high color; and integrating the 2D isometric graphics of the first two games with certain 3D graphical elements.

An early problem faced by the game's artists, Torsten Hess and Thorsten Wallner, was that the settlers themselves couldn't be too complex, as small details would be lost given their 32-pixel height, yet they had to be detailed enough to seem at least somewhat realistic. To tackle this problem, Hess and Wallner elected to exaggerate the settlers' proportions, giving them disproportionately large weapons and tools, as correctly sized implements would be too small to be seen. The settlers were also made more rotund and given enlarged heads. As all the animations in the game had to be interchangeable for every settler (walking, bending etc.), Hess and Wallner first needed to work on the skeletal animation, building an "extremely primitive skeletal settler which we could put under the visible structure of our figures". The drawback to this approach was that every individual action had to be animated separately, frame-by-frame.

Released in 1998, The Settlers III continued the series' run of commercial successes (although reviews were more mixed), and Blue Byte announced The Settlers IV at the ECTS in August 1999. However, Wertich was not working on the title, because, as he later explained, "Blue Byte wanted to have it ready for release by Christmas 2000, which, in my opinion, was not sufficient time to create a worthy title". At the E3 event in May 2000, Blue Byte cited negative feedback from fans who felt The Settlers III was too combat-orientated, and so The Settlers IV was intended as a return to the core gameplay of The Settlers and The Settlers II. Blue Byte also revealed that for the first time in the series, the game would feature a non-playable race (the Dark Tribe), the importance of whom to the overall design was addressed by project manager and co-designer Hans-Jürgen Brändle:

It will not be possible to defeat the Dark Tribe only by military means. The recultivation of the barren lands is an important component in the strategy against the dark menace and emphasizes our efforts to reposition the settling aspect of the game in the foreground. Without having to dampen any features of the military units, we have managed to find our way back to our roots.

Speaking to IGN later in the year, Brändle reiterated the designers' hopes that the game would more fully integrate economic-based settling with combat than had the previous title: "We are mainly concentrating on getting the balance between settling and fighting just right. We're introducing new features, which will make the settling part more important but will also influence the strategic fighting part. This will mean you can't concentrate on just settling, or only fighting".

In November 2000, Blue Byte announced the slated December release had been pushed back to early 2001. The game was released in Germany in February, but suffered from numerous bugs, leading to a negative reaction from fans and criticism of both the game and Blue Byte in the German gaming press. According to German magazine PC Games, 76% of players experienced technical difficulties with the release version of the game. Co-designer Thorsten Mutschall later admitted it had not been ready for release in February and should have been held back for additional playtesting and programming.

=== "Innovation leap" (2001-2004) ===
Screenshot of Heritage of Kings showing the 3D graphics and redesigned HUD

Despite the problems with its release, The Settlers IV sold well, and Blue Byte pressed on with the series. In June 2001, they revealed the next game, The Settlers: Heritage of Kings, would be a milestone in several senses - it would be the first to use 3D graphics and it would be released simultaneously for Microsoft Windows and the console market. Ultimately, the PlayStation 2 and GameCube versions never materialised. Speaking to PC Games in February 2002, the game's project manager and the series' new producer, Benedikt Grindel, explained that after The Settlers IV was criticised for being too similar to The Settlers III, Blue Byte decided that the next game should represent a "real innovation leap". He also explained that for the first time, a Settlers game was being developed with an eye to the international market, particularly North America, as the series had traditionally sold poorly outside Europe. He later said that "we wanted to make a game that worked everywhere".

Early in development, the designers decided the future of the series was not necessarily to be found in employing more races, more goods, more complex economic processes, and larger maps, but instead in streamlining the gameplay and building a set of "complex but not complicated" game mechanics. Blue Byte explained the design philosophy was to "focus more on the settlers – the characters – themselves and reduce the importance of the delivery of goods". In December 2004, with the game being criticised for not "feeling" like a Settlers title, Blue Byte addressed the differences between it and the previous games, stating that "it was important to us that The Settlers series developed, and that's why there are some changes when compared to The Settlers III and IV, such as the new graphical style, the 3D presentation, a more event-driven storyline, and the introduction of heroes".

=== Return to roots (2004-2010) ===
Despite many fans' misgivings about the feel of Heritage of Kings, it was a commercial success, outselling The Settlers IV. For their next two titles, Blue Byte looked back rather than forward, releasing two new versions of The Settlers II; a remake, The Settlers II (10th Anniversary), was released for Windows in 2006 and The Settlers DS, a 1:1 port for Nintendo DS, was released in 2007. Speaking prior to the release of 10th Anniversary, Ubisoft's business development director, Ralf Wirsing, attempted to put the overall franchise into context:

With the five parts of the series published so far, three different generations can be defined. In 1993 and 1996, with the appearance of The Settlers and The Settlers II, the foundation was laid for the success of the series. This first generation offers a unique mix of development strategy and economic simulation, and has been a guiding principle for the entire genre. The second generation was with parts III and IV, which gave the settlers their cuddly image. With The Settlers: Heritage of Kings, came the first in the third generation of games.

In an October 2006 press release, Ubisoft explained that for the next entry in the main series, The Settlers: Rise of an Empire, the designers had been working to identify "the Settler gene"; that quintessential component or components which make the Settlers series unique. Grindel explained that the design philosophy behind the game was "to understand the Settlers series in its entirety", whilst co-designer Andreas Suika said that "we're taking something from all the Settlers parts, and making the best Settlers there can be". At Ubisoft's Ubidays event in July 2007, Grindel reiterated: "We really wanted to grab the essence of what people like about the different games, to make one Settlers game that really summarises what the series is about".

Blue Byte made sure to address the reaction to Heritage of Kings, assuring fans that Rise would be a very different type of game. Suika stated, "if you look at Heritage of Kings, and develop the series consistently from that point, we would have a pure RTS with no economy. And we don't want that. There are many people who say there was too much fighting in Settlers 5, and we agree. We want to reduce this in favour of economic-based gameplay". On the same subject, Grindel opined, "we strayed too far from the basic concept of The Settlers". Hoping to rectify this with Rise of an Empire, he explained that, for the first time in the series, combat is "not the ultimate goal of each map".

The next release in the series was Die Siedler: Aufbruch der Kulturen, a 2008 German-only spiritual successor to 10th Anniversary featuring very similar gameplay. Speaking prior to its release, Ronald Kaulbach, Ubisoft's International Brand Manager spoke about that project:

We want to provide clarity for Settlers fans and show what kind of gaming experience they get with which Settlers title. There is the "Traditional" series, which includes the new game Aufbruch der Kulturen, as well as the previously released titles The Settlers II (10th Anniversary), and the Nintendo DS re-release of the original Settlers II. These traditional games feature the style of older Settlers titles. There is also the "Evolutionary" series, which features games containing new styles of gameplay and state-of-the-art graphics.

Developed by Gameloft, the next entry in the franchise was The Settlers HD, a 2009 handheld remake of The Settlers IV, released for multiple operating systems. The next game was the seventh entry in the main series, The Settlers 7: Paths to a Kingdom. In the early stages of development, Blue Byte looked at the two previous games, Heritage of Kings and Rise of an Empire, both of which had been unpopular with fans, to see why they didn't work as Settlers titles. Whilst Heritage had gone too far in the direction of real-time strategy, with far more emphasis on combat than city-building, Rise had restored the centrality of city-building, but also featured a significantly simpler economic model than any previous title in the series, with little focus on the daisy-chain economic processes upon which the first four Settlers titles were built. In the lead-up to the release of Paths to a Kingdom, Grindel admitted, "with Settlers 5 and 6, we lost many loyal fans, despite having a larger base target group."

With this in mind, the designers looked both forward and backwards - introducing new game mechanics such as a Victory Points system and greatly improving the graphics, but also going back to, for example, The Settlers II for the centrality of building a good road network and The Settlers III for the complexity of the production chains. Lead designer Andreas Nitsche explained that the importance of the Victory Point system would mean combat is no longer more important than economic micromanagement: "It's always been a pity that behind every fish that was caught, every iron ingot that was cast, there was only one motivation - to fight the enemy. This situation has been changed by the Victory Point system. Now there are many ways to use your economy to win, not just totally annihilating the enemy; now, economic competition for technologies, trading posts, or land can lead to victory". Blue Byte also hired Bruce Shelley, co-designer of Railroad Tycoon and Civilization, and lead designer on the first three Age of Empires games, as a design consultant on Paths to a Kingdom, specifically with an eye to making the game more appealing to a North American market and correcting some of the perceived problems with Heritage of Kings and Rise of an Empire.

=== Anteria and New Allies (2010-2023) ===
The Settlers: Kingdoms of Anteria was announced in June 2014, with Blue Byte citing it as "the most innovative Settlers game we have ever created". In August, Ubisoft released the first screenshots and revealed that the game would be a combination of city-building and action role-playing. At Gamescom that month, lead designer Guido Schmidt touted the game's economic system, which he explained was the most complex in the franchise's history, with some of the more advanced economic processes involving up to 19 buildings. Discussing the differentiation between combat missions and city-building, he said the designers were acting on feedback from fans, who disliked being under pressure whilst they tried to build up their city, as that city could be attacked at any time. With this in mind, Blue Byte decided to completely divorce combat from city-building, structuring the combat more in the vein of a dungeon crawler than the kind of real-time strategy combat seen in previous titles.

A German closed beta began in August and an international beta in September. However, by late October, it had become apparent that the beta was generating predominantly negative feedback from both fans and journalists. Many found the combat gameplay too similar to Diablo, and criticised the repetitiveness of the missions, chaotic fights, a non-rotatable camera, and poor AI. There was also an especially strong feeling that the game didn't feel like a Settlers title. In January 2015, Ubisoft abruptly ended the beta several months early. In a statement on the game's official forums, they said that "this step is unusual but necessary so that we can fully concentrate on modifications, new content, and solutions to known problems. Many upcoming changes are based on the huge amount of valuable feedback that has been collected to date". Little more was heard about the game until April 2016, when Blue Byte published an open letter on their forums, explaining that Kingdoms of Anteria would be released in August, albeit no longer as a Settlers title, with the new name of Champions of Anteria, and with redesigned gameplay.

At Gamescom in 2018, Ubisoft announced the eighth title in the main series. Initially, named simply The Settlers, it was intended as a reboot of sorts, and was originally slated for release in 2019, then rescheduled for the third quarter of 2020, but in July, the game's release was postponed indefinitely and preorders were refunded. In January 2022, Ubisoft revealed that the game was nearing completion and was scheduled for release in March of that year. However, the game's closed beta received highly negative feedback. Acting on this feedback, Ubisoft announced in early March that the game was postponed until "a later date." In November 2022, they revealed the game had a new title (The Settlers: New Allies) and was slated for release in February 2023. They also revealed that for the first time in the series' history, a Settlers game would be a multi-platform title, with plans to release the game on the Nintendo Switch, PlayStation 4, PlayStation 5, Xbox One and Xbox Series X/S. The PC version of the game released in February 2023 as planned, with all other versions releasing in July.

== Reception ==
Aggregate review scores
Game	Year	GameRankings	Metacritic
The Settlers II	1996	84%	
The Settlers III	1998	71%	
The Settlers IV	2001		74/100
The Settlers: Heritage of Kings	2004		58/100
The Settlers II (10th Anniversary)	2006	74%	
The Settlers DS	2007		39/100
The Settlers: Rise of an Empire	2007		66/100
The Settlers HD	2009		73/100 (iOS)
The Settlers 7: Paths to a Kingdom	2010		79/100
The Settlers: New Allies	2023		55/100

The Settlers games have received reviews ranging from very positive to very negative.

The original game received positive reviews, with critics especially praising the complexity of the economic system and the interrelatedness of the various buildings. Amiga User International called it "a true masterpiece". CU Amiga's Tony Dillon argued that "there are so many variations on the basic game, that you will wonder if you could ever play the same game twice". Computer Gaming World's Robert L. Hayes, Jr. called it "the most realistic medieval economic model ever built into a computer system", although he found combat "dull and predictable".

The Settlers II received very positive reviews, with critics especially praising the gameplay, the economic system, and the graphics. PC Games' Petra Maueröder called it "world class". PC Player's Jörg Langer wrote "there is no more constructive, more relaxing strategy game". On the other hand, GameSpot's Trent Ward called combat "snore-inducing."

The Settlers III received mixed reviews. Whilst the economic system was praised, most critics felt the game was too similar to previous Settlers titles. PC Gamer's James Flynn called the economic system "perfectly designed". PC Games' Petra Maueröder wrote "the depth of the game is immense", although she was critical of the single-player campaign and poor pathfinding. GameRevolution's Mark Cooke lauded the "level of complexity". On the other hand, GameSpot's Ron Dulin argued that it played almost identically to The Settlers II, citing "surface changes [which] make only a moderate improvement". Next Generation called the game "a disappointment, lacking the creativity needed to compete in today's overcrowded RTS market".

The Settlers IV received mixed reviews, with most critics feeling it was too similar to The Settlers III, and many opining that Blue Byte had failed to steer the gameplay away from an over-reliance on combat. Although the graphics and animations were generally praised, the AI, mission variety, and combat were criticised. PC Player's Damian Knaus was critical of the lack of any "real innovations". PC Games' Rüdiger Steidle wrote that "Blue Byte has not altered the concept at all". IGN's Dan Adams criticised the similarities to The Settlers III, writing, "it's hard to tell this is really a new game". GameSpot's Ron Dulin called it "just the same old game with the same old problems".

Heritage of Kings received mixed reviews, with many critics arguing the graphical changes, streamlining of micromanagement, and foregrounding of combat stripped the game of the unique Settlers identity. PC Games' Petra Fröhlich argued it was a Settlers game in name only, noting "economic cycles are virtually non-existent". Eurogamer's Kieron Gillen called it "brutally average". Computer Gaming World's Erik Wolpaw felt the game featured nothing to distinguish it from late '90s real-time strategy titles.

The Settlers II (10th Anniversary) received mixed reviews. Whilst the graphics and sound effects were generally praised, and the designers were lauded for retaining so much of the original game's mechanics, some critics felt it was too reverential to the original, and, as a result, seemed dated. Gameswelt's André Linken lamented the designers' "unwillingness to restructure" the repetitive mission goals of the original, although VideoGamer.com's Paul Devlin called it a "lovingly crafted remake".

The Settlers DS received a very negative reaction, with critics citing unresponsive controls, a poorly implemented HUD, and, especially, game-breaking bugs. IGN's Jack Devries criticised it as "not even a functional game". GameSpot's Kevin VanOrd called it "a buggy mess". Pocket Gamer's Mark Walbank found the number of bugs "staggering". Eurogamer's Dan Whitehead called it "one of the most clumsy and broken games to [ever] receive a commercial release".

Rise of an Empire received mixed reviews, with many critics finding the streamlined gameplay too simplistic, and the overall game lacking depth. Although the graphics were praised, the mission design, AI, and single-player storyline were criticised. PC Games' Petra Fröhlich argued that it didn't seem to matter what the player does, as "even the worst settlement somehow runs fine". GameSpy's Allen Rausch found it "decidedly mediocre." IGN's Dan Adams called the economic model "simple to the extreme". On the other hand, GameSpot's Brett Todd called it "the most fulfilling game in the series".

The Settlers HD received positive reviews, and was lauded for replicating the original game on a portable device, and for successfully adapting the controls to a touchscreen. The most common criticism concerned the lack of free play and multiplayer modes. AppSpy's Andrew Nesvadba said the iOS version "is everything great about strategy games". Arron Hirst of 148Apps called it "both immersive and addicting". Pocket Gamer's Tracy Erickson praised the "deep economic strategy gameplay". Pocket Gamer's Brendan Caldwell called the Android version "an almost resounding victory" and praised "a depth not often enjoyed by Android titles".

Paths to a Kingdom received positive reviews, with many critics citing it as the best Settlers game since The Settlers II. Especially lauded were the graphics, Victory Points system, mission variety, and map design. PC Games' Christian Schlütter called it "the best Settlers game in a long time". Eurogamer's Quintin Smith found it "ungodly compelling". GameSpot's Kevin VanOrd cited it as "the series' most charming to date".

=== Sales ===
The games in The Settlers series have generally sold well, especially in their native Germany.

By June 1996, the original game had sold over 215,000 units worldwide across both Amiga and MS-DOS, well beyond Blue Byte's expectations. By May 1998, it had sold over 400,000 units. The Settlers II sold even better, and by May 1998, it had sold over 600,000 units worldwide. By April 1999, The Settlers III's global sales had surpassed 600,000 units, of which nearly 400,000 were sold in Germany. By June 2000, it had sold over 700,000 units worldwide. The Settlers IV was 2001's highest selling German-developed game, and by August 2002, it had sold over 300,000 units domestically. By July 2006, Heritage of Kings had sold over 500,000 units worldwide, with 350,000 sold in Germany. Rise of an Empire was the highest selling German-developed game of 2007.

By March 2001, the series as a whole had sold just under 3 million units in total. By June 2002, that number had increased to 3.5 million; by March 2004, it had reached 5 million; by August 2008, it exceeded 6 million; by September 2009, it reached 8 million; and by September 2014, it had topped 10 million units.

=== Awards ===
Year	Publication or ceremony	Game	Award	Result	Ref.
1994	Amiga Joker	The Settlers	Best Game	Won	
1994	Amiga Joker	The Settlers	Best Strategic Game	Won	
1996	Computer Games Strategy Plus	The Settlers II	Real-Time Strategy Game of the Year	Nominated	
2000	Eltern	The Settlers III	"Giga-Maus"	Won	
2004	Games Convention	The Settlers: Heritage of Kings	Best PC Game	Won	
2004	Games Convention	The Settlers: Heritage of Kings	Best PC Graphics	Nominated	
2005	Deutscher Entwicklerpreis	The Settlers: Heritage of Kings	Best Strategy Game	Won	
2005	Deutscher Entwicklerpreis	The Settlers: Heritage of Kings	Best Cutscenes	Won	
2005	Deutscher Entwicklerpreis	The Settlers: Heritage of Kings - Expansion Disc	Best PC Add-on	Nominated	
2007	Deutscher Entwicklerpreis	The Settlers: Rise of an Empire	Best German Game	Won	
2007	Deutscher Entwicklerpreis	The Settlers: Rise of an Empire	Best Level Design	Won	
2007	Deutscher Entwicklerpreis	The Settlers: Rise of an Empire	Best Interface	Won	
2007	Deutscher Entwicklerpreis	The Settlers: Rise of an Empire	Best Cutscenes	Won	
2007	Deutscher Entwicklerpreis	The Settlers: Rise of an Empire	Best Graphics	Won	
2007	Deutscher Entwicklerpreis	The Settlers: Rise of an Empire	Best Score	Won	
2007	Deutscher Kindersoftwarepreis	The Settlers: Rise of an Empire	TOMMI	Won	
2010	BÄM! Awards	The Settlers 7: Paths to a Kingdom	Best AI	Won	
2010	Red Dot Design Awards	The Settlers 7: Paths to a Kingdom	"Best of the Best"	Won	
2010	Deutscher Entwicklerpreis	The Settlers 7: Paths to a Kingdom	Best German Game	Won	
2010	Deutscher Entwicklerpreis	The Settlers 7: Paths to a Kingdom	Best Strategy Game	Won	
