= Champions of Anteria =

2016 action role-playing video game

- Developer(s): Blue Byte
- Publisher(s): Ubisoft
- Director(s): Mihnea Dragoman
- Producer(s): Lukáš Kuře
- Designer(s): Christian Hagedorn
- Programmer(s): Daniel Balster; Osama Zaqout
- Artist(s): Edgar Bittencourt
- Writer(s): Iain Lowson
- Composer(s): Jeff Broadbent; Dynamedion
- Platform(s): Windows
- Release: WW: August 30, 2016
- Genre(s): Action role-playing
- Mode(s): Single-player

Champions of Anteria is a 2016 action role-playing game for Windows. Developed by Blue Byte and published by Ubisoft, it was released in August 2016. In October, Blue Byte released two DLC packs; The Alchemist and The Beastmaster, featuring new characters and buildings.

The game tells the story of Anteria, a once-prosperous kingdom that has fallen into disarray and factionalism. Beset by enemies on all sides, each attempting to gain control of the kingdom, the people of Anteria turn to a group of champions - native Anterians who have recently returned after many years away. The champions agree to help but soon find themselves in conflict with Kalen Daark, a powerful black mage with his own evil agenda.

Originally intended for a 2014 release as the eighth entry in The Settlers series, the game was announced as The Settlers: Kingdoms of Anteria. Championed by Blue Byte and Ubisoft as the most innovative title in the series to date, it was set to feature a mixture of city-building, economic micromangement, real-time strategy, and action-role playing. However, after the closed beta produced predominately negative feedback, especially in terms of how the game didn't "feel" like a Settlers title, Ubisoft scrapped the project. Nothing more was heard of it until 2016 when it re-emerged as a new property entirely, unrelated to the Settlers series and with a new title. Keeping most of the art assets and maintaining the tone and broad storyline of Kingdoms, Blue Byte had completely reworked the gameplay by removing most of the city-building and economic elements and focusing instead on the action role-playing combat missions.

Champions of Anteria received mixed reviews. The graphics, voice acting, and humour were generally praised, and some critics found the integration of city-building and action role-playing well handled. Others, however, criticised the game as being neither one thing nor the other, with both the city-building and the combat lacking sufficient depth. Many critics were also unimpressed with the AI, especially in relation to pathfinding, and there was a general consensus that the combat missions were unacceptably repetitive.

== Gameplay ==
Champions of Anteria is made up of three main gameplay components - world map, city base, and combat missions.

=== World map ===
The world map is divided into 26 territories, one of which is the player's city base. At the commencement of the game, some of the territories are neutral and some are owned by one of the three factions opposing the player. To complete the game, the player must own every territory on the world map. To defeat an opposing faction permanently, the player must conquer their city base, which is guarded by a boss and can only be accessed after all territories belonging to that particular faction have been captured. Players can only attack territories immediately adjacent to territories they already own, and when an opposing faction attacks the player's territory, the player has one day (in game-time) to prepare before they must play a defensive mission. If the player wins, the attack is repelled, and the player retains the territory. If they lose, the territory will be captured by the opposing faction. The game is not over, however, until an opposing faction captures the player's city base territory.

The game is played in 'turns', with the player and all opposing factions allowed to attack one territory per day. Playing a defensive mission also constitutes a turn, meaning the player cannot play both a defensive and an offensive mission on the same day. Enemy factions are fully automated and pursue their own objectives, levelling up their city bases independently of what the player is doing elsewhere on the map. In this way, an enemy faction might attack a player-owned territory, a neutral territory, or a territory owned by one of the other factions.

Captured territories can be enhanced by the construction of trading posts and fortifications within each territory. Trading posts increase the amount of gold and renown generated by a given territory each day, whilst fortifications delay an attack by a set amount of time.

=== City base ===
Screenshot of Champions of Anteria, showing the city base HUD. The border of the current sector is highlighted in white, and this sector already has several buildings. A newly added building (highlighted in white) illustrates the importance of slots – the player can only build in predetermined slots, of which there are a limited number per sector.

The player's city base is where the player gathers resources, constructs buildings, researches new technologies, forges weaponry and armour, and mixes potions. The city base generates a certain amount of resources each day, depending on what resource collection buildings and how many of each the player has built. As the game progresses, the player can also build one-off buildings - an apothecary to create potions for healing, enhancing stats, and inflicting damage; a magister machinae to create stationary offensive weaponry and healing zones; a blacksmith to forge new weaponry and armour; and a market to trade resources for gold. The Alchemist DLC added an additional one-off building, the "Foundry of Affinities", which allows the player to brew five types of new hybrid potions using a combination of resources.

To ensure they have enough residents to populate the various buildings, the player must construct residences, whilst to expand their base into additional sectors within the city base territory, the player must build a watchtower within that sector. Watchtowers can only be constructed when the player has access to a "brave person". The only way to attain brave people is by spending a certain amount of renown on the upgrade tree, which is where the player enhances their abilities, unlocks new buildings, and improves the available offers in the apothecary, machinae, and smith. Renown can only be earned by conquering territories, with each territory granting a certain amount of renown per day.

The player can level up their city base only by spending renown on the upgrade tree. Levelling up encompasses both the player's castle and every champion in their roster, so players don't need to level up each champion individually. At every second level of upgrade, the player can unlock two new skills for each of their champions.

=== Combat ===
Screenshot showing the combat HUD. On the right of the screen is the mini-map, below which is the objective list, whilst on the bottom left is the elemental affinity wheel. The image also shows the player's four item slots as well as the currently selected champion's action queue at the bottom of the screen. The queue currently contains three actions.

In the original game, players could command five champions each with their own elemental alignment and weapon; Vargus wields a broadsword and is skilled with metal, Anslem is a magic user skilled with lightning, Nusala uses a bow-and-arrow and is skilled with nature, Oona wields dual-swords and is skilled with water, and Baltasar uses a gun and is skilled with fire. The two DLC packs added two additional champions - Tarn, a brawler skilled with both metal and nature, and Weissle, a mage who can combine any three of the five elements into a hybrid magic. Each champion also has access to attacks of a different element than their base element - Nusala, for example, can use fire-arrows, whilst Vargus can do a spinning water-based attack.

For each combat mission, whether offensive or defensive, the player must pick three champions. Prior to a mission, the player is told the elemental alignment of the majority of that territory's enemies, allowing the player to plan strategically in choosing their champions. The game uses a "rock paper scissors"-style wheel to determine which element is strong against which other element - fire is strong against metal, metal against nature, nature against lightning, lightning against water, and water against fire. If a champion's alignment is strong against the alignment of an enemy, they will inflict 135% normal damage; on the other hand, if the enemy's alignment is strong against the champion, the champion will inflict only 65% damage.

An important gameplay element is "Active Pause Mode", wherein the player can pause the game, but continue to enter commands, which the champions will carry out when the game is unpaused. It is possible to queue up to four commands per champion.

Each champion has 13 learnable skills, but only eight can be learned on a single play-through, as every time the player learns a skill, they lose access to another skill. Of the eight skills, four can be taken into battle at any one time. These skills have various effects, such as stat boosts, extra damage, healing, or temporarily altering the elemental affinities of enemies or allies. The player also has four inventory slots each of which can store a set number of potions and/or weaponry created in the machinae.

== Plot ==
The game begins as a trio of native Anterians return to their homeland after many years away - Vargus, a former Sergeant-at-Arms in the Crown Legion who became a mercenary for hire when the Legion was disbanded; Anslem, a warrior monk who was cast out of his tribe when he became a vegetarian; and Nusala, a desert warrior who decided she didn't like sand. Finding Anteria overrun with bandits led by a man named Randal, they head to a nearby town, where they encounter a local named Bryan who asks the trio if they can drive the bandits away. They agree, and the following day, they defeat and imprison Randal.

As the champions celebrate, however, Bryan reveals that Randal and his gang weren't really bandits, they were guards working for a powerful dark mage named Kalen Daark, who is planning something evil, although Bryan doesn't know what. He explains that various groups are attempting to take control of Anteria and asks the trio if they will help defend the kingdom. With that in mind, he introduces them to General Fidelus, commander of Anteria's army. Again, the champions agree to help.

Setting out, they face several foes - the Dune Tribe, a once peaceful people from the deserts to the west, who have recently begun to attack Anteria without explanation; the Frostbeards, a warlike race from the frozen east, once made up of numerous hostile tribes, but who have recently been united under new leadership; and the Broken Crown, the remnants of the Crown Legion, who have been secretly rebuilding their strength in the mountains to the north. Along the way, the trio are joined by four other champions - Oona, known as the "Bladestorm", she once fought against Vargus, impressing him to such an extent that he invited her to join them; Baltasar, a mercenary for hire with an out-of-control ego who heard of the conflict and assumed the champions would be happy for his help; Weissle, a clumsy but powerful mage; and Tarn, a brawler known for his affinity for animals.

Upon venturing into Dune Tribe territory, the champions discover the oases upon which the Tribe depend have become infused with magical poison, and a mysterious djinn has told the Tribe's leader, Queen Nuaba, that the origin of the magic is Anteria, upon whom she declares war. Fighting their way through to her, they beat her in combat and release her from the power of the djinn, after which she calls off the offensive against Anteria. Facing off against the Frostbeards, the champions encounter a massive humanoid creature controlled by a small magician. They learn that some time prior, the magician Kenstrid was appointed senior advisor to the king, Bryndt Jodenson. The two then disappeared for several weeks and when they returned, Bryndt had been transformed into the creature; a lumbering brute completely under the control of Kenstrid. The champions fight and defeat the duo, killing Bryndt, who is given an honourable funeral by the Frostbeard clans as they call off their attacks on Anteria. Advancing on the Broken Crown, the champions learn they are led by Fendrel, Vargus's older brother and the man responsible for disbanding the Crown Legion. Attacking his keep, the champions defeat him and the Broken Crown surrenders.

As the champions and Anterians celebrate, they quickly learn that Daark was secretly using the Dune Tribe, Frostbeards, and Broken Legion to distract the champions so they wouldn't notice him manoeuvring his Daark Cult towards his ultimate goal - to end all life; revenge for his banishment from this plane of existence centuries earlier. The champions storm Daark's fortress, but he transports them into the Unliving Dimension where he reveals his true form - a powerful dragon. Nevertheless, the champions are able to defeat him, and back in this reality, just as the Daark Cult gain the upper hand against Fidelus's army, Daark's defeat causes his followers to turn to ash, thus liberating the kingdom.

== Development ==
=== Kingdoms of Anteria ===
The game was originally announced in June 2014, under the title The Settlers: Kingdoms of Anteria, the eight entry in the city-building and real-time strategy franchise, The Settlers. Blue Byte's Director of Product Development, Christopher Schmitz, said of the game, "by reinventing our approach to the franchise, The Settlers: Kingdoms of Anteria offers players a brand new experience full of new possibilities to explore. Without a doubt, this is the most innovative Settlers game we have ever created". In August, Ubisoft released the first screenshots and revealed that the game would be a combination of city-building and action role-playing, with the combat sections likened to the Diablo series or a MOBA.

At this stage of development, the supply and demand-based city-building gameplay was similar to previous Settlers titles, involving economic micromangement, constructing and upgrading buildings, researching new technologies, and gathering resources, with an emphasis on building up a robust economic model, managing daisy-chain economic processes, navigating technology trees, and improving the player's settlement. An innovation in the basic Settlers gameplay at this time was that when the player constructs a building, it is no longer automatically linked to other buildings or automatically assigned a role. So, for example, when the player builds a lumberjack, nothing will happen until the player manually assigns the occupant a section of forest in which to work. Similarly, when the player builds a sawmill, it doesn't automatically form an economic chain with the lumberjack. Instead, the player must manually link the buildings, with each building capable of being linked with only one other building - so if the player has more than one sawmill and lumberjack, they must choose how to set up the buildings' interactions. This was to be the case for production chains involving two buildings or many buildings - everything must be manually linked by the player, allowing a level of control not yet seen in the franchise.

In July 2014, Blue Byte revealed that players would need to remain online while playing; if the network connection is lost, the game will automatically pause until the connection is re-established. This proved to be a controversial announcement, with fans and journalists referring to Ubisoft's disastrous rollout of their 2010 digital rights management system, the Online Services Platform, which rendered The Settlers 7: Paths to a Kingdom unplayable for thousands of players across the globe. In an October interview with PC Games, Guido Schmidt, then lead designer, defended the decision to make the game only playable whilst the player is online:

The reason for this lies in our intention to create a long-term, cooperative experience. We want players to cooperate with each other over a longer period of time, go on adventures together, and do business. This was a brave decision when we started the project - we were aware of that. But we didn't want to make another classic Settlers game - we wanted to create something really new and innovative instead. Hence the new game structure. A lot has happened since the release of The Settlers 7. Last but not least, we've also received feedback from The Settlers Online players who encouraged us to develop a pure online PC game.

At Gamescom in August, Schmidt revealed that unlike in previous Settlers titles, the player would have only one city, which they develop throughout the game, rather than having to build a new city every level. He also touted the game's economic system, which he stated was the most complex in the franchise's history, with some of the more advanced economic processes involving up to 19 buildings. Discussing the differentiation between combat missions and city-building, Schmidt said the designers were acting on feedback from fans, who disliked being under pressure whilst they tried to build up their city, as that city could be attacked at any time. With this in mind, Blue Byte decided to completely divorce combat from city-building, structuring the combat more in the vein of a dungeon crawler than the kind of real-time strategy combat seen in previous titles.

The German closed beta began on August 20 and the international beta on September 16. However, by late October, it had become apparent that the beta was generating predominantly negative feedback from both fans and journalists. Many found the combat gameplay too similar to Diablo games, and criticised the repetitiveness of the missions, the necessity for grinding, the high difficulty level, an unclear tutorial, chaotic fights, non-rotatable camera, and poor AI. They were also highly critical of the game's use of real-world money to speed up construction, buy resources, and expand inventory slots, with many opining that the game felt like a free-to-play title, even though it was full price. There was also a strong feeling that the game didn't feel like a Settlers title.

In his PC Games interview in October, Schmidt said that based on feedback received during the beta, the combat portions of the game, which originally made up roughly 75% of gameplay would be scaled back to around 50%; players would level up faster, giving them access to more buildings and abilities earlier in a playthrough; the default difficulty level would be lowered; AI would be improved; and the tutorial would be expanded. He also reiterated that the use of real-world money would not be removed and wait times for construction and resource collection would not be reduced.

In January 2015, Ubisoft abruptly ended the beta several months early. In a statement on the game's official forums, they stated: "This step is unusual but necessary so that we can fully concentrate on modifications, new content, and solutions to known problems. Many upcoming changes are based on the huge amount of valuable feedback that has been collected to date". They also promised that there would be "information coming in the near future".

=== Champions of Anteria ===
However, nothing more was heard of the game, and when it wasn't featured at Gamescom 2015 in August, many speculated that it may not be released at all. By February 2016, most journalists had concluded that the game had been cancelled, despite no word from either Blue Byte or Ubisoft confirming or denying a cancellation. However, in April 2016, Blue Byte published an open letter on the game's forum and Facebook page explaining that Kingdoms of Anteria would be released in August, albeit no longer as a Settlers title, with the new name of Champions of Anteria, and with redesigned gameplay:

After much discussion, we made the decision to steer this project in a new direction, meaning The Settlers: Kingdoms of Anteria as you know it no longer exists. However, we are excited to announce that we have been working hard to create a new game, a challenging real-time strategy experience that we are revealing to you today, Champions of Anteria. To be clear, the game isn't part of The Settlers series, but a new adventure.

They went on to talk about the style of the game and how it differed from titles in The Settlers series: "With a renewed focus on story, the economic and logistic features are revised and are handled via a homebase management system where you can craft items for your Champions and unlock new abilities". They also stated, "for those who are wondering about the classic Settlers series, rest assured that The Settlers is alive and kicking!" With the negative criticism of the closed beta in mind, Blue Byte had restructured the game entirely, all but removing city-building and economic micromanagement, whilst streamlining the game into a single-player only title.

== Reception ==
Reception

Aggregate score
Aggregator	Score
Metacritic	67/100

Review scores
Publication	Score
4Players	77%
Eurogamer	7/10
GameStar	59/100
IGN	7.8/10 (ITL); 7.2/10 (ES)
PC Games (DE)	6/10
The Games Machine	4.8/10

Champions of Anteria received "mixed or average reviews", with a score of 67 out of 100 on Metacritic, based on twenty reviews.

IGN.it's Francesco Destri scored the game 7.8 out of 10, praising the "almost perfect alternation between the action-RPG and the more reflective management-style sections". He also lauded the graphics, voice-acting, and humour. Although he criticised the repetitiveness of the combat missions and the dearth of any degree of stealth gameplay, he concluded that "Blue Byte has managed to combine management, RTS and role play à la Diablo in a convincing way".

4players's Dieter Schmidt scored it 77%, praising the graphics, the integration of action role-playing and city-building, and the use of Active Pause Mode, and calling the game "addictive". In terms of criticisms, he found the combat missions repetitive and the AI's pathfinding poorly implemented and occasionally buggy. Nevertheless, he concluded that "at its core, Champions of Anteria does a lot of things right, it knows how to entertain, and it evokes memories of Baldur's Gate".

IGN.es's Jose A. Rodríguez scored it 7.2 out of 10. He praised the comedy elements and voice-acting but was critical of the graphics, particularly the similarity in the aesthetic design from map to map. Although he acknowledged the game wasn't especially original, he enjoyed playing it, concluding, "Champions of Anteria manages to bring together various genres and revive the essence of The Settlers. It doesn't try anything new, but it knows how to mix the elements".

Eurogamer.it's Daniele Cucchiarelli scored it 7 out of 10. He praised the graphics but was critical of the repetition in the combat missions, calling the game "an interesting hybrid experiment that can be considered successful, but not completely".

PC Games' Matti Sandqvist scored it 6 out of 10. He praised the graphics, but was critical of the combat missions' repetitiveness and what he perceived as the redundancy of the rock-paper-scissors elemental alignment system. He was also critical of the limited variety of enemies, the lack of AI tactics, poor AI pathfinding ("the champions' insane routes are among the worst I've seen since Command & Conquer"), and the implementation of Active Pause Mode ("often the champions "forget" their orders and simply stand still - even if they are attacked)". He concluded that "due to the many small mistakes, I got the feeling that the developers may have lacked time to optimise the game sufficiently".

GameStar's Sascha Penzhorn scored it 59 out of 100. Although he lauded the graphics, he was highly critical of the game's repetitiveness, writing, "it is unforgivable when missions repeat themselves 1:1 after three or four hours of play". He was also critical of the elemental alignment system, arguing that it "doesn't bring any tactical depth". Although he enjoyed the city-building sections of the game, he found they didn't alleviate the boredom of the combat missions, opining that "you could completely throw the combat out and make the building sections a decent Settlers title".

The Games Machine's Daniele Dolce scored it 4.8 out of 10. He too was very critical of the repetitiveness of the combat missions, writing, "regardless of the territory attacked, missions with identical objectives always take place in the same way, with the same scenario map and the same enemy positioning". He was also critical of the city-building, finding it "so diluted that it has completely lost its effectiveness". He concluded by calling the game "boring, repetitive, and strategically irrelevant".

== Downloadable content ==
Champions of Anteria received two DLC packs, both released in October 2016. The first, The Alchemist, introduced a new building (The Foundry of Affinities) for brewing five types of hybrid potions, and a new champion - Weissle the Alchemist, a mage capable of combining any three elements into a multi-elemental spell. The second pack, The Beastmaster, introduced another new champion - Tarn the Beastmaster, a brawler with both metal and nature alignments.
