= The Settlers: Rise of an Empire =

2007 city-building and real-time strategy video game

- European cover art
- Developer: Blue Byte
- Publisher: Ubisoft
- Producer: Benedikt Grindel
- Designers: Alex Brüggemann; Andreas Suika
- Programmer: Dietmar Meschede
- Artist: Thorsten Mutschall
- Writer: Jeff Grubb
- Composer: Michael Pummel
- Series: The Settlers
- Engine: RenderWare
- Platform: Windows
- Release: WW: September 28, 2007
- Genres: City-building, real-time strategy
- Modes: Single-player, multiplayer

The Settlers: Rise of an Empire (German: Die Siedler: Aufstieg eines Königreichs) is a 2007 city-building game with real-time strategy elements for Windows. Developed by Blue Byte and published by Ubisoft, it was released worldwide in September 2007. It is the sixth game in The Settlers series. In March 2008, Blue Byte released an expansion, The Settlers: Rise of an Empire - The Eastern Realm (German: Die Siedler: Aufstieg eines Königreichs - Reich des Ostens), featuring new single-player campaign missions, new maps for both single-player and multiplayer modes, and an enhanced map editor. In September, they released The Settlers: Rise of an Empire - Gold Edition, containing the original game plus the Eastern Realm expansion, and additional single and multiplayer maps. The Gold Edition was also released on Steam and Uplay. In 2015, it was released on GOG.com, and in 2018, it was re-released as The Settlers: Rise of an Empire - History Edition.

The game's single-player campaign is set in the same fictional universe as The Settlers: Heritage of Kings, albeit many centuries after the events of that game. The player takes on the role of a king trying to re-unite the once prosperous, but now war-torn and divided Darion Empire. Joined by a group of loyal knights, he is opposed by the Red Prince, a dictator determined to be crowned emperor, and the Prince's senior-most general, Crimson Sabatt. The Eastern Realm takes place several months later, with the king and his knights slowly re-uniting the Empire. However, when they receive a plea for help from a distant kingdom, they find themselves facing powerful new enemies; a woman claiming to be a goddess, the cult that follows her, and the cities that serve her.

Early in development, the game's designers set out to identify the "Settler gene"; that quintessential component or components which make the Settlers series unique. Having done so, they elected to combine some of the more popular game mechanics from previous titles in the series; the road network from The Settlers and The Settlers II; expansion by means of military outposts from The Settlers, The Settlers II, The Settlers III and The Settlers IV; a correlation between military strength and the prosperity of one's city from The Settlers IV; and heroes, taxation, and soldier's salary from Heritage of Kings. Feeling that Heritage took the series too far from its city-building origins and more in the direction of a traditional combat-based real-time strategy, the designers scaled back the importance, frequency, and difficulty of combat. Similarly, wanting to streamline and re-focus the gameplay, they also simplified the economic model, removing micromanagement and complicated daisy-chain economic processes.

Rise of an Empire received mixed reviews, with many critics finding the streamlined gameplay too simplistic, and the overall game lacking depth. Although the graphics were generally praised, the mission design, AI, and single-player storyline were criticised, with reviewers comparing the game unfavourably to previous Settlers titles, and games such as Anno 1701. Rise of an Empire was a commercial success, selling over 200,000 units in Germany during its first two months of release. At the 2007 Deutscher Entwicklerpreis, it won six awards, including "Best German Game", the first game in the Settlers series to do so.

== Gameplay ==
The Settlers: Rise of an Empire is a city-building game with real-time strategy elements, controlled via a point and click interface. On each map, the player is required to accomplish certain predetermined goals by building a settlement with a functioning economy. To achieve this end, the player must construct and upgrade buildings, manage taxation and soldiers' pay, ensure workers' wants and needs are attended to, and gather resources. Although the game is loosely built around the same supply and demand-based gameplay as seen in previous Settlers titles, the game mechanics are substantially different. Featuring a significantly simpler economic model than any previous game in the series, there is less focus on micromanagement and daisy-chain economic processes, and more on upgrading buildings, evolving the player's settlement, and maintaining a high standard of living. Military recruitment has also been greatly simplified, and the importance of combat in general has been reduced.

=== Game modes ===
The game can be played in one of two modes; single-player or multiplayer. In single-player mode, the player can play either campaign missions or individual non-campaign games. In campaign mode, the player must complete a series of missions, each featuring multiple objectives, the majority of which are based around achieving specific economic targets, reaching a certain level of promotion, or fulfilling trade requests. Although all maps feature at least one computer controlled opponent, objectives based around combat are less common. Most maps also feature several optional missions. In the original release of the game, there were sixteen campaign missions. The Eastern Realm expansion added a new campaign of eight missions.

In non-campaign single-player and multiplayer modes, which can be played via a LAN or online, the player picks a map on which to play, with each map featuring different climatic conditions, geographical features, resource distribution, and mission objectives. In single-player non-campaign games, each map has specific predetermined victory conditions. However, in multiplayer games, all maps can be won by either destroying one of an opponent's "Special Buildings", by promoting one's knight to the highest level possible, or by invading an opponent's city, prompting their citizens to go on strike, which will eventually cripple their economy.

=== Settlement and settlers ===
Screenshot of Rise of an Empire, showing the centrality of the player's marketplace, seen here currently hosting a festival. The Storehouse and Cathedral are above the marketplace, to the left and right, respectively. The image also shows the game's newly designed HUD.

Whether playing in single-player or multiplayer mode, each game begins roughly the same way; the player is positioned at a set location on the map, with three prebuilt "Special Buildings"; the Castle, the Cathedral, and the Storehouse and accompanying marketplace. The Castle determines the upper limit of soldiers, is where the player's knight heals if injured, and is where the player sets the tax rate and soldiers' salary. The Cathedral determines the upper limit of settlers. Sermons can also be called here, which generate income, and temporarily raise the city's reputation. The Storehouse is where raw materials are stored and where traders collect items to make their produce. Trade with other settlements is conducted from the Storehouse. Attached to the Storehouse is the Marketplace, where the player can organise festivals. When the player calls for a festival, a certain number of male settlers will attend. At the same time, women will emerge from the Storehouse. If a man and woman are attracted to one another, they will talk, then dance, and subsequently become a couple. When the festival is over, the woman will return with the man to his place of work. Women acquire more food and take care of cleaning, thus giving men more time to work, which increases productivity.

The basic gameplay revolves around serfs (the titular "settlers"), who populate and perform the requisite task of each building. As in all previous Settlers titles except Heritage of Kings, the player is unable to directly control any individual settler. Instead, when the player elects to construct a building, a settler automatically emerges from the Storehouse with the necessary construction material, travels to the site, and constructs the building. Unlike all previous Settlers titles, in Rise of an Empire, buildings are constructed and upgraded by the settlers who work within them. Each settler's workplace is also his place of residence. Each time a building is upgraded, an additional settler joins the workforce of that building, with the new settler bringing the required construction material to the site, upgrading the building, and then moving in. All buildings can be upgraded twice. When a resource building is upgraded, the amount of resources that can be stockpiled before a worker must bring them to the Storehouse increases from three to six, and finally, to nine. Each upgrade also improves the mode of transport; at level one, settlers carry resources on their back; at level two, they transport resources via a hand-drawn cart, and at level three, they do so via a donkey and cart. To assist in the transportation of goods, the game features an optional road network. Initially, the player can only build trails, on which settlers move a little faster than on rough ground. When the player's knight reaches a certain level of promotion, the player can build roads, on which settlers move much faster.

The only settler which the player can control directly is the thief. Unable to fight, the thief can steal goods, gold, and information from opponents. Thieves can walk through enemy territory, appearing as if they are a member of the opponent's settlement. However, if a thief gets too close to an enemy battalion, he will be identified and killed. If a thief is sent to an enemy castle and successfully steals information, the fog of war over the opponent's territory will temporarily lift. Introduced in the Eastern Realm was another specialist settler; the geologist. When an iron mine or stone quarry is depleted, if the player sends the geologist to the area, he will partially replenish the depleted mine or quarry.

=== Economy ===
The game's economic model is considerably streamlined when compared to previous Settlers titles. A settler in a resource building will walk to the nearest source of raw materials, gather them, and return to his building. When the building is full, one of the settlers living there will take the resources to the Storehouse. A settler in a produce building will then walk to the Storehouse and bring the raw materials back to his building, using them to make finished goods, which are then sold from that same building. All resources except water are gathered by resource buildings; water is gathered as needed from the well in the Marketplace by the settlers in the produce buildings. New to Rise of an Empire are needs and wants. Settlers in resource buildings have only one need (food), and no wants. Settlers in produce buildings have wants under two headings (prosperity and decoration), and as the city grows, they acquire increasingly diversified needs. Needs fall under four headings; food, clothes, cleanliness, and entertainment. If the player doesn't ensure a settler's needs are met, that settler will eventually go on strike.

Gold is the only way to upgrade Special Buildings, recruit an army, build military outposts, and stage festivals. The main way for the player to earn gold is through taxation; tax collectors regularly ride through the city collecting tax from each produce building at a rate set by the player. Secondary sources of gold include collections at sermons, selling surplus goods to another settlement, stealing from other settlements' Castles, and stealing other settlers' trade carts.

The game features five different types of diplomatic relationship; "Enemy" (no trade is possible, fog of war is in effect, will attack the player), "Unknown" (no trade, fog of war, but will not attack), "Established contact" (the player can sell goods, but not purchase any, no fog of war, may ask the player for help), "Trade contact" (trade is possible in both directions when the player's knight is at their Storehouse, no fog of war), and "Allied" (no fog of war, knight does not need to be at their Storehouse to trade, will come to the player's defence when attacked, and will expect that same support in return). Introduced in The Eastern Realm were trading posts, which allow players to establish recurring monthly trades.

Also important to the economy are climatic zones and seasons, which can have various effects on the player's settlement. For example, in winter, crops cannot grow, there is no fishing, and beekeepers cannot produce honey. The four climatic zones are Northland, North Temperate, South Temperate, and Southland. Northland sees long winters with heavy snowfall. North Temperate features snowy winters and warm summers. South Temperate has long, hot summers, and no snow during the winter, but fertile soil is less common. Southland features long, dry summers, with farming and animal cultivation only possible in and around rivers and oases. The Eastern Empire added a fifth climatic zone; Far East, which features a two-month rainy season bringing monsoons. During this period, rivers cannot be crossed, farmers and beekeepers cannot work, fishing is impossible, and bathhouses are closed.

=== Military ===
The player's territory can only be expanded by building an outpost in unoccupied territory. Every map in the game is divided into territories, with the amount of gold required to build an outpost determined by the amount and type of resources available in that territory. Outposts do not require troops within them to claim territory. If a territory is already occupied, the play must attack the opponent's outpost, and if it is sufficiently damaged, the territory becomes neutral, with all buildings within it destroyed. To claim the territory, the player must either occupy the damaged outpost or build a new outpost as normal. Outposts can only be built in unoccupied territory when the player's knight is in that territory.

Similarly to Settlers IV, in Rise of an Empire, the player's military strength is tied to the reputation of their settlement; the higher the reputation, the higher the combat strength of the army. A settlement's reputation is determined by the upgrade level of Special Buildings, the status of needs and wants, the acquisition of rare items such as salt and dye, the diversity of food, clothing, and cleaning products, the entertainment available, the frequency of sermons at the Cathedral and festivals at the marketplace, the number of decorations in the settlement, and the number of rich buildings. Reputation will fall if enemies invade, taxes are set too high, soldiers cannot be paid, or settlers are striking because of unfulfilled needs.

As with Heritage of Kings, Rise of an Empire features hero units, but unlike Heritage of Kings, only one knight can be used per map, with the player free to choose which one. As well as undertaking quests, the knight's level of promotion marks the overall progress of the settlement, with certain buildings and options only becoming available when the knight has reached a specific level. Each level of promotion also introduces more complex needs and wants, as a higher standard of living is reached. For the player to promote their knight, a settlement must meet various criteria at each level. In the original game, there were six knights. The Eastern Empire added one additional knight. Each knight has his or her own attributes and abilities, with each having one passive and one active ability. Once used, an active ability cannot be used again until a certain amount of time has passed. If a knight is defeated in battle, he/she returns to the Castle to heal, during which time the player cannot use the knight.

There are two classes of military unit in the game; swordsmen and bowmen. Both types must be recruited in groups of six at a time, meaning the player cannot recruit any soldiers unless they have enough resources to recruit at least six. To attack enemy buildings, soldiers use torches, of which they have a limited number (each soldier carries one torch), and to replenish their supply of torches, the battalion must travel to the barracks, an outpost, or the player's Castle. The player can also build both offensive and defensive siege engines. Catapults are used to breach enemy walls, but cannot damage gates; battering rams can breach enemy gates, but cannot attack walls; siege towers are used to get soldiers over enemy walls. Offensive engines require a full battalion of six soldiers for assemblage and operation. In terms of defensive engines, the player can build mounted catapults, which are deployed on towers along the player's walls; and stone traps, which can be used at gates. Mounted catapults operate automatically, but stone traps must be triggered manually. The player can also build walls around their city; palisades can be burnt down and cannot have troops or mounted catapults stationed on them. Walls can support troops and catapults, and can only be damaged by siege engines, specifically catapults.

== Plot ==
The game takes place in the same fictional universe as Heritage of Kings, where many centuries have passed since Dario defeated Mordred and Kerberos, reuniting the Old Empire. However, the Empire, now known as the "Darion Empire", has fractured once more. Centuries of invasions, rebellions, and political machinations have altered it into a group of autonomous provinces in a perpetual state of war with one another. In the province of Vestholm on the island of Westerlin, a newly ascended king is determined to rebuild the Empire, and the game begins with his two most trusted knights, Lady Alandra and Lord Marcus, alerting him that bandits have been raiding merchant carts on their way to the city. Establishing a settlement in the vicinity, so as to protect the merchants, the knights then head to nearby Challia to investigate why the carts have been coming without military protection. There they learn that Narlindir Vikings have been assaulting coastal settlements. Pushing back the Vikings, they are joined by the merchant Elias, and next head to Gallos, where the mercenary Kestral also joins their ranks.

As they travel to the continent of Narlind, Elias speculates that someone other than the Vikings themselves may be pulling the strings. Heading to the province of Narfang, they learn that a southern ambassador was recently taken prisoner by a woman named Crimson Sabatt, who is responsible for the Viking raids. They rescue the ambassador, Hakim Abd-Al Sar, who tells them he came to Narfang seeking allies against Sabatt's master, the Red Prince, and he too joins the party. Meanwhile, Sabatt informs the Prince of the king's mission. He is unconcerned, however, ordering Sabatt to destroy him.

Still in Narlind, the party are joined by the bard Thordal, and after assisting local villages in various ways, many Narlinders swear fealty to the king. Meanwhile, Sabatt reports to the Red Prince that Narlind has joined the king. Furious, he calls for arms, but Sabatt suggests one of the king's knights may be turned to their cause. Heading back to the mainland, the party travel south, to Hakim's home province of Sahir. As the party secure an alliance with the local tribes, one of the knights meets with Sabatt, (Note: The game automatically selects whichever knight the player has used the least as the traitor.) who tells him that if he helps the Prince, he will be allowed to rule over Westerlin, an offer to which he agrees.

The party then head to Gueranna, Sabatt's home, where they storm her citadel, and arrest her. Upon returning to Vestholm, they find the Red Prince's army marching towards the city and learn of Marcus's betrayal. Deciding it best if the king remains with all but one of the knights to protect him, that knight escapes, contacts their allies, and breaks the rest of the party out of prison. They subsequently capture Marcus, as the Prince retreats to his fortress, high in the mountains of Rossotorres. The party and their allies storm the fortress, arresting the Prince. Brought before the king, he gloats that in 300 years the Empire will be forgotten. The game then cuts to 600 years later – the modern day. A father and his daughter are walking towards a castle to celebrate the anniversary of the Empire's unification. The father tells his daughter of the "First King", and how he united the Empire, but she points out that everyone knows that story, which they learn in school.

=== The Eastern Realm ===
The Eastern Realm begins several months after the Red Prince's defeat, with Elias, Hakim, and Marcus (who has been forgiven for his betrayal), alerting the king that the southern kingdom of Basa has lost contact with the neighbouring kingdom of Hidun. In response, the king sends the trio to Basrima, a province on the border of Basa and Hidun. After ridding the area of petty bandits and defending against the Red Prince's former soldiers turned mercenaries intercepting communications between the two kingdoms, the party are led to the mercenaries' camp by a local woman. There, they find that the former soldiers were in the service of the "Goddess of the Green Fire". The woman then introduces herself as Saraya, daughter of Praphat, Mogul of Hidun. She joins the party, telling them that after losing contact with Basa, Praphat set out to investigate. However, contact with his expedition was also lost, and Saraya was searching for him when she was attacked by an army led by "strange priests".

The party travel to the province of Hendalla in Hidun, where they learn that priests recently told the settlers that Hidun was cursed, and only Khana, the priests' leader, could save them. Praphet soon arrives, telling the party he has sent a spy into Khana's camp, before heading for Thela, Hidun's capital. Meanwhile, the spy sends word that Khana is in Amesthan. Accompanied by a battalion of Praphat's troops, the party are ambushed as soon as they arrive, having been led into a trap. Holding off Khana's troops, they are shocked when Praphet's battalion also attacks them. They repel the attack, but cannot understand how Khana could have persuaded the troops to join her. They soon learn that the battalion attacked on the orders of Praphat himself. Marcus then brings word that Khana has attacked Thela, which is badly damaged, but unconquered. Subsequently, Praphat has his men abduct Saraya, telling her: "I have come to rescue you from the invaders. Khana will protect us both".

Learning that Saraya is to be publicly sacrificed, the party travel to Almerabad, where she is being held. There, they are met by Namawili, a disciple of the real Khana. They free Saraya, who tells them that Khana has sent Praphat to Praphatstan to raise an army to finish off Thela. Namawili says Thela can be fortified before the army attacks, but only if the party are able to locate the treasure of Dario, hidden in the mountains of Idukun. They retrieve the treasure, which they transport to Thela, before heading to Praphatstan. Although they are no match for the city's defences, they cut off the military buildings from their iron sources. Telling the party that the army in Praphatstan was only part of the plan, and another legion is stationed elsewhere, Praphat flees. The party next travel to Nakhara, Khana's home province. As she gloats that she has already dispatched Praphat to destroy Thela, the party storm the city, and arrest her. They also learn that Khana secured Praphat's loyalty by giving him a draught that eroded his will.

In Thela, as the party set about securing the support of the local villages, Namawili arrives with the recipe for an antidote to Khana's draught. Procuring the necessary ingredients, Namawili brews the antidote. When Praphat leads a series of raiding parties against the local villages, the party capture him and administer it. Shortly thereafter, he regains his senses, telling Saraya that he dreamt of a witch in green. With the war over and Hidun secure, Praphat thanks the party, and tells the king that he will always have an ally in Hidun.

== Development ==
=== The Settler gene ===
Blue Byte began development of Rise of an Empire in 2005, immediately after the release of The Settlers: Heritage of Kings - Legends Expansion Disc. In an October 2006 press release, Ubisoft stated that "the focus of the sixth part of the series is the construction of large and fortified cities, and their planning and optimisation in a medieval world". Referring to the game's graphics as "the best ever seen in a strategy game", they explained that the designers had been working to identify "the Settler gene"; that quintessential component or components which make the Settlers series unique. In an interview with 4players several weeks later, producer Benedikt Grindel explained that the design philosophy behind the game was "to understand the Settlers series in its entirety". Also speaking to 4players in October 2006, co-designer Andreas Suika explained "we're taking something from all the Settlers parts, and making the best Settlers there can be."

Blue Byte were designing the game upon the cornerstones of city-building, real-time strategy, and economic simulation, with graphics based around a combination of the caricatured cartoon-like design of the settlers from the first four titles (dubbed "Wuselfaktor"), and the more realistic 3D graphics from Heritage of Kings. To best facilitate their search for the Settler gene, the development team was populated with numerous Settlers veterans; Andreas Suika and lead programmer Dietmar Meschede had worked on The Settlers IV and Heritage of Kings; map designer Frank Hoffmeister had worked on Heritage of Kings and The Settlers II (10th Anniversary); lead artist Thorsten Mutschall had worked on The Settlers III, The Settlers IV, and Heritage of Kings; and Benedikt Grindel had worked on Heritage of Kings.

By June 2007, the designers were confident they had isolated the Settler gene, revealing the game would feature a combination of some of the more popular game mechanics from previous titles in the series; the road network from The Settlers, The Settlers II and The Settlers II (10th Anniversary), expansion by means of military outposts from The Settlers, The Settlers II, The Settlers III, The Settlers IV, and The Settlers II (10th Anniversary), a correlation between military strength and the prosperity of one's city from The Settlers IV, and the inclusion of heroes, taxation, and soldier's salary from Heritage of Kings. Grindel stated of the game: "It is a building strategy game, paired with the strengths of its immediate predecessor; easy access, use of heroic knights through whom the story is told, and outstanding graphics". Similarly, at Ubisoft's Ubidays event in July, Grindel stated that "we really wanted to grab the essence of what people like about the different games, to make one Settlers game that really summarises what the series is about". This was reiterated by associate producer Dennis Rohlfing just prior to the release of The Eastern Realm expansion in 2008: "We returned to the roots of the series, but also included the many strong features of Heritage of Kings, such as a gentle learning curve, and heroes who carry the story. Also, the look changed again; although still a medieval world, it is quite idealised, with many references to the look of older Settler games".

=== Gameplay and graphics ===
In his October 2006 interview with 4players, Andreas Suika addressed the relationship between Rise of an Empire and previous Settlers titles, specifically Heritage of Kings:

If you look at Heritage of Kings, and develop the series consistently from that point, we would have a pure RTS with no economy. And we don't want that. There are many people who say there was too much fighting in Settlers 5, and we agree. We want to reduce this in favour of economic-based gameplay. But everything that worked well, and was well received, for example, the 3D engine or the more realistic graphics, we want to strengthen and expand.

Speaking of Heritage of Kings, Grindel opined, "we strayed too far from the basic concept of The Settlers," acknowledging that the military aspect of the game was too foregrounded. Hoping to rectify this in Rise of an Empire, he explained that, for the most part, combat would be optional. He reiterated this point in a July 2007 interview with IGN: "As The Settlers: Rise of an Empire focuses on construction, there are ways to make sure to have enough time to prepare for defence. Combat is a challenge the player meets while creating his city, not the ultimate goal of each map".

In terms of graphics, Rise of an Empire uses the same engine as Heritage of Kings, RenderWare, albeit heavily modified. Five times more polygons have been used for the buildings, and three times more for the settlers and soldiers, whilst texture resolution has quadrupled. Thorsten Mutschall explained that the graphical goal was primarily to maintain what Blue Byte refer to as "the aquarium effect" (detailed graphics clearly depicting a settler's task; such as a settler in the siege engine workshop operating machinery). In tandem with this, the designers also wanted to create a living world that responds to events in a realistic manner; for example, settlers emerging from a tavern will be unsteady on their feet, men and women can be seen dancing together at festivals, when two settlers approach one another on the road one will move out of the way of the other, animals react to the presence of nearby settlers, butterflies land on flowers, dogs urinate against walls, lights in windows shimmer in different patterns depending on the time of year.

=== Promotion ===
In July 2007, Ubisoft released "Honey for a King", a minigame designed to promote the main game, in which the player must help a beekeeper collect honey by directing swarms of bees. Available as a free download from Ubisoft and Blue Byte's websites, the game allows players to upload their scores to a global high score table. In August, an open beta was made available for download. At the Games Convention later that month, Microsoft announced that Ubisoft would be releasing several of its upcoming titles under the Games for Windows brand, with Rise of an Empire the first such title.

Shortly before the release of the game, Ubisoft unveiled a Vegetarian Edition as a free downloadable mod, which eliminates sausages and smoked fish from the game's economy. The Vegetarian Edition was released in March 2008, along with two specially designed maps.

Ubisoft released the game in three editions in Germany; a standard edition, a Limited Edition (containing a DVD with a "making of" documentary, an art book, a soundtrack CD, a technology tree card, two in-game statues not available in the regular edition, and a demo), and an Ubisoft Edition (only available from Ubisoft stores, and containing the regular edition, the two in-game statues, and a Settlers-style leather bag). A few days before the game's release, Ubisoft revealed that a map editor would be made available as a free download later in the year. Including both a basic version and a professional version for more experienced users, the editor was released in November.

== Reception ==
Reception

Aggregate score
Aggregator	Score
Metacritic	66/100

Review scores
Publication	Score
Eurogamer	5/10
GameSpot	7/10 (original); 6/10 (Gold)
GameSpy	2.5/5
IGN	6.5/10 (NA); 7/10 (UK)
PC Games (DE)	74%

Award
Publication	Award
Deutscher Entwicklerpreis	Best German Game, Best Level Design, Best Interface, Best Cutscenes, Best Graphics, Best Score (2007)

Rise of an Empire received "mixed or average" reviews, and holds an aggregate score of 66 out of 100 on Metacritic, based on nineteen reviews.

PC Games' Petra Fröhlich scored the game 74%, finding it inferior to the first four Settlers titles and Anno 1701, but superior to Heritage of Kings. She was critical of both the AI and the city management game mechanic, arguing that it didn't seem to matter what the player does, as "even the worst settlement somehow runs fine". She was also disappointed in the implementation of diplomacy, which she found "does not exist in the truest sense". Although she praised the graphics, opining that it was the best looking strategy game ever made, she concluded that "all the raw materials, buildings, upgrades, heroes, and seasons suggest more complexity and variety than the game actually offers". In a 2010 retrospective on the Settlers series, Thomas Wilke cited Rise of an Empire as the weakest Settlers title thus far, calling the single-player campaign "boring and without highlights", and the gameplay "undemanding, even for genre novices".

GameSpot's Brett Todd scored it 7 out of 10, finding it, in contradistinction to Wilke, "the most fulfilling game in the series". Despite this, he criticised the single-player campaign as "linear and predictable", and was also critical of the programming, citing frequent crashes and "performance problems". However, he concluded by acknowledging that the game "does an impressive job of moving the Settlers series closer to the big leagues". He later scored the Gold Edition 6.5 out of 10, finding The Eastern Realm "formulaic" and made up of "mostly lackadaisical mission design".

IGN's Dan Adams scored it 6.5 out of 10. Although acknowledging it "has the best visuals the series has ever seen", he was critical of the single-player campaign, which he found too easy, the "basically non-existent" diplomacy, and the combat game mechanics, which he felt were "sad by strategy standards" and "simple to the extreme". He was also critical of the game's frequent crashes, and although he found it "the best game in the series", Adams also felt it "still manages to screw enough things up to be aggravating". Writing for IGN UK, Jake Severn scored it 7 out of 10, finding it "doesn't go out of its way to dazzle, shock or amuse". Arguing that it does nothing that hasn't been done before in other games, he concluded, "Rise of an Empire isn't a breakthrough. It's as far from groundbreaking as you can be, [but] ultimately, it does what it sets out to do".

GameSpy's Allen Rausch scored it 2.5 out of 5, finding it "too simple for its own good", and arguing that, in large part, it plays itself, with minimal input from the player. Although praising the graphics and animations, he felt it was "a decidedly mediocre game" and "narrow in scope".

Eurogamer's Dan Whitehead scored it 5 out of 10. He too criticised the game's programming, arguing that "Blue Byte seems more than a little out of its depth trying to keep its flagship series in line with the demands of modern gaming". Finding the single-player campaign "uninspired" and the streamlined economic system "simplified to an almost insulting degree", Whitehead was also critical of combat, which he found was void of any kind of strategic elements. Although he found it slightly superior to Heritage of Kings, he wrote that "there's no getting away from the fact that judged against its peers, or even its own ancestors, this is an average offering".

=== Sales and awards ===
The game was a commercial success, and was the highest selling German-made game of 2007. By January 2008, it had sold over 100,000 units in Germany.

At the 2007 Deutscher Entwicklerpreis, it won six awards; "Best German Game" (the first game in the series to do so), "Best Level Design", "Best Interface", "Best Cutscenes", "Best Graphics", and "Best Score". It also won the TOMMI award at the 2007 Deutscher Kindersoftwarepreis.

== Expansions ==
=== The Eastern Realm ===
The Settlers: Rise of an Empire - The Eastern Realm was announced in January 2008, and released in March, featuring a new eight-mission single-player campaign, fifteen new maps for single-player and multiplayer modes, an enhanced map editor, a new knight, and several new embellishments for the player's settlement. A new climatic zone was also added; the Far East, featuring a two-month monsoon season during which time farmers and beekeepers cannot work, fishing is impossible, rivers cannot be crossed, and bathhouses are closed. The expansion also added geologists, whom the player can send to depleted iron mines or stone quarries to partially replenish them. Additionally, players could use trading posts to establish regular (once a month) trade with a trading partner.

=== Gold Edition ===
Released in September 2008, The Settlers: Rise of an Empire - Gold Edition contains the original game and The Eastern Realm expansion, plus three new maps for single player and multiplayer modes. The Gold Edition was also released on Uplay and Steam, and in 2015 was made available on GOG.com.

=== History Edition ===
In November 2018, Ubisoft re-released the Gold Edition as both a standalone History Edition and as part of The Settlers: History Collection. Optimised for Windows 10, the re-release contains both the original game and The Eastern Realm expansion, and features adjustable resolutions and online multiplayer. The History Edition replaced the Gold Edition previously available on Steam. Available only on Uplay, History Collection also includes re-releases of The Settlers, The Settlers II, The Settlers III, The Settlers IV, Heritage of Kings, and The Settlers 7: Paths to a Kingdom.
