= The Settlers II (10th Anniversary) =

2006 city-building and real-time strategy video game

- Developer: Blue Byte
- Publisher: Ubisoft
- Producer: Thomas Friedmann
- Designers: Thomas Friedmann; Thomas Häuser; Thorsten Kneisel; Lothar Schmitt
- Programmers: Peter Sprys; Andreas Nitsche
- Artist: Thorsten Kneisel
- Writer: Yvonne Kneisel
- Composer: Aaron Marks
- Series: The Settlers
- Platform: Windows
- Release: DE: September 7, 2006; UK: September 12, 2006; NA: September 16, 2006
- Genres: City-building, real-time strategy
- Modes: Single-player, multiplayer

The Settlers II (10th Anniversary) (German: Die Siedler II: Die nächste Generation) is a 2006 city-building game with real-time strategy elements for Windows. Developed by Blue Byte and published by Ubisoft, it was released worldwide in September 2006. It is a remake of The Settlers II (1996). In March 2007, Blue Byte released a German-language expansion, Die Siedler II: Die nächste Generation - Wikinger (English: The Settlers II: The Next Generation - Vikings), featuring new single-player campaign missions, new maps for both single-player and multiplayer modes, a random map generator, and minor gameplay tweaks. In September 2008, they released Die Siedler: Aufbruch der Kulturen (English: The Settlers: Awakening of Cultures), a spiritual successor to Die nächste Generation. In 2013, the original 10th Anniversary game was released on GOG.com.

In the game's single-player campaign, the player controls a group of Romans who are shipwrecked on an uncharted island after fleeing Rome in the wake of a series of natural disasters and the mysterious disappearance of every Roman woman. Stranded and without hope of rescue, they must use a series of magical portals to try to find their way back to the Empire. During their travels, they come into conflict with Nubians and Chinese, learning that both races have also experienced the loss of their female population. Wikinger takes place centuries later, when the portals are commonly used by various races to facilitate trade with one another. However, when the Vikings' portal is sabotaged by a group of pirates led by a man known as "The Wolf", all other portals throughout the world cease to function. Initially operating independently of one another, but ultimately joining forces, the Romans, Nubians, Chinese and Vikings set out to learn why the portal was destroyed and defeat The Wolf.

Although featuring updated 3D graphics and sound effects, and a new storyline, the gameplay and game mechanics remain relatively unchanged from the original Settlers II. The overriding design principal for 10th Anniversary was to renovate the original rather than reinvent it, and as a result, the designers elected to make only minor changes to the core template. For example, the different races now have aesthetically differentiated buildings; military buildings can now be upgraded, and soldiers evacuated from each building at any time; when the player demolishes a building, they now get back half the construction costs; and a day/night cycle has been added. The game also features an online multiplayer mode, and a map editor, which allows players to both create new maps and import maps from the original.

The Settlers II (10th Anniversary) received relatively little attention in the gaming press outside Germany, with mixed reviews. Whilst the graphics and sound effects were generally praised, and the designers were lauded for retaining so much of the original game's mechanics, some critics felt it was too reverential to the original, and, as a result, seemed dated. Other criticisms included a lack of mission variety and repetitive gameplay, with several critics opining that it should have been a budget title rather than a full-price release.

== Gameplay ==
The Settlers II (10th Anniversary) is a city-building game, with real-time strategy elements, controlled via a point and click interface. The gameplay and game mechanics are nearly identical to the original Settlers II, and the primary goal on each map is to build a settlement with a functioning economy, producing sufficient military units so as to conquer rival territories, ultimately gaining control of either the entire map, or a certain predetermined section of it. To achieve this end, the player must engage in economic micromanagement, construct buildings, and generate resources.

=== Game modes ===
The game can be played in one of two modes; single-player or multiplayer. In single-player mode, the player can play either campaign missions or individual non-campaign games ("Freeplay"). In Campaign mode, the player must complete a series of missions, the goal of each of which is to defeat the computer controlled opponent or opponents by gaining possession of the territory in which the mission objective is located. In the original release of the game, there were ten missions, with the player limited to controlling the Romans. The Wikinger expansion added a new campaign of twelve missions, with the player able to control the three races from the original game (Romans, Nubians, and Chinese), plus the newly added Vikings.

In Freeplay and multiplayer modes, which can be played via a LAN or online, the player chooses a map on which to play, and then refines the game in various ways, such as selecting the number of players (from two to six) and the difficulty level of computer controlled races, choosing which race to control, selecting the victory conditions, refining the amount of raw materials available to each player at the start of the game, selecting whether to turn fog of war on or off, and choosing whether each player begins from a predetermined position on the map or is instead placed randomly. As well as including numerous predesigned maps for use in Freeplay and multiplayer modes, the game also features a map editor, which allows players to both create their own maps and import maps from the original Settlers II.

=== Settlers and transportation ===
Whether playing in single-player or multiplayer mode, each game begins the same way; the player has one building, a warehouse/headquarters, in which are a set amount of raw materials and tools. The basic gameplay revolves around serfs (the titular "settlers") who transport materials, tools and produce, and who populate and perform the requisite task of each building. As the player constructs buildings and thus requires settlers to occupy them, the settlers automatically emerge from the warehouse as needed. As the settlement continues to grow in size, the warehouse's quota of settlers will eventually be reached, and the player will need to build an additional warehouse to generate more settlers. At no point does the player directly control any individual settler - instead, general orders are issued (such as ordering the construction of a building), with the AI handling the delegation of orders to specific settlers.

Screenshot of The Settlers II (10th Anniversary). The HUD shows part of the player's settlement, with the various buildings linked by roads. The roads are demarcated by waypoints (blue flags), which function as hubs for the distribution of goods, with a single settler operating between each flag. The image also shows the game's 3D graphics, and the zoom function.

An important game mechanic is the construction of a road network to allow for an efficient transportation system, as any settlers transporting goods must use roads. To build a road, the player must place a flag, select the "build road" option, and then select where they wish the road to end. The computer will then automatically find the best route between the two and build the road, although the player is also free to build the road manually. To maximize distribution, the player must set as many flags as possible on each road. Flags can only be set a certain distance apart, and serve as transport hubs; a settler will carry an item to a flag and set it down, at which point the next settler along will pick up the item and continue, freeing the first settler to return and pick up another item at the previous flag. The more flags the player has, the more settlers will operate on a given road, cutting down the distance each settler must travel, and reducing the time to transport one item and return for the next, thus avoiding item congestion at each flag. When more than one item is placed at a flag, the game has an adjustable goods priority system, which determines the order in which items are transported. Players can also build shipyards, which allow for the manufacture of rafts (can transport goods over small stretches of water), and ships (can transport goods across oceans).

=== Economy ===
The economy is under the player's control throughout the game and is adjustable in multiple ways. For example, the player can control the distribution of goods by selecting how much of a given resource is transported to a given building, under six separate headings; food, grain, iron, coal, planks and water. In a similar manner, the player can select what tools are made when; by increasing the significance of a particular tool, that tool will be produced before others. Tool production is important insofar as all buildings require raw materials and a worker with the right tool. For example, if the player has built a bakery, and the building is still empty despite idle settlers in the headquarters, a rolling pin must be manufactured in the toolsmith. The game also uses a notification system that alerts the player if a building cannot be occupied either due to a lack of the right tool or the absence of available settlers.

=== Military ===
The player's territory can only be expanded by building a military complex near the territory border. Each complex must have at least one soldier garrisoned for the territory to expand. Soldiers are automatically created from the pool of existing settlers in the headquarters, with each soldier requiring a sword, shield, and one unit of beer. Once soldiers are garrisoned, gold coins can be transported to the building to increase their rank. The player can also build lookout towers, which can see for great distances, but don't grant new territory. A new feature of the gameplay in 10th Anniversary is that military buildings can be upgraded; for example, a barracks can be replaced by a guard house without having to demolish the barracks and then build the guard house.

The player also has control over the structure of their military, and is free to change the rank of first-line defence soldiers, how many soldiers from each building can be used offensively, how many soldiers counter the enemy if nearby buildings are attacked, and how many soldiers take up positions in buildings in the settlement's centre, further out, and on the borders. New to the 10th Anniversary is that the player can order garrisoned soldiers to evacuate any given military complex and redeploy them to any other, allowing the player to move soldiers to where they are needed most.

For the player to attack an enemy building, they must click on that building, and select both the number of units and what rank they wish to use to carry out the attack. If the player's units defeat all soldiers stationed in the building, they will occupy it, with the player's territory increasing according to the building's radius. The player can also use catapults to attack enemy military buildings. Catapults are immobile, and fire stones at enemy buildings within their range, with each successful hit killing one occupying soldier. If all soldiers are killed, the building burns down, and the enemy loses the territory controlled by that building. Defense of the player's military buildings is automatic; as enemies attack, any soldiers stationed in the building defend.

== Plot ==
Following a series of unexplainable disasters in Rome (the female population disappearing overnight, disease spreading through the livestock, a drought, a plague of locusts, the eruption of a nearby volcano), the Roman people seek the advice of a travelling seer, who tells them he sees a future of prosperity and harmony, but not before they undertake a long and arduous journey. Interpreting this to mean they must establish a new homeland on foreign soil, the Romans prepare an expedition. However, several days into the voyage, they are caught in a storm, and although they survive, their ships are lost, leaving them stranded on an uncharted island.

Several months later, they encounter a mysterious portal engraved with Coptic writing. Unwilling to return to Rome with nothing to show for their efforts, they enter the portal. Emerging in a hot and arid land, they eventually encounter Nubians. Learning there is another portal beyond the Nubian settlement, the Romans ask for access to it, but the Nubians refuse. Shortly thereafter, an armed conflict breaks out. The Romans overwhelm the Nubians, the survivors of whom flee into the portal, with the Romans giving chase.

On the other side of the portal, they reach a Nubian settlement, where they learn the Nubians have met the same fate as themselves; their women have disappeared without explanation. They also learn the Nubians are in conflict with a much stronger group of Chinese, who have cut them off from their Pharaoh, Tanotamun. Empathising with their situation, the Romans offer their assistance. Fighting their way through a Chinese blockade, they lift the siege on Tanotamun's castle and reunite him with his people.

Emerging through another portal, they learn that the Chinese women have also disappeared. Climbing to a portal on top of a mountain, the Romans then find themselves in a massive cavern. Having defeated a Chinese settlement, they are surprised to learn the portal in the cavern leads back to the island on which they were originally marooned. Building a ship with supplies gathered on their journey, they return to Rome, finding the women have returned, albeit without any explanation for their disappearance. Pondering the meaning of recent events, the Romans conclude, "the path was the goal of our journey".

=== Wikinger ===
Wikinger takes place many centuries after the main game, when portals are used by all races for exploration and trade. During a feast in the Viking capital, their portal explodes, and a group of Vikings are sucked into the resulting vortex, emerging on a beach. Electing Eirigg as their leader, they head towards a nearby village where they see some of the people with whom they had been feasting, a group who they thought were Chinese diplomats were actually pirates. The Vikings raid the village, finding it full of flags embroidered with a wolf. They then head towards a nearby portal. Passing through a Nubian village, they learn the portal ceased functioning a few days prior, and as a result, they decide to explore the region.

Meanwhile, in Nubia, upon the destruction of the portal, pirates with sails bearing the sign of the wolf advance into the region ruled over by Kvame. Although he is able to push them back, unbeknownst to him, the leader escapes. In the ruins of the pirate camp, they find fragmented portal stones covered with Viking symbols; remnants of the destroyed portal, and Kvame realises the pirates are led by a man known as The Wolf, an infamous pirate. Heading to the nearest Viking settlement, they find it under attack and fight alongside the Vikings. Kvame subsequently discovers The Wolf is using portal stones to transport the men of conquered peoples vast distances, and forcing them to fight for him. The Nubians then learn The Wolf aims to conquer the Chinese Empire, and from there, the entire world. With this in mind, Kvame vows to return the stones to the Vikings, and help defend the Empire.

Several months have now passed since the Vikings were sucked into the portal. Arriving at a Viking colony, they see it is under attack by the pirates. Pushing them back, Eirigg learns The Wolf has already begun the assault on the Empire's capital, and sets sail to help defend it.

Meanwhile, with the destruction of the Vikings' portal, the portal in Rome also ceased to function. Several months later, a Chinese envoy arrives, explaining the Imperial Court is under attack. The Senate devise a plan to gain possession of the portal stones and use them to rule the world, and to this end, they send a force under the command of Caius Publius to aid the Chinese. Heading first to a Nubian island, Caius is able to negotiate with the Nubian general to turn over possession of his portal stone.

At the same time, in an isolated region of the Empire, The Wolf orders his Nubian allies to occupy an island fortress, planning to use it for his global campaign. However, a small tribe of Chinese determine to win it back. The Wolf is able to escape, but he leaves behind documents detailing his plan to capture the capital. Upon learning this, the Chinese set sail for the city.

The Vikings, Nubians, Romans, and loyalist Chinese arrive at the capital at roughly the same time, and although the city has already fallen to The Wolf, the Emperor has escaped and is hiding in a small village. After agreeing to work together, the Vikings, Nubians, and Romans are scattered by a storm, with the Vikings landing on an uninhabited island off the coast. As Eirigg prepares his forces, Kvame and Caius send him their portal stones. Shortly thereafter, the pirates take control of the village in which the Emperor is hiding. He is able to escape, travelling to the safety of the Vikings' island. Meanwhile, Eirigg attacks, finding the last portal stone among the ruins. He is eventually able to defeat the pirates and retake the city. The Wolf escapes in a small boat but is caught in a storm, and drowns. The Vikings reassemble the portal, help the Chinese make repairs to the city, and then return home.

== Development ==
In March 2006, Ubisoft confirmed what had been rumoured in the German gaming press for some time; later in the year, they would be releasing a modern remake of The Settlers II, with their business development director, Ralf Wirsing stating, "there are not many video games that are suitable for such a project, but the second part of The Settlers series is undoubtedly one of them". The game's developers, Blue Byte, who had developed all five titles in the series thus far, had chosen to remake The Settlers II because doing so was the most frequent request they received from fans. Additionally, surveys in German magazines and on gaming websites consistently showed The Settlers II to be the most popular game in the series.

One of the most important early decisions Blue Byte made was to leave the original's gameplay relatively unaltered. Of this decision, Wirsing explained: "The self-contained style of gameplay and the indirect control, in which the settlement and not the individual settlers are controlled, have not lost their charm even ten years after the game was first published". The only significant changes the designers made were giving the different races aesthetically differentiated buildings (in the original, the only difference between races was the design of soldiers), although, as in the original, all three races play identically; redesigning the HUD to take advantage of larger monitors with higher resolutions than were available in 1996; adding an online multiplayer mode; when the player demolishes a building, they now get back half the construction costs; rebuilding and expanding the notification system, plus giving players more control over which notifications they receive; and adding a day/night cycle.

According to project manager and co-designer Thomas Häuser, the most important overarching decision regarding the remake was to renovate the original rather than reinvent it:

The very big issue is that if you talk to people about Settlers II, a lot of people have a lot of ideas how to improve it. This leads to a very big problem. You can add a lot of features to the game, but it instantly defocuses what the game is all about. For example, if you allow direct control of the military or give more detailed control about what is transported from where or asking an individual woodcutter to chop down a tree because it's in the way because you want to build a farm, it completely changes the game. We decided not to change any of these game mechanics at all.

To ensure continuity with the original, the development team included several people who had worked on the 1996 title; Häuser was lead designer and lead programmer, producer and co-designer Thomas Friedmann was a design consultant, and co-designer and art director Thorsten Kneisel was an assistant producer. Speaking of how similar the remake would be to the original, Wirsing explained:

Our goal is a modern implementation of the original. We want the game to be realised in contemporary 3D graphics with light gameplay modifications. There will be a few changes, but they have no influence on the overall playing experience. For example, we are adding a redesigned story campaign, but, of course, there are also free maps for hours of settling. In addition, there is a true multiplayer mode. We have also removed one of the original races from The Settlers II, since they differed only aesthetically.

According to Thomas Friedmann, "we have retained the strengths of the original game." He specifically referred to the reimplementation of the road network, which was dropped from The Settlers III and all subsequent games in the series, and the importance of transport hubs.

Of the graphics, Wirsing explained that "the new Settlers II looks as it would have in 1996 if the technical possibilities of today had existed. At the time, characters and buildings were only a few pixels in size, offering minimal possibilities to show detail". To achieve the modernisation of the 1996 graphics, a specifically designed game engine was used. The graphics were then created using Shader 2.0, allowing older graphics cards to run the game.

Originally, the combat system was taken 1:1 from the original, but after producing a beta version of the game, the designers decided to add a building upgrade system, whereby players can upgrade their military installations without having to demolish and then rebuild them, and an evacuation button, whereby players can order garrisoned soldiers to evacuate any given military complex and redeploy them to any other. The game also features a map editor which can convert the 2D isometric maps from the original into the 3D style used in the remake. This applies both to maps created by the user and predesigned maps included with the game.

=== Release ===
The game was released in Germany in a limited edition with a Roman figurine, a Windows XP-optimised version of the original Settlers II, a making-of booklet, and two Freeplay maps not included with the standard edition. In 2013, the game was released on GOG.com.

== Reception ==
Reception

Aggregate score
| Aggregator | Score |
|---|---|
| GameRankings | 74% |

Review scores
| Publication | Score |
|---|---|
| 4Players | 80% |
| Eurogamer | 7/10 |
| PC Games (DE) | 82% |
| VideoGamer.com | 7/10 |
| Gameswelt | 82% |

10th Anniversary received relatively little critical attention outside Germany. Overall, reviews were mixed, with an aggregate score of 74% on GameRankings, based on five reviews.

PC Games' Stefan Weiß scored it 82%, praising the graphics, but feeling that at €45, it was overpriced. He concluded by calling it "primarily a game for fans of the series".

Gameswelt's André Linken also scored it 82%, citing "lack of variety" as the biggest problem, particularly in relation to mission objectives. Although he acknowledged the simple mission objectives echoed those of the original, he lamented the designers' "unwillingness to restructure". However, he praised the graphics, sound effects, and multiplayer mode, calling it "a terrific remake, [which] has lost none of the original's playfulness or gentleness".

4players' Marcel Kleffmann scored it 80%, also criticising the lack of variety: "Every map is the same. You settle, settle, bustle, settle, fight a bit, and then the scheme repeats itself.". He felt this was especially pronounced in the single-player campaign. He also lamented that each of the races had identical gameplay, with no differentiation between their economic models. Conversely, he praised the implantation of road networks: "The charm of the old road construction system has barely lost anything in a decade as it forces you, in a beautifully managed way, to meticulously set up an efficient settlement".

VideoGamer.com's Paul Devlin scored it 7 out of 10, finding it enjoyable, but dated. Calling it a "lovingly crafted remake", he was impressed with the graphics, sound effects, and music, writing as "Blue Byte should be commended for faithfully recreating the solid gameplay of its beloved original and adding 21st-century bells and whistles". On the other hand, he felt it should have been a budget title, concluding, "For all its undeniable charm and nostalgic worth, The Settlers II is never really more than a retro retread that will probably only appeal to those who remember the original fondly".

Eurogamer.de's Herbert Aichinger also scored it 7 out of 10. Although he praised the graphics and the game's preservation of the original's "charm", he questioned whether nostalgia was enough to carry the game: "In 1996 The Settlers II was among the pioneers of city-building games. At that time, it was still fresh and original. But is it as fascinating today?" He also opined that the game should not have been a full price-release, writing, "the innovations on the original from 1996 are more of a cosmetic nature and do not add any additional facets to the gameplay".

== Wikinger ==
The German-language expansion, Die Siedler II: Die nächste Generation - Wikinger, was released in March 2007, featuring twelve new single-player missions, new maps for both single-player and multiplayer modes, a random map generator, numerous improvements and optimisations to the online multiplayer lobby, a newly designed quest system with more diverse mission objectives and optional sidequests, a more detailed notification system and mini-map, and minor gameplay tweaks. The expansion also allows players to use all three original races plus the newly added Vikings in the single-player campaign, although, as in the main game, the difference between the races is aesthetic only.

== Aufbruch der Kulturen ==
Die Siedler: Aufbruch der Kulturen, a German-language spiritual successor to Die nächste Generation, was released in September 2008, with localised versions released in Poland in 2009 and Russia in 2010. Developed primarily by Funatics Studio, a company founded by ex-Blue Byte personnel, Aufbruch der Kulturen features eleven missions in which the player controls Egyptians, Bavarians and Scots. The game uses the same engine as nächste Generation and features very similar gameplay. Speaking prior to the game's release, Ronald Kaulbach, Ubisoft's International brand manager, stated:

We want to provide clarity for Settlers fans and show them what kind of gaming experience they will get with each Settlers title. There is the "Traditional" series, which includes the new game Aufbruch der Kulturen, as well as the previously released titles Die Siedler II: Die nächste Generation, and the Nintendo DS re-release of the original Settlers II. These traditional games feature the style of older Settlers titles. Then there is the "Evolutionary" series, which features games containing new styles of gameplay and state-of-the-art graphics.

In an interview with Eurogamer.de, the game's writer and co-designer, Kathleen Kunze, said of the decision to split the franchise: "That was the decision of the fans. There are those who say, "We want to continue with the old Settlers concept". They have great fun playing the original Settlers II. And then we have the people who always want innovation. The fanbase has, more or less, developed this way. Because of this, however, there was a lot of disunity in the community, so we decided to label things as "Traditional" and "Evolutionary"".

Although part of the Traditional strand, Aufbruch der Kulturen does feature some new game mechanics. For example, the different races are no longer merely aesthetically differentiated, but now have different economic models, different buildings and different soldiers. The Egyptian economy is very basic, with no complex daisy-chain economic processes, and it can produce large numbers of soldiers very quickly, although these soldiers are comparatively weak. In contrast, the Scots' economy is more complex, with more multi-stage processes, and takes longer to recruit an army. Scottish soldiers, however, are very strong. The Bavarian's economy and soldier recruitment falls in the middle. The game also features magic, whereby each race can call upon their respective deity for economic and/or military assistance. Certain economic process have also been expanded. For example, in The Settlers II and 10th Anniversary, a baker needs flour and water to make bread. In Aufbruch der Kulturen, however, a Bavarian baker needs flour and salt, which must be mined. Also new is the sacrificial temple; if the player places a certain amount of resources on the altar, the settlement will receive a bonus for a limited time, such as buildings moving into areas unreachable by enemies, soldiers receiving an attack bonus, or goods produced faster. Another change is that the game no longer features individual tools; instead, there is simply a single master tool which all workers use in their respective occupation. Single-player games also feature an adjustable difficulty level.

In the game's single-player campaign, during the preparation period for the Olympic Games, the god Olympus notices that the people of the world have become obsessed with money, waging wars on one another to acquire more and more land, and laying waste to the earth in the process. Disgusted by their behaviour, Olympus decides to cancel the games. Meanwhile, the angels Kostas and Theofanos have been observing mankind, and they report to Olympus that if everybody behaved peacefully and respectfully, things would be extremely boring. With this in mind, they suggest he give the people one last chance to show they can be decent. Much to the displeasure of the goddess Sachmet, who is pursuing her own agenda, Olympus agrees, assigning tasks to the various nations so they can prove themselves redeemable. Sachmet, however, is determined to prevent the people from completing Olympus's tasks any way she can.

The game features a 3D online lobby, where players can enter or create multiplayer games, text with other players, create and add to a friends list, send emails, and visit a tailor to alter the appearance of their avatars. The player can also go into a tavern and compete against other players in one of three minigames; dice, chess and Texas hold 'em. The winner receives experience points and money, which can be used to purchase new avatars.
