= Road system =

Road system may refer to:

- Road designation or abbreviation
- Road network, a system of interconnecting lines and points that represent a system of streets or roads for a given area
