= The Settlers III =

1998 real-time strategy and city-building video game

- Developer: Blue Byte
- Publisher: Blue Byte
- Producer: Thomas Hertzler
- Designer: Volker Wertich
- Programmers: Volker Wertich; Dirk Ringe
- Artists: Torsten Hess; Thorsten Wallner
- Writer: Wolfgang Walk
- Composer: Haiko Ruttmann
- Series: The Settlers
- Platform: Windows
- Release: DE: November 20, 1998; UK: November 30, 1998; NA: December 20, 1998
- Genres: Real-time strategy, city-building
- Modes: Single-player, multiplayer

The Settlers III (German: Die Siedler III) is a 1998 real-time strategy video game with city-building elements for Windows. Developed and published by Blue Byte, it was released worldwide in November 1998. It is the third game in The Settlers series. In 1999, Blue Byte released two expansions, The Settlers III Mission CD and The Settlers III: Quest of the Amazons (German: Die Siedler III: Das Geheimnis der Amazonen), in April and October respectively, featuring new single-player campaign missions, new maps for both single-player and multiplayer modes, and a map editor. In June 2000, The Settlers III: Gold Edition was released, containing the original game and both expansions. In 2013, the Gold Edition was released on GOG.com, and in 2018, it was re-released as The Settlers III: History Edition.

In the game's single-player campaign, the player controls one of three races (Romans, Egyptians or Asians) whose respective deities are compelled by the great god HE to each pick a champion from among their people, and have him lead a war against the other peoples, with the gods of the two losing races facing punishment. Quest of the Amazons tells a prequel story, chronicling how Helios's daughter, Q'nqüra, becomes HIS personal assistant, engineering events so that women become the secret rulers of the universe.

The game was designed and co-programmed by Volker Wertich, creator of the original Settlers game. Although the core supply and demand-based gameplay is broadly the same as in previous titles, many of the game mechanics have been altered; the player now has direct control over their army; roads are no longer necessary to connect buildings, headquarters no longer automatically generate settlers as required, and the different races now have different economic models, different magic spells, and several unique abilities and buildings. The game was also the first in the series to feature online multiplayer.

The Settlers III received mixed reviews. Whilst the economic system and the interrelatedness of the various buildings, as well as the graphics and animations were generally praised, most critics felt it was too similar to previous Settlers titles. The game was a commercial success, selling over 200,000 units in Germany within the first twelve months of its release, and ultimately going on to sell over 700,000 units worldwide.

== Gameplay ==
The Settlers III is a real-time strategy game with city-building elements, controlled via a point and click interface, in which the primary goal on most maps is to build a settlement with a functioning economy, producing sufficient military units so as to conquer rival territories, ultimately gaining control of either the entire map or a certain predetermined section of it. To achieve this end, the player must engage in economic micromanagement, construct buildings, and generate resources.

=== Game modes ===
In the game's Campaign mode, the player must complete a series of missions, the goal of most of which is to defeat the computer controlled opponent or opponents by gaining possession of their territory. In the original release of the game, there were three separate campaigns of eight missions each; one campaign each for the Romans, Egyptians, and Asians. The Mission CD expansion added three additional campaigns of eight missions for each race, and Quest of the Amazons added two campaigns of twelve missions each; one in which the player controls the Amazons against the others, and one in which they control the others against the Amazons.

In Scenario and Multiplayer modes, the player can choose from either a randomly generated or pre-built map, and then refine the game in various ways, such as adjusting the amount of raw materials available to each player at the start of the game. The player can also select the type of game to be played, choosing from "Map Defaults" (the game is played with predetermined settings, based on the specific map), "Teams" (the player can select any combination of teams and players allowing for up to twenty players) or "No Teams" (the player can choose from "League", in which players receive points at the end of the game for ranking on Blue Byte's online league table; "Free-for-All", in which each player/race competes against one another; "Free Alliance", in which players/races can ally with one another; or "Play Alone", in which there is only one player/race). Introduced in the Quest of the Amazons expansion was "Economic Mode", in which the goal is to be the first player to complete an economic based objective.

=== Settlers and transportation ===
Screenshot of The Settlers III, showing the player's territory (the border of which is represented by red dots) at the start of a mission, with limited space and only a few buildings. The window on the left shows some of the buildings which can be built. At the bottom of the screen, in the centre, settlers are constructing a building. To the right is a small group of soldiers.

Whether playing Campaign, Scenario or Multiplayer mode, each game begins the same way; the player has a small settlement, a set amount of raw materials and tools, and a predetermined number of settlers. The basic gameplay revolves around serfs (the titular "settlers"), who transport materials, tools and produce, and who populate and perform the requisite task of each building. New settlers can only be acquired by the construction of residences. The player issues general orders (such as ordering the construction of a building), with the AI handling the delegation of orders to specific settlers.

A major change to the mechanics in The Settlers III is that players do not have to construct a road network. Instead, settlers can walk freely around the player's territory, with the AI handling pathfinding. Players can also build marketplaces, which allow for the establishment of trade routes between areas on the same geographical region, and shipyards, which allow for the manufacture of both transport ships and trade ships.

=== Races and economy ===
In the original game, the player could choose one of three races; Romans, Egyptians and Asians. Quest of the Amazons added the Amazons as a fourth race. Unlike in previous Settlers titles, each race has a slightly different economic model. For example, the Romans' and Amazons' construction industries require roughly equal amounts of wood and stone, the Egyptians' require more stone than wood, and the Asians' more wood than stone. Each race also has specific skills.

A new feature of The Settlers III is "Divine Intervention", whereby each race can call upon their deities for economic and/or military assistance. Once the player has both manna and priests, they have finite access to a number of spells, the nature of which depends on the race. These spells include tuning iron to gold, turning enemy soldiers to allies (Romans), turning fish to meat, starting forest fires (Egyptians), turning stone to iron, temporarily giving soldiers extra strength (Asians), turning gold to stone, and temporarily freezing enemies (Amazons).

=== Military ===
The player's territory can only be expanded by using pioneers or building a military complex near the territory border. Each complex must have at least one soldier garrisoned for the territory to expand. To recruit soldiers, the player must build a barracks, with each soldier requiring their requisite weapon to transition from settler to soldier. The player can also build lookout towers, which are manned by regular settlers, and which can see for great distances, but don't grant new territory.

There are three classes of soldier: swordsmen, bowmen, and spearmen. The strength of each recruited unit depends on the level of "Divine Promotion" which that class has reached, with each class requiring two promotions to reach the maximum level. Each race can also produce war machines; catapults for the Romans, ballistae for the Egyptians, cannons for the Asians, and war gongs for the Amazons.

Upon attacking an enemy building, if the player's units defeat all soldiers stationed in the building, they will occupy it, with the player's territory increasing according to the building's radius. Defense of the player's military buildings is automatic; as enemies attack, any soldiers stationed in the building defend. When soldiers are fighting within their own territory, their strength is always 100%. When they are fighting outside, their strength depends on how much gold the player has in their stockpile.

== Plot ==
The game takes place "in ages past, when the pantheon was still home to countless gods from all empires". However, it is a time when the gods have lost their purpose; Jupiter is interested only in eating and drinking; Horus thinks of nothing except his pyramids; and Ch'ih-yu simply wants to eat livestock. The story begins with HE, the "Unknown God", and creator of all gods, summoning the lesser gods to HIM, and telling them "for eons, you think only of pleasure, and now even the lowliest men say, "these drunks don't do anything for us. Let's go over their heads to the boss"". HE is afraid this will lead to monotheism, which HE wants to avoid, as HE has neither the time nor inclination to govern all of humanity himself. As a result, HE commands each of them "to pick one who is the best of your people", and have him lead a war against the other two peoples. The two gods whose people lose will be punished by repainting the universe white. Jupiter picks Septimus Marius, a sea merchant; Horus picks Ramadamses, a sculptor; and Ch'ih-yu picks Tsu-Tang, a rice farmer.

Roman Campaign

Septimus Marius begins by putting down a rebellion amongst his own men. However, shortly thereafter, his highest ranking general, Remigius, betrays him and allies with Ramadamses. Septimus attacks Remigius, defeating him and forcing Ramadamses to retreat. A powerful group of nearby pirates, led by Flavius, then ally with Septimus, and pursue Ramadamses to a small cluster of islands, several of which are controlled by Tsu-Tang. With Flavius's fleet, Septimus is able to capture many of the islands, but shortly thereafter, a volcano erupts, decimating the newly established settlements. Ramadamses reoccupies the islands and forms an alliance with Tsu-Tang. After Septimus defeats Ramadamses, Tsu-Tang encloses him, but Septimus is able to fight his way out, defeating Tsu-Tang, and achieving victory for Jupiter.

As Jupiter celebrates, Horus and Ch'ih-yu begin the task of painting the universe white, complaining that the competition was unfair, as Jupiter cheated, and the punishment is unrealistic. However, when HE threatens to also make them clean up after Jupiter's celebration party, they reluctantly begin to paint.

Egyptian Campaign

Ramadamses begins by defeating a tribe of his own countrymen. Thereafter, however, he is caught unprepared by Tsu-Tang, and must ally with a group of pirates. Together, they force Tsu-Tang to retreat, but he remains a threat. A thunderstorm then destroys several of Ramadamses's colonies, stalling his growth, and allowing Septimus to advance, and form an alliance with Tsu-Tang. Not yet strong enough to attack Tsu-Tang, Ramadamses instead disrupts their trade routes. Eventually, Ramadamses attacks Septimus, weakening him to the point where Tsu-Tang feels confident enough to betray their alliance. Ramadamses is then able to defeat Tsu-Tang, thus achieving victory for Horus.

As Horus celebrates, Jupiter and Ch'ih-yu begin the task of painting the universe white, complaining that the competition was unfair, as Horus cheated, and the punishment is unrealistic. However, when HE threatens to also make them clean up after Horus's celebration party, they reluctantly begin to paint.

Asian Campaign

Tsu-Tang begins by defeating a group of pirates allied with Ramadamses, who subsequently negotiates a fragile truce. However, both intend to violate it at the earliest opportunity. Septimus then forms an alliance with Ramadamses. Tsu-Tang advances on them, but they encircle him. He rebukes their attacks, before defeating both and achieving victory for Ch'ih-yu.

As Ch'ih-yu celebrates, Horus and Jupiter begin the task of painting the universe white, complaining that the competition was unfair, as Ch'ih-yu cheated, and the punishment is unrealistic. However, when HE threatens to also make them clean up after Ch'ih-yu's celebration party, they reluctantly begin to paint.

=== Quest of the Amazons ===
Quest of the Amazons takes place several hundred years prior to the main game. The story begins with Helios, Jupiter, Horus and Ch'ih-yu drinking in the 3 Gorgons tavern. At the encouragement of his friends, Helios is drowning his sorrows, after his son Phaethon died whilst attempting to use the sun-chariot to impress women, but was unable to control the horses. After becoming drunk, Helios is seduced by Medusa. Several years later, she is "killed in a bar fight with Perseus", and Helios learns he had fathered a daughter, Q'nqüra. Raising her himself, Helios introduces her to HE, whom she impresses with her irreverence, and when she is of age, HE makes her goddess of the Azzi. Choosing Penthesilea as their leader, she awaits as they build up their strength, ready to strike out at the male tribes.

Amazon Campaign

The Amazons begin their offensive by destroying a colony of Egyptians, overrunning a Roman encampment, and desecrating a sacred Asian mountain, prompting Jupiter, Horus and Ch'ih-yu to ally. After their initial attacks are repulsed, they are able to disrupt Penthesilea's iron production, hence her ability to create weaponry, forcing the Amazons to retreat to a more fortified position. In the newly renamed 2 Gorgons, Jupiter, Horus and Ch'ih-yu meet to discuss strategy, unaware that the Gorgons, Q'nqüra's aunts, are spying on them, and feeding details of their plan to Q'nqüra. Meanwhile, Penthesilea joins forces with a Roman tribe whose governor has fallen in love with her, and whose iron ore she needs. The Romans, Egyptians and Asians pool their remaining forces for one last offensive. However, Q'nqüra orders Penthesilea to surround and destroy them.

HE summons Q'nqüra to ask her what she wants from Jupiter, Horus and Ch'ih-yu. She tells HE: "Nothing. We don't want men rampaging around like naughty children just because they can't have their way. After all, it's your world they would destroy". Her plan is for the "Amazons to release the men and become their willing servants. Through servitude, we will gain complete control, and the men will be none-the-wiser". Impressed with this idea, HE decides to make Q'nqüra HIS private messenger, to which she replies, "I will be your humble servant", with Helios commenting "In that moment, Q'nqüra, too, had won".

3 Gods Campaign

The game begins with the Romans under attack by the Amazons, and on the brink of defeat. They barely survive, and the Amazons next attack the Asians and Egyptians in turn, prompting Jupiter, Horus and Ch'ih-yu to ally. In the newly renamed 2 Gorgons, they meet to discuss strategy, fully aware that the Gorgons, Q'nqüra's aunts, are spying on them, and feeding details of their plan to Q'nqüra. Meanwhile, the men launch an all-out offensive, although Helios is worried that Q'nqüra's response is too subdued, and she must have a plan. His concerns are ignored as the others assure him that because their enemy is a woman, there is nothing to worry about. Confidant that the Amazons are nearly defeated, Jupiter leaves Horus to fight on, whilst he pillages both Egyptian and Amazonian lands. Disgusted, Horus withdraws from the fight, and Jupiter, in a temper, cuts off his own troops, leaving Ch'ih-yu to see out the conflict alone.

HE summons Q'nqüra to ask how she was defeated, and she explains that she allowed the men to win. When HE asks why, she explains "for you. These gods and their peoples are just overgrown children. When they lose, their tantrums destroy, and it's your world they destroy". When HE asks her what her future plans are, she explains: "If my Amazons are to deny themselves comparable conquests, then they will embrace the men instead. In this embrace, control will soon be ours, and the men will never know they've lost". Impressed with Q'nqüra's cunning, HE speculates "you might be just the god I've been looking for".

== Development ==
=== Concept and design ===
Work on The Settlers III began in January 1997, prior to the release of The Settlers II: Gold Edition. Initially, Blue Byte had no immediate plans to do a third title in the series, but due to the unexpected popularity of both The Settlers and its sequel, Volker Wertich (designer and programmer of the original) and Thomas Hertzler (Blue Byte CEO and the series producer) decided to begin development. Wertich had not been involved in the making of the second game, because, as he describes it, "after two years programming The Settlers, I didn't really want to see those little men for a while". However, by 1997, he was ready to resume working on the series, eager to implement ideas which he felt would allow the game to compete with rival titles such as Warcraft II and Anno 1602.

Wertich's core design principal was to preserve the most popular elements of the Settlers gameplay but improve the graphics, and both expand and improve upon the game mechanics as much as possible. He began by going through feedback from fans of the first two games, and quickly saw two recurring suggestions; to improve the unreliable shipping system from Settlers II, and to implement online multiplayer capabilities, something he began programming immediately.

The first major design decision Wertich made related to the complexity of the game's economic system. Due to the innovations, he planned to introduce to the mechanics, and because the supply and demand-based gameplay of Settlers III was going to be more intricate than in previous titles, he felt that forcing players to concentrate too much on logistics would serve as an unwelcome distraction, and so decided to remove the need for a road network. Instead, settlers would have the freedom to move anywhere within the player's settlement, with the AI handling pathfinding. Another early decision was that the different races in Settlers III wouldn't just look different, they would have different abilities, different economic models and certain buildings unique to each one. Wertich, in consultation with Hertzler, also decided to create the game in high color, a first for the series, which had used 8-bit color for previous titles.

=== Programming and animation ===
With the basic design concepts in place, Wertich hired Dirk Ringe as his fellow programmer. Torsten Hess was then hired as the main graphics designer/artist. After making some pencil sketches outlining his basic ideas, Hess began to render the graphics in 3D Studio Max, as Wertich had decided to integrate the 2D isometric graphics of the first two games with certain 3D graphical elements. Meanwhile, Hess began work on the buildings for each race, creating textures in Adobe Photoshop, which he then "dirtied", so as to create a lived-in, real-world sense; for example, he ensured the diagonal lines of the Egyptian pyramids were crooked, as he felt to have them perfectly straight and geometrical would be unrealistic. The textures were then "hand painted", and Gouraud shading was later added to complete the look.

By July, Hess had begun working on the sketches for the individual settlers, paying particular attention to the differentiations between the same settler from different races (the specific differences between a Roman and an Egyptian baker, for example). It soon became apparent that the workload was too much for one person, and in August a second artist was hired; Thorsten Wallner, who also worked as the game's 3D modeling artist and character animator. Once on board, Wallner realised that Hess's designs were too detailed, and, as a result, were unrealisable given the current level of technology, so the pair decided to scrap them, and redesign the characters from scratch. Hess had failed to take into account that the designs of the settlers couldn't be too complex, since small details would be lost, given their size (32 pixels in height). At the same time, the designs had to be detailed enough to seem at least somewhat realistic, even at such a small size. To solve this problem, Wallner decided to exaggerate their proportions, "so that the subtleties could be recognised". He also decided to give them weapons and tools proportionally too big, as correctly sized implements would be far too small to be seen. After a week, Wallner presented his first 3D designs to Wertich and Hess (the standard Roman carriers, diggers and builders), who decided to make some additional changes, such as making the settlers more rotund and enlarging the heads.

Wallner then turned his attention to the animations. As all the animations in the game had to be interchangeable for every settler (walking, bending etc.), he first needed to work on the skeletal animation. Unsatisfied with the results when he attempted to use 3D Studio Max, he chose instead to build an "extremely primitive skeletal settler which we could put under the visible structure of our figures". The drawback to this approach was that all actions had to be animated separately, frame-by-frame.

=== Plot and cutscenes ===
In January 1998, Hess met with Blue Byte's head writer, Wolfgang Walk, to discuss the game's storyline. As it had already been decided that a new gameplay element would be "Divine Intervention", Hess suggested the plot have something to do with the gods of each culture, and the two worked out a rough draft in a single evening, based around a competition between Jupiter (Roman), Horus (Egyptian) and Chi-yu (Asian). Hertzler and Wertich approved the concept, but it quickly became apparent that the team currently working on the game would have no time to design or render any cutscenes. As a result, Hess suggested using a traditional animation studio with whom he had worked in the past, a Turkish company called Denge Animation. Subsequently, based on designs created by Hess, one of Blue Byte's in-house artists, Tom Thiel, drew sketches of the three main characters, with different facial expressions and seen from different angles, from which Denge would ultimately produce the finished animation.

=== Copy protection ===
The Settlers III was notable for its method of copy protection. Using Blue Byte's in-house copy protection system, Sysiphus, pirated copies of the game would seem to run perfectly at first. However, iron smelters would produce only pigs, residences wouldn't produce new settlers, newly planted trees wouldn't grow, goods placed at a harbour for transport would disappear, and manna couldn't be generated. In a press release issued by Blue Byte in January 1999, by which time the game had sold 500,000 units, Thomas Hertzler stated:

I knew it would do well, but was totally surprised by the quantity sold so far. Aside from the quality of entertainment The Settlers III provides, I think we can attribute partial success of sales to our copy protection. As is the case of many publishers, our sales in the past were affected due to non-existent copy protection, but our latest strict copy protection, Sysiphus, has certainly paid off. The quantity of pirated versions has been significantly reduced.

With the success of the game, and due to several other factors (for example, many pirated copies came with full artwork and instructions, and so appeared to be genuine copies, whilst even players with real copies of the game could encounter copy protection issues if they had certain viruses on their computers, or if they had older CD-ROMs), rumours began to circulate that the game was suffering from potentially game-breaking bugs, leading Blue Byte to issue a statement:

With such widespread distribution, the frequency of pirated software is increasing. Together with the large circulation of computer viruses, it has become apparent that there was a great need for information. We have expanded our ability to offer assistance. Our hotline has been extended and new technical equipment has been installed. We hope to offer the usual high level of service which Blue Byte has always maintained. We regret that the need for copy protection may lead to complications for our customers. The integration of high-quality copy protection costs energy, time and money; effort we would rather invest in the development of our products. Unfortunately, the unavoidable economic impact of illegal software leaves us with no other choice if we want to continue to bring innovative and high-quality products to the market.

== Reception ==
Reception

Aggregate score
Aggregator	Score
GameRankings	71%

Review scores
Publication	Score
Computer Gaming World	2.5/5
GameRevolution	6/10
GameSpot	6.1/10
IGN	6.9/10
Next Generation	2/5
PC Gamer (UK)	90%
PC Gamer (US)	85%
PC Games	88%
PC Player	85/100

Award
Publication	Award
Eltern	"Giga-Maus" (2000)

The Settlers III received mixed reviews, with an aggregate score of 71% on GameRankings, based on twenty-one reviews.

Writing for PC Gamer (UK), James Flynn scored the game 90%, referring to it as "a much slicker, less fiddly and wonderfully deeper challenge" than the first two titles in the series. He especially praised the complexity of the economic system, which he lauded as "a perfectly designed, hugely detailed, interlinking chain which is utterly absorbing to construct". He was also impressed with the graphics, calling it "the best looking 2D strategy game ever". His only real criticism concerned combat, which he found difficult to control.

PC Games' Petra Maueröder scored it 88%, giving it a "PC Games Award" and naming it Game of the Month. She praised online multiplayer, the differentiation between the races, the implementation of manna, and combat, writing "the depth of the game is immense, and both the graphics and the multiplayer features set new standards". Her criticisms focused on the single-player campaign (which she called "streamlined [and] monotonous"), poor pathfinding for trade ships, weak AI, and occasionally misleading mission briefings. She felt that, cumulatively, these problems suggested the game may have been rushed through the final stages of development in time for the Christmas market. However, she concluded, "The Settlers III [is] beautifully presented, quickly learned, and fun for weeks".

PC Player's Thomas Werner scored it 85 out of 100, giving it a "Gold Player" award. He criticised the interface, writing "not every icon is self-explanatory, and it takes time until you feel at home", and the occasional difficulty in locating where in the production chain there may be a problem. However, he praised the graphics, character animations, level design and the tactical aspects of combat, concluding "The Settlers 3 is the best game in the Settlers series, and the new benchmark in the city-building genre".

Writing for PC Gamer (US), Joe Novicki scored it 85%, praising the removal of roads, the enhanced combat, and the addition of online multiplayer. Of the graphics, he wrote, "the attention to graphic and animation detail sets a new standard". Although he found the pace a little too slow, he concluded, "it strikes a nice balance between the action-oriented mainstream titles and more thoughtful fare like Caesar III".

IGN's Tal Blevins scored it 6.9 out of 10, writing "Settlers III is a good game, but there's nothing really new or innovative here". Although he praised the differentiation between the races, the introduction of divine intervention, and the supply and demand-based gameplay, he cited "a slew of glaring problems which mar an otherwise brilliant game". Such problems include the inability to load a game without having to return to the main menu, the necessity for "quirky" disk swapping, the limited control of combat units, poor AI, and the inability to access the HTML manual from within an active game. He concluded "Settlers III is an entertaining and brain-heavy game that is unfortunately hampered by a number of problems".

GameSpot's Ron Dulin scored it 6.1 out of 10, arguing that it plays almost identically to The Settlers II, and citing "surface changes [which] make only a moderate improvement". He was especially critical of the similarity of the missions, writing "each mission is almost exactly the same. You start off with some supplies and must expand until you encounter an enemy". Although he praised the decision to remove roads, and the addition of online multiplayer, overall he felt the game didn't improve on its predecessors, concluding that "those who love the Settlers formula will enjoy it, but those who are unfamiliar with it will likely find it to be a moderately fun multiplayer game and an immensely repetitive single-player game".

Game Revolution's Mark Cooke scored it 6 out of 10. He praised the intricacies of the economic system, writing the "level of complexity sets Settlers III apart from other real-time strategy games". He also praised the graphics and animations, but was critical of online multiplayer mode, which he called "a disaster". He concluded by referring to the game as "interesting [and] fairly innovative".

Computer Gaming World's Samuel Baker II scored it 2.5 out of 5. Although he praised the economic system, and the complex interrelations between the various buildings, he was critical of the lack of an in-depth tutorial, the necessity to return to the main menu so as to load a new game, and overly simplistic combat. He also cited numerous bugs with the copy-protection system. He concluded: "There is something compelling about Settlers III. Many times I played longer than intended, wanting to tweak just one more thing. But in the end, the feeling of playing a loser remains".

Next Generation rated the game two stars out of five: "It's mildly entertaining to construct buildings, gather resources, and trade goods, but in the end, The Settlers III is a disappointment, lacking the creativity needed to compete in today's overcrowded RTS market".

=== Sales and awards ===
The Settlers III was a commercial success. It was the number-one-selling game in Germany in November 1998 and remained the number-two game throughout December and January. It ultimately became the German market's third-best-selling game of 1998, behind Tomb Raider III and Anno 1602. By January 1999, global sales had surpassed 500,000 units. That February, it was awarded the "Platinum Award" by the Verband der Unterhaltungssoftware Deutschland e.V. (VUD); an award given to titles costing DM55 or more, which sell over 200,000 units nationally within the first twelve months of their release. By April 1999, worldwide sales had surpassed 600,000 units, of which nearly 400,000 were sold in the German market. Blue Byte's Thomas Hertzler commented on the game's success: "I was sure The Settlers III had the potential to be a successful title. But the fact that the demand was so great completely surprised me". The game proved so popular that PC Fun, a German video game retailer, reported occasionally having more customers than game units. When the Gold Edition was released in June 2000, the original game had sold over 700,000 units worldwide.

In November 1999, the game received Silver in "Der Pädi" (Pädagogischer Interaktiv-Preis) at the 1999 Munich Bücherschau. In October 2000, it was awarded the "Giga-Maus" by Eltern magazine at the Frankfurt Book Fair. An award given to computer games, board games, interactive online features and educational programs suitable for children, The Settlers III received first place in the "PC Games for Young People Aged 13 and Over".

== Expansions ==
=== Mission CD ===
The game's first expansion was The Settlers III Mission CD, released in April 1999, and featuring three new eight-mission single-player campaigns, ten new maps for single-player mode, ten new maps for multiplayer mode, enhanced AI for computer-controlled races, and a map editor.

=== Quest of the Amazons ===
In October, Blue Byte released a second expansion, The Settlers III: Quest of the Amazons, featuring ten new maps for single-player mode, ten new maps for multiplayer mode, an improved map editor, a new race (the Amazons), and two new twelve-mission single-player campaigns, one in which the player controls the Amazons against the other three races, and one in which they control the combined forces of the others against the Amazons. The idea to include female settlers stretched back to the earliest conceptions of the game, and had always been seen as a potential idea for an expansion. Blue Byte's development manager, Erik Simon, stated of Quest of the Amazons: "Fans of the series have been bombarding us for ages with requests to finally let female Settlers pit their skills against their male counterparts. The new Amazon race will no doubt introduce some turbulence into the previously male-dominated Settlers world".

=== Gold Edition ===
Released in June 2000, The Settlers III: Gold Edition contains the original game, the Mission CD and Quest of the Amazons. It also features fan-made maps for both single-player and multiplayer modes, HTML hints and tips, a new Easy difficulty level for single-player mode (including all campaign missions), and minor graphical enhancements. The Gold Edition was released in North America under the title Ultimate Collection. In 2013, it was released on GOG.com under the Ultimate Collection banner.

=== History Edition ===
In November 2018, Ubisoft re-released the Gold Edition as both a standalone History Edition and as part of The Settlers: History Collection. Optimised for Windows 10, the re-release contains the original game and both the Mission CD and Quest of the Amazons expansions, and features autosave, 4K monitor support, dual monitor support, adjustable resolutions and sound quality, adjustable cursors and scrolling options, adjustable notifications, and online multiplayer. Available only on Uplay, the History Collection also includes re-releases of The Settlers, The Settlers II, The Settlers IV, The Settlers: Heritage of Kings, The Settlers: Rise of an Empire, and The Settlers 7: Paths to a Kingdom.
