= Rise of an Empire =

Rise of an Empire could refer to

- The Settlers: Rise of an Empire, a 2007 video game
- 300: Rise of an Empire, a 2014 movie
- Young Money: Rise of an Empire, a 2014 music compilation album
