= The Settlers: New Allies =

2023 video game

- Developer: Ubisoft Düsseldorf
- Publisher: Ubisoft
- Directors: Christian Hagedorn; Nadim Affani
- Producer: Christian Grünwald
- Designers: Patricia Kamen; Sebastian Knietzsch; Denis Prause; Maximilian Stein
- Programmer: Daniel Balster
- Artist: Edgar Bittencourt
- Composer: Chance Thomas
- Series: The Settlers
- Engine: Snowdrop
- Platforms: Windows; Nintendo Switch; PlayStation 4; PlayStation 5; Xbox One; Xbox Series X/S
- Release: Windows; 17 February 2023; Nintendo Switch, PlayStation 4, PlayStation 5, Xbox One, Xbox Series X/S; 4 July 2023
- Genres: Real-time strategy, city-building
- Modes: Single-player, multiplayer

The Settlers: New Allies (German: Die Siedler: Neue Allianzen) is a real-time strategy city-building game developed by Ubisoft Düsseldorf and published by Ubisoft. It is a reboot of The Settlers series. It was released on 17 February 2023 for Windows and on 4 July 2023 for Nintendo Switch, PlayStation 4, PlayStation 5, Xbox One and Xbox Series X/S.

== Gameplay ==
New Allies is a reboot of the series. The game features three different factions, including the Elari, the Maru, and the Jorn. Like previous games in the series, the player starts with a skeleton crew and the player must grow their settlements by collecting resources, building farms for food, and constructing military structures for both offense and defense. The game features a campaign mode and a Skirmish mode which allows both 1v1 or a 2v2 multiplayer.

== Development ==
Formally announced at Gamescom 2018, Blue Byte uses the proprietary Snowdrop Engine to develop the game. It was originally slated for release on Microsoft Windows in 2019, then rescheduled for the third quarter of 2020, but in July, the game's release was postponed indefinitely and preorders were refunded. The game resurfaced in January 2022, and a closed beta for the game was held from January 20 to 24. According to director Christian Hagedorn, the team had to redesign the game as the gameplay systems they originally designed were overcomplicated. The game was scheduled to be released on March 17, 2022 for Microsoft Windows. However, due to the feedback received during the closed beta, The Settlers team released a statement on March 3, 2022 announcing the game will be postponed to a later date, as the quality of the game was not yet in line with the team's vision.

On November 28, 2022, it was announced that the game was retitled as The Settlers: New Allies and would release on February 17, 2023, while also announcing console versions.

== Reception ==
Reception

Aggregate score
Aggregator	Score
Metacritic	54/100

Review score
Publication	Score
PC Gamer (US)	60/100

The Settlers: New Allies received "mixed or average reviews", according to the review aggregator website Metacritic.
