= The Settlers Online =

2011 video game

- Developer: CipSoft
- Publisher: CipSoft
- Platform: browser game; macOS; Microsoft Windows
- Release: September 19, 2011
- Genre: City-building; RTS
- Mode: Multiplayer; single-player

The Settlers Online (German: Die Siedler Online, known as The Settlers Online: Castle Empire in the United States) is a freemium, online browser-based version inspired by The Settlers. A beta version of the game was released in Germany, Russia, and North America on October 22, 2010, with the final build released worldwide on September 19, 2011. On April 02, 2025, it was announced that the German game developer CipSoft would be taking over running and developing the game from its original publisher, Ubisoft Blue Byte.

In the game, the player has to build a city, defeat bandit camps and complete quests to earn XP and level up, unlocking different new buildings, mines and soldiers.
