= Street network =

Connected system of roads

A street network is a system of interconnecting lines and points (called edges and nodes in network science) that represent a system of streets or roads for a given area. A street network provides the foundation for network analysis; for example, finding the best route or creating service areas.

They greatly affect in-town movement and traffic. Street networks can become very complex in cities. Street networks are very often localized, because there is little non-highway transportation from town to town. The U.S. Highway System is like a street network, but it is national, and consists of highways instead of streets and roads.

== See also ==
- Traffic
- Braess's paradox
- Transport network analysis
- Highway dimension
- Traffic flow
  - Permeability
- Grid plan
- List of cities that are inaccessible by road
