= The Settlers 7: Paths to a Kingdom =

2010 city-building and real-time strategy video game

- European cover art
- Developer: Blue Byte
- Publisher: Ubisoft
- Producer: Benedikt Grindel
- Designer: Andreas Nitsche
- Programmer: Dirk Steenpaß
- Artists: Markus Pietrowsky; Armin Barkawitz
- Writers: Xenia Hartleb; Jörg Ihle
- Composers: Dynamedion; Kariina Gretere
- Series: The Settlers
- Engine: Vision
- Platforms: Windows; macOS
- Release: WW: March 25, 2010
- Genres: City-building, real-time strategy
- Modes: Single-player, multiplayer

The Settlers 7: Paths to a Kingdom (German: Die Siedler 7) is a 2010 city-building game with real-time strategy elements for Windows and macOS. Developed by Blue Byte and published by Ubisoft, it was released worldwide in March 2010. It is the seventh game in The Settlers series. Blue Byte released three DLC packs in 2010; Uncharted Land (German: DLC Pack 1), Conquest - The Empire (German: DLC Pack 2), and Rise of the Rebellion (German: DLC Pack 3), released in July, September, and December, respectively. In March 2011, The Settlers 7: Paths to a Kingdom - Deluxe Gold Edition was released, containing the original game, the three packs, an unlock code for an upcoming fourth pack, and a copy of The Settlers III. The fourth pack, The Two Kings (German: Die zwei Könige), was released in April 2011. In 2018, the Deluxe Gold Edition was re-released as The Settlers 7: Paths to a Kingdom - History Edition.

In the game's single-player campaign, the player controls Princess Zoé of the Kingdom of Kuron. When her father, King Konradin, learns there has been a coup in the neighbouring Kingdom of Tandria, with the Tandrian king, Balderus, forced into exile, he tasks Zoé with putting down the rebellion. Making her way through Tandria, she soon encounters the leaders of the rebellion, Lord Wolvering and his most loyal knight, Dracorian. However, telling Zoé that he is a liberator, not a rebel, Dracorian claims that he is fighting to rid the Tandrian people of Balderus's tyranny, and warns her not to trust her father. The Chronicles of Tandria, a campaign included with the Rise of the Rebellion DLC, tells a prequel story depicting how and why Dracorian and his sister Rovyn first took up arms against Balderus.

In designing Paths to a Kingdom, Blue Byte explicitly set out to correct the perceived problems of the two previous Settlers titles; Heritage of Kings (which had been criticised for focusing too heavily on combat) and Rise of an Empire (which had been criticised for its overly simplistic economic models). Roughly basing the game on the most acclaimed title in the series, The Settlers II, the designers foregrounded such popular features as road networks and complex daisy-chain economic processes, whilst emphasising economic micromanagement, technology trees, and trade requirements. The designers also introduced new game mechanics, particularly a dynamic Victory Points system. Additionally, for the first time in the series, the player can choose to develop their settlement along three different lines; military, technology, and/or trade, with each one requiring different gameplay strategies and styles of play. Shortly after the game's release, it became embroiled in controversy when a fault in Ubisoft's newly launched always-on DRM prevented thousands of players from playing the game over the Easter weekend.

Paths to a Kingdom received generally positive reviews, with many critics citing it as the best Settlers game since The Settlers II. Especially lauded were the graphics, Victory Points system, mission variety, and map design. In terms of criticisms, the game's DRM problems were addressed by most reviewers, although many acknowledged the fact that these problems were not the fault of the game's designers. The single-player storyline was also poorly received. At the 2010 Deutscher Entwicklerpreis, the game won two awards; "Best German Game" and "Best Strategy Game".

== Gameplay ==
The Settlers 7: Paths to a Kingdom is a city-building game with real-time strategy elements, controlled via a point and click interface. On each map, the player is required to accomplish certain predetermined goals by building up a settlement with a functioning economy. To achieve this end, the player must engage in economic micromanagement, construct and upgrade buildings, research new technologies, establish trade routes, and gather resources. Although the game is loosely built around the same supply and demand-based gameplay as seen in previous Settlers titles, the game mechanics are quite different. Featuring a more complex economic model than the last two titles in the series, Heritage of Kings and Rise of an Empire, there is less focus on combat and more on such elements as micromanagement, daisy-chain economic processes, technology trees, trade requirements, and increasing the settlement's prestige. Additionally, for the first time in the series, the gameplay is flexible enough to allow players to develop their settlement based upon one (or more) of three basic options - military, technology, and/or trade.

=== Game modes ===
The game can be played in one of three modes; "Single-player Campaign", "Single-player Skirmish", or "Multiplayer". In Campaign mode, the player must complete a series of missions, the goal of each of which is either to achieve a predetermined number of "Victory Points" or to complete a series of missions assigned via the "Mission Board". In the original release of the game, there were twelve campaign missions. The DLC content added two stand-alone missions each with their own self-contained storyline, and a new campaign of five missions. In the main game, the early maps of the single-player campaign function as an extended tutorial, gradually introducing the player to the game mechanics. The game also features an in-game "Mentor" option, allowing players to seek the help of other players.

In Skirmish and Multiplayer modes, which can be played via a LAN or online, the player picks a map on which to play, with each map featuring different geographical features, resource distribution, and victory conditions (some maps feature a Mission Board, others feature Victory Points). Although all maps have specific predetermined victory conditions, whether Mission Board or, more commonly, Victory Points, most can also be won by eliminating all enemies. Multiplayer mode allows for up to four players, or any combination of human players and computer controlled opponents. As well as including numerous pre-designed maps for use in Skirmish and Multiplayer modes, the game also features a map editor (called Map Forge), which allows players to create their own maps, and the ability for players to build their own castles (Castle Forge).

In all modes, the majority of missions on the Mission Board are based around achieving specific economic targets, completing military objectives, reaching a certain level of technological development, or fulfilling trade requests. In Victory Point-based games, the requirements for earning Points are varied and tend to differ from map to map, although there are some common Points across all maps. Examples of Victory Points include having the largest army, minting the most coins, having the most food, capturing a specific map sector, researching specific technologies, and reaching specific trading outposts. Victory Points are either permanent (once obtained, they cannot be lost) or dynamic (can change ownership as conditions change). The number of Victory Points needed to win a map can range from four to seven, depending on the size of the map. Once a player reaches the required number of Points, a three-minute countdown begins. If the counter reaches zero, and the player still has the required number of Points, that player wins. If they lose one or more Points, the timer stops and the game continues.

=== Settlement and settlers ===
Whether playing in single-player or multiplayer mode, each game begins roughly the same way; the player is positioned at a set location on the map, with a prebuilt castle and tavern, a fully upgraded constructor, a fully upgraded storehouse, a set amount of raw materials, food, and tools, a set number of soldiers and a basic general, and sometimes a few prebuilt work-yards and/or residences. The basic gameplay revolves around serfs (the titular "settlers"), who transport materials, tools and produce, and who populate and perform the requisite task of each building. As the player constructs buildings and thus requires settlers to occupy them, the settlers automatically emerge from the castle as needed. As the settlement continues to grow in size, its quota of settlers will eventually be reached, and the player will need to build additional residences to create more living space. As in all previous Settlers titles except Heritage of Kings, the player is unable to directly control any individual settler. Instead, when the player elects to construct a building, a settler automatically emerges from a constructor, collects the necessary construction material from the nearest storehouse, travels to the site, and begins construction.

Screenshot of Paths to a Kingdom. The player is here positioning a farm, with the green squares representing locations to attach work yards, and the red square behind the farm showing there is no room for a work yard in that location. The other two red squares show that if the player places the farm here, the building in front of it cannot have work yards attached in those positions. To the right of the farm is a base building with room for three work yards.

How the player interacts with constructed buildings is different from any previous title in the series. Work yards cannot be built directly, but must be attached to a base building, of which there are five; residence, noble residence, lodge, farm, and mountain shelter. Each base building can have three work yards attached (depending on the availability of space), and each has specific yards which cannot be attached to other buildings. For example, the baker can only be attached to the residence, the blacksmith to the noble residence, the hunter's hut to the lodge, the grain barn to the farm, and the iron mine to the mountain shelter. Whereas no work yard can be upgraded, two of the base buildings can; the residence and noble residence. However, upgrading the base building does not affect the productivity of the work yard, instead it simply provides more living space, thus increasing the upper limit of settlers.

As in The Settlers and The Settlers II, an important game mechanic is the construction of a road network so as to allow for an efficient transportation system. Initially, the player can only build basic roads, but when the settlement reaches a certain level of prestige, the player can build paved roads, on which settlers move faster. Important to the road network are storehouses. When items are produced or gathered, they are deposited at the nearest storehouse. Items remain in that storehouse until they are needed for construction or demanded by another work yard, at which point they are carried to the nearest storehouse to the construction site or work yard, and then brought to their final destination. To maximise distribution, the player must build as many storehouses as possible, as they serve as transport hubs; a settler will carry an item to a storehouse and drop it off, at which point another settler will pick up the item and continue to the next storehouse, freeing the first settler to return and pick up another item at the previous storehouse. The more storehouses the player has, the less distance any individual settler will have to travel, thus allowing more items to be transported in less time. Storehouses can be upgraded twice, with each upgrade putting an additional carrier to work. Each basic storehouse has a limited storage capacity which increases at the first upgrade and becomes unlimited at the second. Fully upgraded storehouses also give players the option of ordering all items of a particular type be stored in an individual storehouse, and of ordering that no items of a particular type be stored in an individual storehouse, thus allowing players to dictate the movement of goods throughout the settlement.

=== Economy ===
The economy is under the player's control throughout the game and is adjustable in multiple ways. For example, the player can manipulate the order in which tasks are performed. The logistics panel contains four rows (building, military, clerical, and trade), and players can drag each row up and down, whilst also dragging entries within each row to the left and right. As resources are distributed from top to bottom and left to right, this means the player can focus on any individual task they wish at any given time.

The rate of work yards can also be modified by controlling the distribution of food. Although work yards attached to lodges, mountain shelters, farms, and residences don't require food, the player is free to send both "plain food" (fish and bread) and "fancy food" (sausages) to the base buildings, with plain food doubling production and fancy food tripling it. Work yards attached to noble residences require plain food to function, so if the player supplies the base building with fancy food, it will only double production. As well as raw materials, all work yards also require a worker with a tool. Unlike previous games in the series, however, there are no specific tools; instead, there is simply a universal tool used by all work yards.

=== Military, technology, trade ===
Unlike in previous Settlers titles, the player's territory can be expanded in three different ways. Every map in the game is divided into sectors, some owned by the player, some by opponents, and some neutral. In the case of neutral sectors, the player can occupy them via military, technology, or trade. Military expansion sees the player conquer new territory by defeating the sector's occupants. Technological expansion involves sending clerics to proselytise the occupants. Trade involves bribing the occupying soldiers. To conquer sectors occupied by enemy soldiers, the player must use the military option. Although each path results in gameplay significantly different from the others, with different costs for recruitment and different strategies needed to achieve victory, players are also free to attempt to develop all three.

Military
The special building for the military path is the Stronghold, from which players can recruit five types of soldier; pikemen, musketeers, cavalry, cannons, and standard-bearers (do not participate in combat, but boosts the attack of all allied units). Soldiers require a combination of weapons, food, coal, horses, wheels, and coins, depending on the unit. All soldiers must be assigned to a general, with each general capable of commanding up to thirty-five soldiers. The player begins each map with a basic general, but up to four additional generals can be purchased from the tavern, depending on the upgrade level of the Stronghold. Each general has a specific set of skills, based around melee combat, ranged combat, attacking fortifications, or a combination of all three. Players issue orders to generals, and all soldiers under that general's command automatically follow him, with the combat handled automatically by the AI.

Technology
The special building for the technology path is the Church, from which players can recruit three types of cleric; Novices, Brothers, and Fathers. Clerics require a combination of food, beer, books, and jewellery, depending on the unit. Clerics are the only settlers who can move through neutral and enemy sectors. To research new technologies, the player must send the requisite number of clerics to the necessary monastery, where they will begin research. These technologies can improve the economy, enhance the abilities of soldiers, strengthen fortifications, increase prestige, and grant Victory Points. An important aspect of research is that monasteries are not player exclusive - any player, human or computer, can use any monastery to research new technology. Once one player has done so, that technology is no longer available to other players. If one player is currently researching a technology, other players can interrupt that research by sending a higher number of clerics.

However, the players are not free to learn any technology at any time, with the Technology Board determining which technologies are available. The Board shows which technologies (if any) the player has already researched, how technologies are connected to one another, how many clerics are required to research a new technology, and how many clerics are available. When a player unlocks a new technology, any technology adjacent and connected to the researched technology can now also be researched.

Trade

Screenshot of part of the Trade Map in Paths to a Kingdom, showing how the different trade outposts are connected to one another, how many traders are required to unlock a new outpost, and what trades each outpost offers. The purple outposts have already been occupied and are now unavailable to other players.

The special building for the trade path is the Export Office, from which players can recruit three types of trader; Hawkers, Salesmen, and Merchants. Traders require a combination of clothes, jewellery, wheels, and horses, depending on the unit. Traders can move through neutral sectors but not enemy sectors, so the player must ensure an enemy does not block a path between the sector in which the Export Office is located and the marketplace (usually a port). To unlock a trade, the player must send the requisite number of traders to the corresponding outpost, with the trade then becoming available at the marketplace. Once the player has opened a trade agreement with an outpost, no other player may avail of that outpost.

However, the players are not free to trade any item for any other item, with the Trade Map determining which trades are available. The Trade Map shows with which outposts the player has opened a trade agreement (if any), what trade each outpost offers, how trading outposts are connected to one another, how many traders are required to unlock a new outpost, and how many traders are available. When a player unlocks a trade outpost, any outposts adjacent and connected to that outpost will now be reachable. To make a trade, the player must select the number of trades they wish to make. The goods are then transported to the Export Office, where the traders pick them up, carry them to the outpost, pick up what they were traded for, and then return to the Export Office.

No matter which path the player chooses, prestige is crucial, with certain buildings and options only becoming available when a specific level of prestige has been reached. The player begins each map with a few prestige points and can earn more by building prestige objects, researching certain technologies, opening certain trade routes, conquering new sectors, and building extensions to the Special Buildings. For each five prestige points, the player's prestige level increases by one, allowing them to unlock one ability on the technology tree-like prestige chart. Prestige rewards include the ability to build special buildings, upgrade to paved streets, convert miners to geologists, upgrade residences, build additional constructors, upgrade storehouses, and upgrade fortifications from wooden palisades to stone walls.

== Plot ==
Set in an early-Renaissance milieu, the game takes place in the kingdom of Tandria, where the most valued possession is the "People's Crown", given only to those monarchs who rule benevolently. However, as many of Tandria's rulers proved cruel and greedy, the Crown was locked away until such time as a worthy monarch ascends to the throne. The game begins as Princess Zoé answers a summons from her father, Konradin, king of Tandria's neighbouring kingdom of Kuron. Konradin tells her that King Balderus of Tandria has been the victim of a coup, and is now in exile. Meanwhile, the leaders of the rebellion, Lord Wolvering and his most loyal knight, Dracorian, are attempting to set themselves up as Tandria's rulers. Tasking Zoé with expelling the duo, Konradin promises her a kingdom of her own should she succeed. After she departs, however, he laughs menacingly to himself, musing, "desire, how wonderfully blinding you are".

Zoé travels to the Tandrian village of Mohnfelden, where she meets with Bors, an old friend of Konradin's, who is to act as her advisor during the campaign. As they begin moving through the kingdom, encountering those in the service of Wolvering and Dracorian, Zoé is eager to employ diplomacy, but Bors continuously counsels against it, advising military aggression. During their journey, Zoé mentions that she heard Balderus was a tyrant, but Bors is horrified, asserting that the king was simply misunderstood by his subjects.

When they encounter Dracorian, he mocks Zoé, asserting that she is only fighting because she desires the crown promised to her by Konradin, not because she actually cares about Tandria. He also warns her not to trust her father. Shortly thereafter, he is defeated in battle and captured, at which time he insists to Zoé that he is fighting a noble war in defence of the Tandrian people. With Dracorian in prison, Zoé is confronted by his sister, Rovyn. When she too is defeated and captured, she makes the same claim as Dracorian, asserting that she is fighting a noble fight in defence of the Tandrian people. Ignoring her claims, Zoé and Bors march to Konstedt, Tandria's capital, where Zoé takes the city, arresting Wolvering.

Returning to Konradin, Zoé tells him the conflict is over. He rewards her with a nearby castle rather than Tandria's throne as promised and then introduces her to King Balderus, whom she is stunned to learn is actually Bors. Realising that Dracorian and Rovyn were telling her the truth, she releases Dracorian from jail, and together they vow to remove Balderus from the throne. Incensed at her actions, however, Konradin heads to Tandria himself.

After Dracorian is injured in battle, Zoé is pushed back to the volcano Drakenau. With Dracorian acting as her advisor, Zoé faces the combined armies of Konradin and Balderus. Upon defeating them, they confront her, promising that they will have revenge. Zoé dismisses their threats and banishes them both from Tandria. Konradin mocks her, saying she'll never have a crown now, but she tells him she doesn't care, as in defending Tandria she has found something more valuable; she has learned who she really is. Some days later, as the Tandrian people celebrate, Zoé watches from the window of Konstedt Castle. Dracorian approaches her, telling her that she too should be celebrating. When she points out that Tandria is not her home, he presents her with the People's Crown and names her the rightful Queen of Tandria.

=== Chronicles of Tandria ===
Chronicles of Tandria is set just prior to the main game, as Konradin and Balderus stand on the brink of conquering Tandria. The game begins as they make a claim on Dracorian and Rovyn's family home in the province of Old Drakenau. When the siblings refuse to hand the province over, the kings declare war against them, soon capturing them both. Concerned that if they are left on the Tandrian mainland, they might stir up resistance, Konradin orders them sent to the prison islands off the northern coast.

On the prison islands, Dracorian and Rovyn are separated; she is placed in a tower, and he in a penal colony on a different island. Several months later, after careful planning, Dracorian and his fellow prisoners overcome their guards, and he heads to the island on which Rovyn is imprisoned, freeing her. As they travel back to the mainland, Dracorian points out they will need the people of Tandria's support if they are to withstand Konradin and Balderus, and so they plan to start a popular rebellion. Landing in the province of Chrysalis, the land from which King Daniel the Old first settled Tandria, Dracorian plans to use to their advantage the legend of the Forgotten Realm; a mythical place where Tandrians supposedly hid during the occupation of Moran the Feeble-Minded centuries prior. Hoping to establish his base in the Forgotten Realm, the immediate problem Dracorian faces is that the Realm's location is known only to a select few scholars in the University of Tandria in Chrysalis. With Balderus and Konradin occupying the nearby towns, Dracorian sets out to convince the university to give him the Realm's location by winning back the towns. The plan works, with Dean Aurelius of the university permitting him to study the texts that reveal the Realm's location.

Upon arriving at the location, which turns out to be a valley hidden behind the volcano Drakenau, not far from their home, Dracorian and Rovyn are met by Jakob the Guardian, who tells them that Konradin is already assaulting the Great Wall protecting the Realm. Relieving pressure on the Wall, they force Konradin back, but before he leaves, he promises them that soon he will subjugate all of Tandria. With Konradin gone, Jakob opens the gates to the Forgotten Realm, inviting Dracorian and Rovyn to make their headquarters there and build up a settlement for Tandrian refugees. Several months later, having established a settlement, welcoming any Tandrians who wish to join them, Dracorian vows that the rebellion will now begin in earnest, as they set about resisting the two kings.

== Development ==
=== Design ===
On September 7, 2009, Blue Byte advertised on their website for players to help them develop "a previously unannounced project". Asking for PC players expert in strategy, construction, and multiplayer gaming, selected candidates would be "fully integrated into the development team", and would work specifically on game mechanics and difficulty balancing. On September 22, Ubisoft officially announced the game, with Adam Novickas, director of marketing, stating, "The Settlers 7: Paths to a Kingdom brings The Settlers franchise to the next level of the strategy-sim genre, employing the core mechanisms that made the series a success while continuing to innovate in new areas that will give gamers the ability to craft their own unique, thrilling experience". In October, Blue Byte revealed that Bruce Shelley, co-designer of Railroad Tycoon and Civilization, and lead designer on the first three Age of Empires games, had been hired as a design consultant, specifically with an eye to making the game more appealing to a North American market and correcting some of the perceived problems with Heritage of Kings and Rise of an Empire. He advised the designers to make sure the player always had something to do, explaining that "in Settlers 6, I found that the computer seemed to be having more fun than I was, as I often had to wait around, becoming bored because I didn't know what to do next". He also suggested a simpler HUD than in previous games, arguing that the game should be "transparent, self-explanatory, and challenging", citing StarCraft as an example.

With Shelley's advice in mind, in the early stages of development, Blue Byte looked at Heritage of Kings and Rise of an Empire to see what didn't work. With Heritage of Kings, the series had gone in the direction of real-time strategy, with far more emphasis on combat than micromanagement or city-building. When the game wasn't well received by fans, Blue Byte addressed their criticisms in Rise of an Empire by reducing combat and focusing on city-building. However, Rise also featured a significantly simpler economic model than any previous title in the series, with little focus on the supply and demand-based daisy-chain economic processes upon which the first four Settlers titles were built. As with Heritage of Kings, Rise of an Empire was criticised by fans, with series producer Benedikt Grindel admitting, "with Settlers 5 and 6, we lost many loyal fans, despite having a larger base target group. The Settlers' fans lost out."

With this in mind, in Paths to a Kingdom, the designers looked both forward and backward - introducing new game mechanics such as the Mission Board and Victory Points, but also going back to The Settlers II in terms of the complexity of the production chains and the centrality of building a good road network (Rise of an Empire also featured roads, but they were optional). Speaking to 4players, lead designer Andreas Nitsche explained that the Victory Point system would mean combat is no longer more important than economic micromanagement: "It's always been a pity that behind every fish that was caught, every iron ingot that was cast, there was only one motivation - to fight the enemy. This situation has been changed by the Victory Point system. Now there are many ways to use your economy to win, not just annihilating the enemy; now, economic competition for technologies, trading posts, or land can lead to victory".

In January 2010, Blue Byte began a closed beta, seeking testers for the campaign tutorial missions and skirmish maps. At a press event in February, Grindel stated that the designers wanted to "return The Settlers 7 to the classic economy that fans knew well and make [it] much deeper, while keeping the gameplay more accessible for newer players".

=== Graphics ===
Graphically, the game uses the Vision game engine, relying especially on its particle system and squash and stretch-style animation capabilities. The game's cutscenes were created by ChezEddy and the in-game animations by PiXABLE. Karakter provided concept art during the game's pre-production, adhering to lead artist Armin Barkawitz's mandate for "a dreamy fairy tale look" (GameSpot's Andrew Park characterised it as the characters from Team Fortress 2 in a Shrek milieu). In March 2010, shortly before release, Blue Byte published a video showcasing the game's graphical components; "far view distance", "cascaded shadowmaps", "speedtree technology", "seasonal leaf colour tint", "screen space ambient occlusion", "3D pathfinding", "adaptive decal lod", "water lightscattering with caustics", "freely paintable waterflow", "volumetric clouds with backlighting", "squash and stretch animation", "view dependent animation lod", "dynamic weather", "glossy surface shading", "glow renderpass", "depth of field", "procedural lightning", "wind-driven, terrain-adapted vegetation", "atmospheric lightscattering", "sunray rendering", "freely adjustable snow level", "soft sprite rendering", "ambient cube lighting", and "freely paintable lavaflow".

Towards the end of development, Karakter was called back for a three-day workshop to provide some "polish" and "extra sheen" in three main areas - lighting and shadows, atmospheric effects, and textures. In relation to light and shadows, Karakter's creative director Tobias Mannewitz explains: "Shadows were achieved by simply darkening the unlit parts, but this produced a rather grim, even dirty, desolate feel at times. Instead, we suggested to change the calculation of shadows, so that they were tending towards a saturated cold colour scheme, whereas the lit parts of the buildings would be bathed in warm colours. By infusing colour into the dark spots, we could lose most of the grimness". In relation to textures, he stated:

The biggest suggested change was the modification of some of the geometry. This was not only driven by a wish for sheer beautification and visual brand-building, but by the desire to visually support gameplay. The idea was, that a settler living in a central house would go to work in adjacent workshop buildings [...] However, the visual connection between the main house and the workshops was sometimes quite weak, the functionality could be made more clear. Our suggestion was to align the main houses' roof type with the roofs of the work yards as well, and to make sure that visual narrative of those roofs illustrated the functionality of the buildings they were covering.

=== Promotion ===
In February 2010, Ubisoft announced they would be releasing the game in two editions in Germany; a standard edition and a Limited Edition (containing an in-game map and six Castle Forge pieces not found in the standard edition, a soundtrack CD, a Settlers figurine, corn, wheat, and barley seeds, and an A2 size poster). They also said that the game would be released for macOS, the first Settlers title on a Macintosh since The Settlers II. In March, Ubisoft released a demo, revealing that the game is the first in the Settlers series to feature in-game achievements, available through Uplay.

In May, a few months after the game had been released, Blue Byte published a Facebook tie-in browser game called The Settlers: My City (German: Die Siedler: Meine stadt), in which players must run a small city. In December, another tie-in game was released for iOS. A simplified version of the main game, The Settlers of Tandria (German: Die Siedler von Tandrien) is a real-time strategy game offering a single-player campaign, single-player skirmish mode, and multiplayer mode (allowing two different players to play on the same device).

=== DRM controversy ===
In January 2010, Ubisoft unveiled its plans for a new digital rights management (DRM) system, the Online Services Platform (OSP). Requiring players to open an account with Ubisoft, either via their website or by using Uplay, the OSP called for players to authenticate games upon first launching them and remain online while playing; if the network connection is lost, the game will automatically pause until the connection is re-established. When GameSpy asked Ubisoft if they expected fan backlash, Director of Customer Service and Production Planning Brent Wilkinson stated: "We think most people are going to be fine with it. Most people are always connected to an internet connection". In response to the announcement, Tim Edwards of PC Gamer wrote: "Online connectivity is never guaranteed. Pegging your ability to play a game on connection to a server somewhere else is a recipe for disaster [...] And there's no guarantee that Ubi's servers are going to work. PC gaming is littered with the corpses of launches and services that simply failed to deliver what they promised. Most depressingly, we all know this isn't going to inconvenience pirates one bit. Pirates love to break DRM".

In an official statement issued the same day, Ubisoft responded: "We know this choice is controversial but we feel it's justified by the gameplay advantages offered by the system and because most PCs are already connected to the internet. This platform also offers protection against piracy, an important business element for Ubisoft and for the PC market in general, as piracy has an important impact on this market". The first games to use the system would be Paths to a Kingdom, Silent Hunter 5: Battle of the Atlantic, and the PC version of Assassin's Creed II, all of which were scheduled for a March 2010 release. In an interview with PC Games the following day, Ubisoft stated that "this is not a pure anti-piracy software, but a new online service. The goal of this new platform is to add value to the games". In early February, Ubisoft told Gameswelt that the system would "provide added value" and "enrich the gaming experience", pointing out benefits such as players not needing the DVD to play the game after the initial installation and, because all save files would be stored on Ubisoft's game servers, gamers would be able to resume a game session from any computer on which the game is installed, assuming that computer is online.

On February 17, PC Gamer ran an article by Tom Francis, saying he had tested the OSP on both Assassin's Creed II and Paths to a Kingdom. In the article, Francis claimed that "if you get disconnected while playing, you're booted out of the game. All your progress since the last checkpoint or savegame is lost, and your only options are to quit to Windows or wait until you're reconnected". The following day, however, Ubisoft assured Ars Technica that this was not the case: "As long as you do not quit the game, the game will continue to try to reconnect for an unlimited time. Once the game is able to reconnect, you will immediately be returned to your game at the point where the connection was lost". The next day, PC Gamer ran an interview with a Ubisoft spokesman, who stated that "the real idea is that if you offer a game that is better when you buy it, then people will actually buy it. We wouldn't have built it if we thought that it was really going to piss off our customers".

In a Q&A with Gameswelt, a couple of weeks prior to the release of Paths to a Kingdom and shortly after the release of Silent Hunter 5 and Assassin's Creed II, Ubisoft stated that "we have worked hard to make sure that the requirement of an internet connection does not hinder the gaming experience. Ultimately, the system is a starting point; additional services will follow, and it is these services that will ensure that players who have a lawfully acquired version of the game can experience the full range of gameplay that would otherwise not be possible with a cracked version".

=== Release and DRM problems ===
Beginning March 31, six days after release, as with both Silent Hunter 5 and Assassin's Creed II, Paths to a Kingdom players began experiencing problems with the OSP; specifically, connection to Ubisoft's servers became erratic, rendering the game unplayable for those unable to connect. Although the problem was international, randomly affecting players across the world, it was especially pronounced in Australia. Although intermittent for most players, some were unable to play the game at all up to April 5. Even users who were able to play reported network-related crashes and hanging. Ubisoft's initial response was a generic "contact support" message and a short list of troubleshooting tips posted on their official forums. Meanwhile, PC Games reported that the DRM had already been successfully hacked by players of Assassin's Creed II.

On April 6, two weeks after release, Ubisoft made an official statement on the game's forums:

The stated goal of our server team is to operate 24 hours a day, 7 days a week with an availability of 99.5 to 99.9 percent, which corresponds to an unplanned downtime of up to 8.7 hours per year, so server failures are not commonplace, but unfortunately they do happen (albeit very rarely). There cannot be a 100 percent permanent availability guarantee. For the time being, we apologise for server failures during the Easter holidays [...] Server failures are not the order of the day, but they unfortunately do happen, nobody is immune to it and we apologise for the inconvenience and downtime that this entails. Regardless, your satisfaction and the best possible gaming experience is our most important goal, and we recognise that we need to make these new technologies even safer and more resistant, and we take that responsibility very seriously. We wish to retain you as our long term customers, and to continue to excite you with our excellent games. We therefore ask again to excuse this faux pas and hope for your leniency and understanding.

The following day, with the thread on the official forum having grown to 114 pages, with over 1,700 posts and over 22,400 views, Ubisoft told Eurogamer: "Settlers 7 players have encountered difficulties playing the game over the holiday weekend due to issues with servers that do matchmaking in multiplayer mode and that keep track of profiles, campaign progression and stats in both solo and multi modes. Our technical teams have made progress but we are not yet able to say that the issue is completely resolved".

The OSP was to be included with R.U.S.E., which was released in September 2010, but the game was DRM-free. In December, players began to notice that Assassin's Creed II and Tom Clancy's Splinter Cell: Conviction (released in April) could be played even whilst players were offline (although online registration was still required upon first launch). In January 2011, Ubisoft told Eurogamer that "the permanent online connection is no longer needed for a few of Ubisoft's titles. It is a case-by-case decision, and from the beginning, we have said that we might choose to patch out games at some point". Paths to a Kingdom, however, still required a permanent network connection. Furthermore, in October 2015, Ubisoft announced they were terminating macOS support, meaning the game is no longer playable on this platform. The DRM for Paths to a Kingdom was ultimately removed in 2018 when the game was re-released specifically optimised for Windows 10.

== Reception ==
Reception

Aggregate score
Aggregator	Score
Metacritic	79/100

Review scores
Publication	Score
Eurogamer	8/10
Game Informer	8.5/10
GameSpot	7.5/10
GamesRadar+	3.5/5
IGN	6/10
PC Games (DE)	84%

Awards
Publication	Award
BÄM! Awards	Best AI (2010)
Red Dot Design Awards	"Best of the Best" (2010)
Deutscher Entwicklerpreis	Best German Game, Best Strategy Game (2010)

Paths to a Kingdom received "generally favourable" reviews, and holds an aggregate score of 79 out of 100 on Metacritic, based on thirty-three reviews.

Game Informer's Adam Biessener scored the game 8.5 out of 10, praising the variety of map types and the range of victory conditions, and calling Victory Points "a great system that smartly emphasises the wide spread of gameplay". His main criticism concerned "a lack of feedback", arguing that in very large settlements, tracking down problems in the production chains could often be extremely difficult, as the player is not given any information on where the problem is, or often even that there is a problem. He also called the single-player storyline "execrable" and he acknowledged the DRM problems.

PC Games' Christian Schlütter scored it 84%, praising the AI and calling the characters in the single-player storyline "credible and conflicted". He also praised the mission design and the graphics, which he referred to as "lovingly designed". He concluded by calling it "the best Settlers game in a long time". However, he expressed concerns about the DRM, speculating that the controversy could very well hamper sales, undermining the work of the developers, through no fault of their own.

Eurogamer's Quintin Smith scored it 8 out of 10, calling it "ungodly compelling". Although he found the economic processes simple and "almost wholly automated", he praised the gameplay, stating that "you're constantly fixing really satisfying problems". He did, however, find that in large settlements spanning multiple sectors, "subtle flaws that the game doesn't prepare you for will occasionally bring your entire economy crunching to a halt", citing especially water shortages in isolated areas of the player's territories. Nevertheless, he found it "a worthy continuation of the Settlers series".

GameSpot's Kevin VanOrd scored it 7.5 out of 10, praising the graphics and game mechanics and citing it as "the series' most charming to date" with "a mesmerising flow that has a way of pulling you in". Although he found it less challenging and complex than Anno 1404, he generally praised the economic processes. He was a little critical of the absence of hotkeys or shortcut icons to allow players to jump to their Special Buildings, and he found the single-player campaign "laughably simple". Ultimately, he concluded that "The Settlers 7 offers something for everyone".

GamesRadar+'s Alec Meer scored it 3.5 out of 5, criticising the steep learning curve, and calling the game initially "ferociously complicated", but found it to be "exceptionally clever", stating that once the initial difficulty wears off, "it's truly impressive how balanced this thing is". Although he opined that "sometimes it seems like someone's years-in-the-making masterplan has been made flesh no matter the cost, with accessibility a distant second interest", he also acknowledged, "it's an extraordinarily thoughtful and attractive game".

IGN's Neilie Johnson scored it 6 out of 10, criticising its "Everest-like learning curve". She was also critical of the game mechanics and general map design, citing the tendency for games to begin in sectors with a relative dearth of resources. As with all other critics, she too was critical of the DRM issues. She did, however, praise the graphics, calling its aesthetic "extremely polished and unique". She concluded that "the game puts forth a friendly, inviting facade that when pulled back reveals an unforgiving gameplay system".

=== Awards ===
In June, the game was awarded a Comenius EduMedia seal and medal, an award given to ICT-based educational media. In August 2010, it won "Best AI" at the 2010 BÄM! Awards held by Computec. Also in August, it won in the "Best of the Best" category at the Red Dot Design Awards. At the Deutscher Entwicklerpreis in December it won two awards; "Best German Game" and "Best Strategy Game". The Settlers: My City also won "Best Social Game", Blue Byte won "Best Studio", and Ubisoft won "Best Publisher".

== Downloadable content ==
=== DLC Packs and Deluxe Gold Edition ===
Paths to a Kingdom received four DLC packs. In July 2010, Blue Byte released Uncharted Land, which featured three new multiplayer maps. Conquest - The Empire was released in September, featuring three new maps usable in both skirmish and multiplayer mode. In December, Rise of the Rebellion was released, featuring a new five-mission single-player campaign telling a prequel story to the main game, as well as two new maps for skirmish and multiplayer modes. The fourth pack, The Two Kings, was released in April 2011, featuring three new maps for skirmish and multiplayer modes, and two stand-alone single-player maps.

The Deluxe Gold Edition was released in March 2011, featuring the original game, all three currently available DLC Packs, an unlock code for the upcoming fourth pack, and the complete Settlers III game.

=== History Edition ===
In November 2018, Ubisoft re-released the Deluxe Gold Edition as both a standalone History Edition and as part of The Settlers: History Collection. Optimised for Windows 10, the re-release contains the original game and all DLC content, and features adjustable resolutions and online multiplayer. Also, for the first time, the DRM has been removed, meaning the player no longer has to be online to play the game (although registration is still required upon first launch). Available only via Uplay, the History Collection also includes re-releases of The Settlers, The Settlers II, The Settlers III, The Settlers IV, Heritage of Kings, and Rise of an Empire.
