= The Settlers (1993 video game) =

1993 city-building and real-time strategy video game

- European cover art
- Developer: Blue Byte
- Publishers: Blue Byte; NA: SSI (MS-DOS)
- Producer: Thomas Hertzler
- Designer: Volker Wertich
- Programmer: Volker Wertich
- Artist: Christoph Werner
- Composer: Haiko Ruttmann
- Series: The Settlers
- Platforms: Amiga; MS-DOS
- Release: Amiga: DE: June 30, 1993; UK: November 24, 1993; MS-DOS: DE: May 18, 1994; UK: May 22, 1994; NA: December 31, 1994
- Genres: City-building, real-time strategy
- Modes: Single-player, multiplayer

The Settlers (German: Die Siedler) is a 1993 city-building video game with real-time strategy elements for Amiga and MS-DOS. Developed and published by Blue Byte Software, the Amiga version was released in Germany in June 1993 and in the United Kingdom in November. The MS-DOS version was ported by Blue Byte and Massive Development. Blue Byte published this version in Europe under its original title in May 1994, but in North America, it was published in December by SSI as Serf City: Life is Feudal. In 2018, the game was re-released for Windows as The Settlers: History Edition. It is the first game in The Settlers series.

The game is set in a medieval milieu, and controlled via a point and click interface, with the primary goal on each map being to build a settlement with a functioning economy, producing sufficient military units so as to conquer rival territories, ultimately gaining control of the entire map. To achieve this end, the player must engage in economic micromanagement, construct buildings, and generate resources. The game can be played in one of two modes; a series of thirty sequential missions against computer controlled opponents of increasing difficulty, or a free-game style mode, in which the player competes in individual games involving either computer-controlled opponents, human opponents, or a combination of both.

Originally envisioned as a standard god game, similar to Populous, the concept of The Settlers was altered by the game's designer and programmer, Volker Wertich, after development had already begun. Wanting to create something unlike other titles available at the time, Wertich decided to focus on creating a game which could simulate a complex economic system, and which would feature gameplay built around a simulation of real-world supply and demand. However, due to the complexities of writing a codebase which understood and could realistically duplicate such a system, as well as ensuring the computer could handle military and economic matters simultaneously, the game required over two years of development. Wertich worked on the programming for a year, writing 70,000 lines of code, before any work began on the graphics.

The game received positive reviews and was first released on the Amiga and one year later ported to DOS due to its popularity on the Amiga. Critics especially praised the complexity of the economic system and the interrelatedness of the various buildings, as well as the graphics and sound effects. While some saw it as a god game, comparing it favourably to Populous, others saw it as a city-building game, comparing it favourably to SimCity. Others, however, felt it defined a new genre altogether by blending elements of god games and city-building games. It is often cited as one of the best Amiga games ever made. It was also a commercial success, selling over 400,000 units worldwide across both systems, considerably more than Blue Byte had anticipated. It went on to form the basis for The Settlers series, one of Blue Byte's most successful franchises.

== Gameplay ==
The Settlers is a city-building game with real-time strategy elements, controlled via a point and click interface, in which the primary goal on each map is to build a settlement with a functioning economy, producing sufficient military units so as to conquer rival territories, ultimately gaining control of the entire map. To achieve this end, the player must engage in economic micromanagement, construct buildings, and generate resources.

=== Game modes ===
The game can be played in one of two modes. The first is a series of thirty sequential missions where the player, either alone or teaming with a second player, competes against computer controlled opponents of increasing difficulty. The second is a free-game style mode, played on either a randomly generated map, or a pre-built map, based on data input by the player prior to commencing. The player can then refine the game by selecting the number of races (from two to four), choosing which commander should lead each race (there are ten different commanders, ranging from peaceful and placid to warlike and aggressive), refining the amount of raw materials available to each player at the start of the game, setting the intelligence of the settlers and knights in each race's service, and determining the rate at which each race's settlers produce items. Games involving two human players are played in split screen, with the second player using a mouse on the same PC. Two-player mode allows two players to either team up together to compete against one or two computer opponents, or compete against one another and up to two additional computer opponents.

=== Settlers and transportation ===
Whether playing a mission or a free game, each game begins the same way; the player is presented with part of the map, usually a green area on which it is easy to build, and must construct their castle/headquarters to begin their settlement. The basic gameplay revolves around serfs (the titular "settlers") who transport materials, tools and produce, and who populate and perform the requisite task of each building. As the player constructs buildings and thus requires settlers to occupy them, the settlers automatically emerge from the castle as needed. As the settlement continues to grow in size, the castle's quota of settlers will eventually be reached, and the player will need to build a warehouse to generate more settlers. At no point does the player directly control any individual settler - instead, general orders are issued (such as ordering the construction of a building), with the AI handling the delegation of orders to specific settlers.

Screenshot of The Settlers. The HUD shows part of the player's settlement, with the various buildings linked by roads. The roads are demarcated by waypoints (turquoise flags), which function as hubs for the distribution of goods, with a single settler operating between each flag.

An important game mechanic is the construction of a road network to allow for an efficient transportation system, as any settlers transporting goods must use roads. To build a road, the player must place a flag, and then manually build the road using a series of on-screen prompts advising as to the best direction in which to build. To maximize distribution, the player must set as many flags as possible on each road. Flags can only be set a certain distance apart, and serve as transport hubs; a settler will carry an item to a flag and set it down, at which point the next settler along will pick up the item and continue, freeing the first settler to return and pick up another item at the previous flag. The more flags the player has, the more settlers will operate on a given road, cutting down the distance each settler must travel, and reducing the time to transport one item and return for the next, thus avoiding item congestion at each flag. When more than one item is placed at a flag, the game has an adjustable goods priority system, which determines the order in which items are transported. Waterways can also be constructed over small bodies of water in the same manner as roads, although the settlers need boats to cross.

=== Economy ===
The economy is under the player's control throughout the game and is adjustable in multiple ways. For example, the player can control the distribution of goods by selecting how much of a given resource is transported to a given building, under five separate headings; food, wood, iron, coal and wheat. Similarly, the player can select what tools are made when; by increasing the significance of a particular tool, that tool will be produced before others. Tool production is important insofar as all buildings require raw materials and a worker with the right tool. For example, if the player has built a blacksmith, and the building is still empty despite idle settlers in the headquarters, pliers will need to be manufactured in the toolsmith.

=== Military ===
The player's territory can only be expanded by building a military complex near the territory border. Each complex must have at least one knight garrisoned for the territory to expand. Knights are automatically created from the pool of existing settlers in the headquarters, with each individual soldier requiring a sword and shield. Once knights are garrisoned, gold coins can be transported to the building to increase their morale, which allows them to fight more aggressively. They can also be promoted through five ranks, receiving training in the castle, or when stationed in a building, although they rank up slower when stationed.

The player also has control over the structure of their military, and is free to change the number of settlers who become knights, the rank of first-line defence knights, how many knights from each building can be used offensively, how many knights counter the enemy if nearby buildings are attacked, and how many knights take up positions in buildings not visible to the enemy, buildings visible but not immediately under threat, buildings under threat, and buildings about to be attacked. The player can also order lower-ranked knights to leave military buildings and return to the castle, replacing them with higher-ranked knights.

For the player to attack an enemy building, they must click on that building, and select the number of units they wish to use to carry out the attack. If the player's units defeat all soldiers stationed in the building, they will occupy it, with the player's territory increasing according to the building's radius. Defense of the player's military buildings is automatic; as enemies attack, any knights stationed in the building defend.

== Development ==
Volker Wertich, the game's designer and programmer, was initially inspired to create The Settlers by titles such as Little Computer People, Populous and SimCity. Originally, he intended the game to be similar to existing god games, with early development working to that end, but wanting to create something different, Wertich scrapped his initial concept and decided to focus on creating a game which could simulate a complex economic system, and which would feature gameplay built around a simulation of real-world supply and demand. To this end, the major innovation he introduced in The Settlers was how the game handled raw materials. In most other titles, raw materials were made available without the player having to do much in the way of producing them. In The Settlers, the player would be responsible for the raw materials upon which the economic system was built, by way of constructing and maintaining each link in the chain of production. For example, to create weapons, the player would need iron ore and coal, which could only be mined. However, for miners to be willing to work, they had to be fed, meaning the player would have to produce bread. This could only be done if the player had built a grain farm to grow crops, which would be converted into flour, and a well, which would produce water to be mixed with the flour to make bread. According to producer Thomas Hertzler, the main driving force behind much of the development was "to create an economy simulation without it being boring".

Designing a game which could simulate such a system, proved far from simple, with the game requiring two years development and programming, with much of this time "spent teaching the computer the basic facets of running an economic system". The game's project manager Stefan Piasecki further explains the reason for the lengthy development cycle was "due mainly to [the] enormous amount of data that had to be inputted. The Settlers isn't like most games where the player has just one or two characters to guide through the game. The Settlers' world is a unique place with all the elements of the real world". Wertich worked on the programming of the game for a year, writing 70,000 lines of 68000 assembly code, before any work began on the graphics.

His biggest challenge was getting the computer to understand and accurately simulate supply and demand, which, once the necessary buildings have been constructed, is handled almost entirely outside the privy of the player. Piasecki explains "if there's a windmill next to a farmer, the program has to check whether that miller has the capacity to grind his corn. If not, the corn must be taken to another mill. But what if the street is crowded? The computer then has to work out the best route for the farmer to take his goods". He further states:

Everything the human player doesn't do, the computer has to do. The people do their daily work on their own as long as the player doesn't give them orders. Essentially you have to create a computer player to aid the human player. Then you have to create a powerful computer opponent to play against; it's a lot of work for the computer as it has to manage all its little people and take military and economic considerations into account as well. As the game runs in 'real time', it can't slow down when a lot of things happen on-screen at once.

The amount of possible on-screen action in the game depended on which model Amiga the player used, with the upper limit of settlers different on different machines. An Amiga 500 was capable of supporting up to roughly 8,000 settlers, whilst an Amiga 1200 could support up to roughly 16,000, and, with additional RAM, up to roughly 64,000. More precisely, because the game works on a 16-bit integer, the maximum number of settlers possible is 65,536. As any map capable of generating so many settlers must contain four races, the most settlers one player can ever control at any one time is 16,384. Additionally, the game features twenty-five different roles that a settler can occupy, with each role resulting in a settler who looks different and is animated differently from settlers in the other twenty-four roles. Each individual settler's head is only 5x5 pixels, the space available for artist Christoph Werner to create twenty-five different looks. Furthermore, when the player zooms in, workers can be seen at work inside buildings, and sound effects change depending on where in the settlement the player is currently situated. All of this variety and variation added to the complexity when programming the game. The game's numbers are also important in open-game mode, where the player can create the world by inputting a 16-digit code, with each digit ranging from 0 to 9, allowing for roughly 270 billion combinations, hence 270 billion slightly different maps.

The game also presented programming problems when being ported to MS-DOS by Blue Byte and Massive Development. Thomas Häuser, who did quality assurance work on the game, and was promoted to project manager for The Settlers II, explains "the Amiga source code was completely undocumented. To implement it, we used a team that had written a compiler for the assembly code. With that, the Amiga source was compiled to a PC assembly code and assembled afterwards. This was, of course, very complex and prone to errors". The only significant graphical differences between the Amiga version and the MS-DOS version were that whilst the Amiga version is limited to 64 colors, the MS-DOS version uses 256 colors .

== Reception ==
Reception

Review scores
Publication	Score
Amiga Computing	93%
Amiga Force	94%
Amiga Power	88%
Amiga User International	97%
Computer Gaming World	4.5/5 (MS-DOS)
Dragon	3/5 (MS-DOS)
PC Gamer (US)	75% (MS-DOS)
PC Games (DE)	82% (MS-DOS)
CU Amiga	90%
The One	90%

Award
Publication	Award
Amiga Joker	Best Game, Best Strategic Game (1994)

The Settlers received positive reviews upon its release, especially on Amiga, where it was more widely reviewed than on DOS.

Amiga User International scored the game 97%, calling it "a true masterpiece" and "an awesome piece of programming that could only have been achieved by creative talent of the highest order". They compared it favourably to Populous, and praised it as the best god game ever made, writing "The Settlers has broken new programming ground and will be the benchmark in years to come for any up-and-coming software writer". They especially lauded the interrelatedness of the various buildings, and the complexity of the economic system. Amiga Format's Rob Mead rated it 94%, giving it an "Amiga Format Gold" award, and calling it "a major contender for the game of the year". He too praised the economic system and the connections between the buildings, saying "the game oozes quality". He also cited the graphics and sound effects as especially noteworthy.

Amiga Computing's Simon Clays scored it 93%, giving it a "Gamer Gold" award, and writing "it contains some of the most intelligent interactions between player and characters yet to be seen on an Amiga". He too lauded the economic system, the connections between the buildings, the graphics and the sound effects, and he too found the game superior to Populous, writing "with so many of this type of title knocking around, it really is refreshing to see a product that is fresh and entertaining". CU Amiga's Tony Dillon scored it 90%, giving it an "Amiga Screen Star" award. He argued it was neither a god game nor a city-building game, but was instead a new type of game which combined ideas from other genres in a way never before seen. He particularly praised the variety of gameplay, arguing "there are so many variations on the basic game, that you will wonder if you could ever play the same game twice". He also lauded the "intelligent sounds, and graphics that actually mean something".

The One's Simon Byron scored it 90%, writing "it's definitely a game you fall in love with instantly". His only criticism was the steep learning curve, arguing that on-screen labelling of the different buildings would have helped ease the player in. Amiga Power's Cam Winstanley scored it 88%, comparing it favourably to Populous, A-Train and SimCity, and writing "The Settlers is like lots of things, but still manages to be a unique game, which is truly a rare and satisfying thing to see these days". He praised the interface's use of charts and graphs, and the attention to graphical detail. He concluded by calling it "witty, imaginative and detailed, right down to the last leaf and fishing rod. It's as complex or as simple as you want it to be and thoroughly absorbing".

Computer Gaming World's Robert L. Hayes, Jr. scored the DOS version 4.5 out of 5, praising the complexity of the game's economic system and the interconnectedness of the buildings, and calling it "possibly the most realistic medieval economic model ever built into a computer system". He was also impressed with the interface, graphics, and animations. However, he called combat as dull and predictable, criticising the limited control players have. PC Player's Jörg Langer scored it 83%, finding it slightly inferior to Populous II. Although he praised the economic system, the interrelatedness of the buildings, the graphics, and the interface, he was critical of both VGA and SVGA modes, arguing that VGA mode didn't give a wide enough view, and in SVGA mode, the menus and icons were too small. He also criticised combat as "impossible to influence".

PC Games' Petra Maueröder scored it 82%. Although she praised the graphics and sound effects, she was critical of the game's repetitiveness, writing "after only a few days, the motivation drops significantly because the tasks become routine". She also criticised the pace of the game, arguing that for much of the playing time, the player is "reduced to a passive observer". She ultimately found the game inferior to SimCity 2000. PC Gamer's T. Liam McDonald scored it 75%, arguing "it's fun and modestly challenging, but it could have been better". Criticisms included a lack of humour, a confusing interface, an inability to influence combat, and a lack of gameplay depth. He concluded that "it stands as a lightweight, if entertaining game". Dragon's Sandy Petersen scored it 3 out of 5, writing, "it's no SimCity, but it was inexpensive and easy to get into."

=== Sales ===
The game was a commercial success. By June 1996, it had sold over 215,000 units worldwide across both systems, well beyond Blue Byte's expectations. By May 1998, it had sold over 400,000 units.

== Legacy ==
The game has been cited as one of the best Amiga games ever made. In Amiga Joker's 1994 Reader's Choice Awards, it won both "Best Game" and "Best Strategic Game". In 1996, Amiga Power ranked it at #25 in their "Amiga Top 100". In 2010, the Polish edition of CHIP ranked it at #1 in their "Top Ten Amiga Games". In 2011, Wirtualna Polska ranked it at #16 in their "30 best games for the Amiga".

The game formed the basis for The Settlers series, leading to nine further titles, and becoming one of Blue Byte's best-selling franchises. (Note: The other games are The Settlers II (1996), The Settlers III (1998), The Settlers IV (2001), The Settlers: Heritage of Kings (2004), The Settlers II (10th Anniversary) (2006), The Settlers: Rise of an Empire (2007), Die Siedler: Aufbruch der Kulturen (2008), The Settlers 7: Paths to a Kingdom (2010), and The Settlers Online (2011).) Upon the success of the first game, Blue Byte began work immediately on a sequel, seeking out feedback from fans, and working to address anything they disliked or felt could be improved upon. Subsequent games in the series have been released on DOS, Microsoft Windows, MacOS, Nintendo DS, iOS, webOS, bada, Symbian, Android, and online.

Outside the official series, The Settlers has given rise to two free, open source games released under the GNU General Public License. Widelands, written in C++ and built on the SDL libraries, is an ongoing project begun in 2001. Inspired by and based upon The Settlers and, to a larger extent, The Settlers II, Widelands is itself a new game with its own storyline, races, buildings, graphics and gameplay. In a 2009 review of Build13 for Linux Journal, John Knight wrote: "Widelands is a breath of fresh air in an extremely stale genre, whose roots ironically stem from way back in the past in RTS history. Whether you're chasing a fix of that original Settlers feel or just want a different direction in RTS, this game is well worth a look".

Freeserf, developed by Jon Lund Steffensen and made available at GitHub, is an attempt to reimplement the Settlers' game mechanics in C++. Begun in 2010, Freeserf still requires the original game files to work.

In August 2018, Ubisoft re-released the original game as The Settlers: History Edition, optimised for Windows 10, and featuring adjustable game speed, adjustable resolution, options for mouse, keyboard, and controller inputs, key mapping for keyboard and controller inputs, and different device support for split-screen, allowing any combination of mouse, keyboard, and controller inputs (i.e., one player can use a mouse and the other can use a controller). In November, the game was also included in The Settlers: History Collection, with the same features and Windows 10 optimisation as the stand-alone August release. Available only on Uplay, the History Collection also includes re-releases of The Settlers II, The Settlers III, The Settlers IV, The Settlers: Heritage of Kings, The Settlers: Rise of an Empire, and The Settlers 7: Paths to a Kingdom.
