= The Settlers IV =

2001 real-time strategy and city-building video game

- European Windows cover art
- Developer: Blue Byte
- Publishers: Ubi Soft; Gameloft (handheld)
- Producer: Thomas Hertzler
- Designers: Hans-Jürgen Brändle; Rainer Foetzki; Torsten Hess; Thorsten Mutschall; Marcus Pukropski; Erik Simon
- Artist: Torsten Hess
- Writers: Torsten Hess; Thorsten Wallner; Joachim Walther; Wolfgang Walk
- Composer: Haiko Ruttmann
- Series: The Settlers
- Platforms: Windows; iOS; webOS; bada; Symbian; Android
- Release: February 15, 2001: Windows; DE: February 15, 2001; EU: March 29, 2001; NA: August 6, 2001 iOS; WW: November 7, 2009 webOS; WW: April 22, 2010 bada; WW: September 13, 2010 Symbian; WW: January 25, 2011 Android; WW: May 9, 2011
- Genres: Real-time strategy, city-building
- Modes: Single-player, multiplayer

The Settlers IV (German: Die Siedler IV), released as The Settlers: Fourth Edition in North America, is a 2001 real-time strategy video game with city-building elements for Windows, iOS, webOS, bada, Symbian, and Android. Developed by Blue Byte and published by Ubi Soft, the Windows version was released in Germany in February 2001, in the United Kingdom in March, and in North America in August. Also in August, Blue Byte released an expansion, The Settlers IV Mission CD, featuring new single-player campaign missions, new maps for both single-player and multiplayer modes, a random map generator and map editor, gameplay improvements, and bug fixes. In December, they released a second expansion, The Settlers IV: The Trojans and the Elixir of Power (German: Die Siedler IV: Die Trojaner und das Elixier der Macht), containing new single-player campaigns, additional single and multiplayer maps, improved graphics, and additional gameplay tweaks. In March 2002, The Settlers IV: Gold Edition was released, containing the original game and both expansions, plus fan-made maps for multiplayer mode, and two minigames. In November 2009, Gameloft ported the original game to iOS, under the title The Settlers. Although featuring updated graphics and utilising touch controls, the gameplay, game mechanics and storyline are identical to the original. In April 2010, The Settlers was released for webOS, specifically optimised for the Palm Pre. Gameloft later released HD versions for iPad, bada, Symbian and Android. In 2013, the Gold Edition was released on GOG.com. In 2018, the game was re-released as The Settlers IV: History Edition. it is the fourth game in The Settlers series, following The Settlers (1993), The Settlers II (1996) and The Settlers III (1998).

In the game's single-player campaign, the player controls three races (Romans, Vikings and Mayans) as they initially fight one another, before joining forces to combat the much greater threat posed to each of them by the exiled god Morbus, who has been banished to Earth after instigating a failed rebellion against the great god, HE. Unable to bear touching foliage, Morbus leads the mysterious Dark Tribe as he sets about attempting to erase all natural greenery from the planet's surface. The Trojans and the Elixir of Power takes place many centuries later, when the war against the Dark Tribe has faded from memory, and the three victorious civilisations have returned to fighting with one another. However, when Morbus once more proves a threat, attempting to permanently cure his allergy to greenery by creating a powerful elixir, it falls to the Trojans to unite the others and stand against him and the Dark Tribe.

Acting on feedback from fans who had felt Settlers III was too focused on combat, the designers aimed for a return to the core supply and demand-based gameplay of the first two titles in the series. As a result, the game was designed to strike a balance between economic planning and military conquest. Although the basic gameplay remains relatively unchanged from Settlers III, some of the game mechanics have been altered. For example, for the first time in the series, the offensive strength of the player's military is tied to the economic value of their settlement; the player has access to each rank of soldier from the beginning of each mission, with the ability to select the rank of every soldier prior to recruitment; the game's single-player campaign focuses on a race that cannot be defeated solely by military means; and specialty units and squad leaders have been added to enhance the tactical aspects of combat, with warships also made available, allowing for combat at sea.

The Settlers IV received mixed reviews, with most critics feeling it was too similar to The Settlers III, and many opining that Blue Byte had failed to steer the gameplay away from an over-reliance on combat. Although the graphics and animations were generally praised, the AI, mission variety, and limited combat strategy were criticised, with reviews comparing the game unfavourably to titles such as Age of Empires II and Zeus: Master of Olympus. The handheld version received more positive reviews and was lauded for replicating the original game on a portable device, and for successfully adapting the controls to a touchscreen. The most common criticism concerned the lack of free play and multiplayer modes.

== Gameplay ==
The Settlers IV is a real-time strategy game with city-building elements, controlled via a point and click interface. The general gameplay and game mechanics are very similar to The Settlers III, and the primary goal on most maps is to build a settlement with a functioning economy, producing sufficient military and/or specialist units so as to conquer rival territories. To achieve this end, the player must engage in economic micromanagement, construct buildings, and generate resources.

=== Game modes ===
The game can be played in one of two modes; single-player or multiplayer. In single-player mode, the player can play either campaign missions or individual non-campaign games ("Free Maps"). In campaign mode, the player must complete a series of missions, the goal of most of which is to defeat the computer-controlled opponent or opponents by gaining possession of their territory, or, in the case of the Dark Tribe, by destroying their temple using gardeners. In the original release of the game, there were three separate campaigns of three missions each (one campaign each for the Romans, Vikings, and Mayans), and a fourth campaign of twelve missions in which the player controls all three races as they fight against the Dark Tribe. The Mission CD expansion added three additional campaigns of five missions for each race, plus three "Settlement" missions and three "Conflict" missions. The Trojans and the Elixir of Power expansion added three campaigns of four missions for each of the original three races, four Settlement missions, and a new campaign of twelve missions in which the player controls the Trojans against the Dark Tribe.

In Free Maps and multiplayer mode, which can be played via a LAN or online, the player chooses the map on which to play, and then refines the game in various ways, such as adjusting the number of computer controlled opponents, the amount of raw materials available at the start of the game, and/or the victory conditions. The player can also select the type of game to be played, choosing from "Conflict Mode" (each player/race competes against one another), "Ranking List" (players receive points at the end of the game for ranking on Blue Byte's online league table); "Cooperation Mode" (players combine forces to achieve a predetermined objective against computer controlled races), "Economic Mode" (the winner is the player to produce the most goods in at least four out of seven categories within a time limit), "Settlefest" (players compete on separate, but identical, single-player maps to be the first to reach a given objective), or "Free Settle Mode" (one player/race).

=== Settlers and transportation ===
Whether playing single-player or multiplayer mode, each game begins the same way; the player has a small settlement, a set amount of raw materials and tools, and a predetermined number of settlers. The basic gameplay revolves around serfs (the titular "settlers"), who transport materials, tools and produce, and who populate and perform the requisite task of each building. As in The Settlers III, new settlers can only be acquired by the construction of residences.

At no point does the player directly control any normal settler - instead, general orders are issued (such as ordering the construction of a building), with the AI handling the delegation of orders to specific settlers. However, the player can control specialist settlers, of which there are four types; pioneers (extend the player's territory by digging at the border), thieves (scout enemy territory and steal resources), geologists (test mountainous ground for raw materials), and gardeners (reclaim terrain corrupted by the Dark Tribe). When playing a multiplayer game, the player also has access to a fifth specialist unit; the Saboteur, who can attack and destroy all enemy buildings, not just military installations.

As in The Settlers III, players do not have to construct a road network. Instead, settlers can walk freely around the player's territory, with the AI handling pathfinding. Like all previous games in the series, The Settlers IV has an adjustable goods priority system, which determines the order in which items are transported. Players can also build marketplaces, which allow for the establishment of trade routes between areas on the same geographical region, and shipyards, which allow for the manufacture of warships, ferries (can transport specialist settlers, soldiers and war machines) and trade ships (can transport items from a landing dock to a different geographical region).

=== Races and economy ===
In the original game, the player controlled three races; Romans, Vikings and Mayans. The Trojans and the Elixir of Power added the Trojans as a fourth race. As in Settlers III, each race has a slightly different economic model. For example, the Romans' and Trojans' construction industries require roughly equal amounts of wood and stone, the Vikings' more wood than stone, and the Mayans' more stone than wood. Each race also has specific skills; for example, only the Romans can produce manna using only two buildings; only the Vikings can build war machines and warships which use manna rather than physical ammunition; and only the Mayans can grow agave plants in desert terrain.

The economy is under the player's control throughout the game. For example, the player can control the distribution of goods by selecting which percentage of a given resource is transported to a given building. In a similar manner, the player can select what tools are made when. Tool production is important insofar as all buildings require raw materials and a worker with the right tool. For example, if the player has built a mine, and the building is still empty despite the presence of idle settlers, a pickaxe will need to be manufactured in the toolsmith. The game also uses a notification system that alerts the player if a building cannot be occupied either due to a lack of the right tool or the absence of available settlers.

As in The Settlers III, the game features magic, whereby each race can call upon their deities for economic and/or military assistance. Once the player has both manna and priests, they have finite access to a number of spells, the nature of which depends on the race. These spells include tuning fish to stone, turning enemy soldiers to allies (Romans), turning stone to iron, temporarily freezing enemies (Vikings), turning wood to gold, turning enemy bowmen into butterflies (Mayans), turning sulphur to iron, and turning enemy soldiers into normal settlers (Trojans).

=== Military ===
The player's territory can only be expanded by using pioneers or building a military complex near the territory border. Each complex must have at least one soldier garrisoned for the territory to expand. To recruit soldiers, the player must build a barracks, with each soldier requiring their requisite weapon to transition from settler to soldier. The player can also build lookout towers, which are stationed by regular settlers, and which can see for great distances, but don't grant new territory.

Screenshot of The Settlers IV, showing terrain corrupted by the Dark Tribe, which can only be reclaimed by using gardeners on the affected areas. The context menu on the left shows the player has selected a single level 2 bowman, and their army's offensive strength is at 111%.

There are three classes of soldier common to all races: swordsmen, bowmen and squad leaders. The level of swordsmen and bowmen is set by the player prior to recruitment, with both types of soldier having three ranks, determined by the amount of gold necessary for recruitment (no gold for Level 1, one gold bar for Level 2 and two gold bars for Level 3). Squad leaders are available in only one rank, and require a sword, a suit of armour and three gold bars to recruit. As well as being stronger and having more health than a Level 3 swordsman, they also affect the troops around them; improving their formations, increasing their combat strategy, and enhancing their abilities. Additionally, if the player assigns a squad leader to a group of soldiers, orders need to be issued to the squad leader only; the squad will automatically follow him to the destination ordered by the player. Each race can also produce warships, war machines (catapults for the Romans, magical lightning generators for the Vikings, cannons for the Mayans, and ballistae for the Trojans), and special military units (medics for the Romans, axe warriors for the Vikings, blowgun warriors for the Mayans, and backpack catapultists for the Trojans). As with swordsmen and bowmen, special military units have three levels of recruitment.

For the player to attack an enemy building, they must click near that building with soldiers selected. If the player's units defeat all soldiers stationed in the building, they will occupy it, with the player's territory increasing according to the building's radius. Defense of the player's military buildings is automatic; as enemies attack, any soldiers stationed in the building defend. Any nearby soldiers will also defend the building unless ordered not to. When soldiers are fighting within their own territory, their strength is always 100%. When they are fighting outside, their strength is tied to the economic value of the settlement itself. Of especial importance in improving the strength of one's army are "Eyecatchers" (decorative monuments), which are worth double their construction value in relation to the player's military strength.

== Plot ==
The game begins shortly after the failure of a rebellion instigated by the dark god Morbus against the great god HE. For his treachery, HE banishes Morbus to Earth, Morbus's most hated place in the universe, due to its vast amounts of greenery. Unable to bear touching foliage, Morbus determines to destroy all of Earth's plant life. His dark gardener eventually develops a substance known as shadow-weed, which sucks the energy out of the land, killing all nearby foliage, and transforming the terrain into a blackened wasteland: the Dark Lands.

Meanwhile, unaware of the presence of Morbus, a war is raging between three races who have recently come into contact with one another; the Romans, the Vikings and the Mayans. The first to encounter the Dark Lands are the Romans, whose scouts return word of the effects of shadow-weed, which they initially believe to be a new Mayan weapon. As a result, the Romans attack and destroy a nearby Mayan colony, but quickly realise the Dark Lands are not the Mayans' doing. When the Mayans, who have also encountered the Dark Lands, suggest a temporary alliance, the Romans reluctantly agree. However, as they begin to investigate the Dark Lands further, the Mayans turn on them.

Elsewhere, the Vikings also encounter the effects of shadow-weed, when they discover one of their most sacred burial grounds surrounded by the Dark Lands. Setting out to reclaim their territory, they are attacked by an army of mindless soldiers. Nearby, the Romans learn the secret of how the Dark Army is created - human settlers are converted by Shamans into servants of Morbus, thus forming the Dark Tribe. They are then put to work on mushroom farms, converting mushroom spores into manna, which is transported to the nearest Dark Temple, where it is used to create the Dark Army. With this clearer understanding of the Dark Tribe, the Romans ally with the Vikings, and determine to destroy the farms.

However, the Mayans see the alliance between the Romans and the Vikings as a direct threat. Only after attacking colonies belonging to both do they realise the alliance was not focused on attacking them, but on combating the Dark Tribe. By this time, however, they find themselves surrounded by the Dark Lands. Despite their previous animosity, the Romans and the Vikings save the Mayans, and the three unite, going on the offensive in an effort to wipe out the Dark Tribe.

Eventually, the Vikings locate what they believe to be the final Dark Temple. They destroy it, but the remnants of the Dark Tribe survive, and rally for a final battle. Secure in the knowledge that one more victory is all that is required, the Mayans launch an attack. They prove victorious, and with all of the Dark Tribe's temples and farms eradicated, and no way of breeding new troops, Morbus retreats to his lair. Begging HE for mercy, Morbus is horrified to see vines infesting the building, quickly wrapping themselves around him, and turning him to stone.

=== The Trojans and the Elixir of Power ===
The Trojans and the Elixir of Power begins many centuries after the events of the main game. Morbus remains in a petrified state in territory now controlled by the Trojans, who are unaware of the other races, of Morbus's identity, or of the war against the Dark Tribe. The story begins when Morbus's assistant, Q'nqüra, spreads shadow-weed around the statue, releasing him. When the Trojans discover the statue gone and the effects of shadow-weed spreading, they elect to abandon the area. Landing on a new island, they encounter friendly Romans and hostile Mayans. Allying with the Romans, the Trojans tell them of the disappearance of Morbus's statue, and the Romans tell them the history of the war, and call a meeting of all four races. They are all shocked, however, when they learn the Dark Tribe are now using aerial vehicles, dubbed manacopters, to easily infiltrate their lines and inflict huge losses.

After the Romans, Vikings, and Mayans are all attacked, the Trojans are tasked with destroying the Dark Tribe's research lab and, with it, the manacopter blueprints. When they raid the lab, they discover Morbus's plan; his dark gardeners are attempting to create an elixir to cure his inability to touch greenery by using a complex combination of herbs, and are only one herb from a final breakthrough.

The four races divide the land up into sectors to search for the final herb, and shortly thereafter, the Vikings locate it. Their priests begin to harvest it, but the Dark Tribe soon arrive, and the Trojans develop a poison to use on the herb should the Vikings be unable to harvest it in time. The Viking priest is ambushed and killed, and the Dark Tribe acquire the herb, but it remains unclear if the priest was able to use the poison before his death. Meanwhile, Morbus's temple is located, and the Trojans lead an assault. They succeed in destroying it, but not before Morbus can create and drink the elixir. Emerging from the ruins of his temple to see the greenery surrounding it, he laughs and declares "nothing can stop me now". Suddenly, he sneezes as he is engulfed by mist, revealing that the Vikings have succeeded. The game then cuts to some time later; on the site of the temple now stands a small cottage with a garden full of blooming flowers. Morbus then emerges from the cottage and happily attends to his garden, fully cured of his hatred of foliage.

== Development ==
=== Announcement and gameplay ===
The Settlers IV was announced by Blue Byte at the ECTS in August 1999. Volker Wertich, who had created The Settlers series, and designed and programmed both the original Settlers and The Settlers III, was not involved in development, because, as he later explained, "Blue Byte wanted to have it ready for release by Christmas 2000, which, in my opinion, was not sufficient time to create a worthy title".

The game was first shown at the E3 event in May 2000, where Blue Byte stated that gameplay would emphasise economic planning over military conquest. Citing negative feedback from fans who felt Settlers III was too combat-orientated, the designers intended the new game as a return to the core supply and demand-based gameplay of The Settlers and The Settlers II. They also revealed the game would feature three playable races (Romans, Vikings and Mayans) and a new non-playable race (the Dark Tribe). Speaking of the importance of the Dark Tribe to the economic-based gameplay, project manager and co-designer Hans-Jürgen Brändle explained:

Unlike previous opponents in the Settlers series, it will not be possible to defeat the Dark Tribe only by military means. The recultivation of the barren lands is an important component in the strategy against the dark menace and emphasizes our efforts to reposition the settling aspect of the game in the foreground. Without having to dampen any features of the military units, we have managed to find our way back to our roots.

In an interview with GamesZone, Brändle further stated, "we have made sure there is a balance between settling and combat with virtually every rule change and new feature". Addressing why the game would feature nearly identical economic processes as Settlers III despite the refocused gameplay, he explained: "The majority of the feedback gave us a clear understanding that the economy in Settlers is simply great as it is, and that the game should not be artificially inflated with new goods or people. The fun, the ease of playing, should not be overwhelmed by unnecessarily complex contexts".

Speaking to IGN later in the year, Brändle reiterated the designers' hopes that the game would more fully integrate economic-based settling with combat than had the previous title:

We are mainly concentrating on getting the balance between settling and fighting just right. We're introducing new features, which will make the settling part more important but will also influence the strategic fighting part. This will mean you can't concentrate on just settling, or only fighting like some people did with earlier versions. We had a lot of feedback from our users who said that they liked the settling part in Settlers III, but as soon as they went online they found that they have no chance to play this part of the game effectively because there were so many players focusing on fighting and aggression.

Of the three races in the game, Brändle explained the developers chose the Romans as they were a "traditional" Settlers race, the Vikings as they were the most fan-requested race, and the Mayans as they needed a race that used more stone than wood in their construction industry, and because the developers felt that the Mayans are a somewhat historically mysterious culture.

=== Graphics ===
In the GamesZone interview, Brändle also addressed the issue of the similarity in graphics between the new game and Settlers III: "We have deliberately programmed an engine that is very much like the previous one. We wanted to make the fans feel like they were back in the familiar world of The Settlers".

As with Settlers III, the buildings in the game were created using 3D Studio Max, with Adobe Photoshop used to create the textures. Each race was assigned its own specific artist, who worked on nothing except the buildings for that particular race. According to lead artist/co-designer/co-writer Torsten Hess, this was done "so that the style of the buildings within a people is uniform". However, there were certain overriding rules to which the individual artists had to adhere. One of the most important was a technique Hess had employed on Settlers III; after the textures were applied, they were "dirtied" so as to create a lived-in, real-world sense. Hess explains, was: "Rigid and straight edges should be avoided. Beautiful curves and moving lines are instead used to suggest life in the settlers world. For the textures, this means stronger colours, a slightly higher contrast than the figures, as well as a lot of detail and the use of many different colour families. We definitely want to avoid a sterile look. We also draw all the textures by hand".

For the settlers themselves, the designers also used the same basic techniques as developed on Settlers III; the figures couldn't be too graphically complex, since small details would be lost, given their size (32 pixels in height). At the same time, the designs had to be detailed enough to seem at least somewhat realistic, even at such a small size. To solve this problem, the settlers' proportions were exaggerated, and their weapons and tools were designed so as to be proportionally too big, as correctly sized implements would be far too small to be seen. For the process of animating the settlers, character animator/co-writer Thorsten Wallner explains, "We place a skeleton behind each settler, which controls the movement sequences. Each skeleton dictates the standard movements, such as bending, running or standing. Additional animations can then be added to individual characters. With this technology, we do not need to animate every settler anew, but only add additional animations".

=== Promotion and delay ===
In July 2000, Blue Byte advertised for 5,000 participants for an online closed beta. However, the beta was postponed in early August, due to "technical issues related to the lobby software causing disruption to Battle Isle: The Andosia War". In late August, Blue Byte revealed it would be at least mid-September before the beta began.

In October, Blue Byte released "Smack a Thief", a minigame designed to promote the main game. A variation on Whac-A-Mole, in "Smack a Thief", the player must click on Viking thieves before they can raid the Roman stores and escape. Available as a free download from Blue Byte's website, the game allowed players to upload their high scores to a global high score table.

In early November, the online beta was cancelled, with Blue Byte stating, "We have decided to take this step to concentrate on completing the game. Conducting a large, public beta test requires a lot of additional resources, which we now want to invest more specifically in development. Quality assurance will instead be ensured by our own internal testing department". In an interview with Planet of Games, Brändle clarified: "We do not have the resources to filter and sort all of the anticipated feedback from a beta test. We are currently concentrating exclusively on completion of the product".

The following week, Blue Byte announced the slated December release had been pushed back to January 2001, with Thomas Hertzler (Blue Byte CEO and the series producer) explaining, "we know that many gamers were particularly looking forward to The Settlers IV this year and, of course, we understand if Settlers's fans are disappointed. In the end, however, we made our decision with the players in mind. The Settlers IV will not be on shelves before Christmas, but fans will receive a game that corresponds to Blue Byte's high quality standard".

=== Release and Ubisoft takeover ===
In January, the German release date was pushed back to February 15. On February 6, Ubi Soft acquired Blue Byte, revealing their plans to publish the game internationally, with president and CEO, Yves Guillemot, stating:

I am particularly happy with this acquisition. Germany is the country par excellence of strategy games, and Blue Byte's teams are the leading specialists in the field. Our goal is to invest in Blue Byte and to make available to them any tool they need to extend the influence of their leading products. Together we will endeavor to see to it that, having garnered such enormous success in Europe, these wonderful games will soon captivate players around the world.

On February 15, the game was released in Germany as planned. However, it suffered from numerous bugs, leading to a negative reaction from fans, and criticism of both the game and Blue Byte in the German gaming press. Although Blue Byte issued a patch the same day the game was released, it introduced additional problems, leading to further negative press. A second patch was released four days later to correct the problems introduced by the first patch. According to German magazine PC Games, 76% of players experienced technical difficulties with the release version of the game. Co-designer Thorsten Mutschall later admitted it had not been ready for release in February and should have been held back for additional playtesting and programming.

On March 19, Ubi Soft announced the game would be released throughout Europe at the end of the month, explaining "the reasons behind the unfortunate delay of the product were essentially quality assurance issues".

Screenshot of The Settlers HD on Symbian, showing how the game's controls and HUD have been ported to a touchscreen device; the mail icon on the top left is for notifications, the building icon on the bottom left brings up the building menu (which is further subdivided into different menus for different types of building), the greyed out image on the bottom right is to select any speciality settlers, and the star icon on the top right is to display the mini-map.

=== Portable versions ===
In November 2009, working in conjunction with Blue Byte, under license from Ubisoft, Gameloft ported the game to iOS, released under the title The Settlers. In April 2010, the game was ported to webOS, specifically optimised for use with the Palm Pre. In September, Gameloft released HD versions for iPad and bada (optimised for the Wave S8500). The Settlers HD was later released for Symbian in January 2011, and for Android in May.

Although the handheld versions of the game feature updated graphics, the gameplay and game mechanics are identical to the original, with the storyline including the full twenty-one single-player missions from the original release (three Roman missions, three Viking missions, three Mayan missions, and a twelve mission Dark Tribe campaign). The main change to the game involves the HUD, which was redesigned so as to accommodate touchscreen controls.

For example, rather than the building menu always present onscreen, it is accessed by pressing an icon which opens the "Build Menu". From within this menu, the player then has access to various submenus, such as "Basic Buildings", "Food Buildings" and "Military Buildings". Similarly, to access the menu to control specialist settlers, the player touches another icon, which is only available if the player has any such settlers available. Pressing down on any icon for two seconds brings up a brief help screen for that icon, and pausing the game allows the player to access a full help menu, replacing the "Extended tool tips" which appeared on-screen in the original.

== Reception ==
Reception

Aggregate scores
Aggregator	Score
GameRankings	71% (PC); 79% (iOS)
Metacritic	74/100 (PC); 73/100 (iOS)

Review scores
Publication	Score
Computer Gaming World	3/5
GameSpot	6.4/10
GameSpy	67/100
IGN	7/10
PC Gamer (US)	72%
PC Games	77%
PC Player	85/100
148Apps	4/5
All About Symbian	76%
AppSpy	5/5
Pocket Gamer	4/5 (iOS); 3.5/5 (bada); 4/5 (Android)
TouchArcade	4/5 (iOS)

The Settlers IV received "mixed or average" reviews, with an aggregate score of 74 out of 100 on Metacritic, based on five reviews, and 71% on GameRankings, based on seventeen reviews. The iOS version was received more positively, with an aggregate score of 79% on GameRankings, based on six reviews.

PC Player's Damian Knaus scored the original game 85 out of 100, giving it a "Gold Player" award. Although he was impressed with the Dark Tribe, he criticised the integration of gardeners into the gameplay, calling them an "unnecessary extravagance". He was also critical of the lack of any "real innovations" and the absence of female settlers. However, despite these reservations, he felt the game was the best Settlers title thus far, and was especially impressed with the graphics.

PC Games' Rüdiger Steidle scored it 77%, the lowest score the magazine had ever given to a Settlers title. The issue in which the review appeared had both an editorial justifying the score, and a text box within the review, titled "Why only 77%", in which the magazine wrote:

For this review, Blue Byte sent us the final sales version of The Settlers IV, which, frustratingly, carries the same amount of bugs as the early beta versions. There were crashes almost from the start, unexplained problems with the construction of temples, and multiplayer games ending mid-game [...] On the day of release, the magazine immediately began to receive complaint mail, the forums at Blue Byte were buzzing with the reactions of angry customers - and the complaints were promptly removed [...] PC Games is reminding Blue Byte that any company abusing the trust of their fan-base are betraying those same fans.

In his review, Steidle criticised the game's similarity to Settlers III, writing that "Blue Byte has not altered the concept at all". Although he praised the graphics, the tutorials, and the variety of mission objectives, he was critical of the bugs, writing, "in typical Blue Byte fashion, the game has appeared in time for the first patch". He concluded that "anyone who is, like me, a fan of the series, will be disappointed".

PC Gamer's Jim Preston scored it 72%. Although he praised the economic system on which the game is built, he criticised the lack of variety within it, writing, "you're forced to create the entire supporting infrastructure for your settlement the same way every time." He also referred to the gameplay as "complication masquerading as depth".

IGN's Dan Adams scored it 7 out of 10, comparing it unfavourably to Zeus: Master of Olympus. His biggest criticism concerned the lack of differentiation from Settlers III, writing that "aside from some improved graphics and small additions, it's hard to tell this is really a new game". He was also critical of the AI, pathfinding, and repetitive missions, and he felt the designers had failed to steer the gameplay away from an over-reliance on combat. While praising the graphics, animations, and the game's "great personality", he concluded: "Blue Byte hasn't managed to find [any] new ideas that might keep the series from becoming the serious pool of stagnant gaming that it is quickly becoming".

GameSpy's Bernard Dy scored it 67 out of 100, comparing it unfavourably to Age of Empires II. Like Adams, he felt it was too similar to Settlers III, and although he praised the "appealing" graphics and "fascinating" animations, he felt Blue Byte had failed to return the gameplay to an economic focus, writing "nearly every scenario is a race to build a military". He also criticised the AI, lack of combat strategy, and mission variety. He did, however, praise Free Settle and multiplayer modes, concluding that "Settlers: Fourth Edition has charming moments, but has been long surpassed by games with better character and superior combat".

GameSpot's Ron Dulin scored it 6.4 out of 10, finding similar problems to Adams and Dy, and comparing it unfavourably to Impressions Games' City Building series. Finding it too similar to Settlers III, he felt Blue Byte had failed to move away from a reliance on combat. He also criticised the mission variety and the lack of combat strategy, writing, "it's never more complex than moving all of your units slowly through enemy territory, hoping you'll have some left after your opponent doesn't". Although praising the basic supply and demand-based gameplay and the graphics, he wrote "The Settlers: Fourth Edition is really just the same old game with the same old problems".

Computer Gaming World's Mark Asher scored it 3 out of 5, criticising "scenarios that differ in only minor ways", and arguing the best part of the game was Free Settler mode. Although he praised the graphics and called the game a "pleasant enough experience", he noted it offered no major differences from previous Settlers titles, and would interest only the existing fanbase, who, he opined, may be getting bored of the same formula.

=== Sales ===
The game was a commercial success, and 2001's highest selling German-developed game. In February 2002, it was awarded the "Platinum Award" by the Verband der Unterhaltungssoftware Deutschland e.V. (VUD); an award given to titles costing DM55 or more, which sell over 200,000 units nationally within the first twelve months of their release. By August 2002, the game had sold over 300,000 units in Germany.

=== Portable ===
AppSpy's Andrew Nesvadba scored the iOS version 5 out of 5, praising the graphics and touchscreen controls: "The Settlers is everything great about strategy games. It's easy enough to jump in and muck around while progressing, but ultimately there's a complex and amazingly detailed set of interactions for players to learn". Arron Hirst of 148Apps scored it 4 out of 5. Although he was critical of the lack of free play and multiplayer modes, he praised the controls and the replication of the original game mechanics, saying "the game is both immersive and addicting". TouchArcade also scored it 4 out of 5, criticising the lack of free play, but praising the graphics and sound effects, and calling the game "a solid experience".

Pocket Gamer's Tracy Erickson scored it 4 out of 5, giving it a "Silver Award", and calling it "surprisingly good" and "largely positive". Although he was critical of the lack of free play and multiplayer modes, and felt the playing area was oftentimes too cluttered with icons and menus, he concluded by praising the "deep economic strategy gameplay".

Pocket Gamer's Wayne Turton scored the bada version of The Settlers HD 3.5 out of 5, giving it a "Bronze Award" and praising the tutorials, controls, and graphics. In contrast, he was critical of the absence of non-campaign missions and multiplayer mode, and of the combat system, writing victory "usually comes down to which side can field the most units". He concluded, "there's a magical quality to The Settlers HD that draws you in, and a depth that will keep you playing". All About Symbian's Ewan Spence scored the Symbian version 76%. Although critical of the AI, and feeling that the screen becomes too cluttered, especially during combat, he concluded that "it hits all the required marks in a game like this". Pocket Gamer's Brendan Caldwell scored the Android version 4 out of 5, giving it a "Silver Award", and calling it "an almost resounding victory". Although critical of the tutorials, which he felt didn't adequately explain the intricacies of the game, and the controls, which he argued "don't quite have the accuracy or speed to truly emulate the traditional mouse and keyboard setup," he concluded, "with a depth not often enjoyed by Android titles, Settlers HD can be an enthralling game".

== Expansions ==
=== Mission CD ===
The game's first expansion was The Settlers IV Mission CD, released in Germany in August 2001, and featuring three five-mission single-player campaigns, three "Settlement" missions (focusing on building up the player's settlement and achieving economic goals, as opposed to military conquest), three "Conflict" missions (focusing on combat), sixteen new maps for single-player mode, and eighteen new maps for multiplayer mode. In terms of gameplay, the Mission CD features improved AI, more varied mission objectives, more sophisticated scripting within missions, and higher difficulty in single-player games. The expansion also features a random map generator, and map editor, and numerous bug fixes and stabilisations.

=== The Trojans and the Elixir of Power ===
Blue Byte released a second expansion, The Settlers IV: The Trojans and the Elixir of Power, in December, featuring thirteen new maps for single-player mode, thirteen new maps for multiplayer mode, three new four-mission single-player campaigns for each of the original three races, four Settlement missions, and a new twelve-mission campaign, in which the player controls a new race, the Trojans. The expansion also features improved graphics, adjustable difficulty, and the random map generator and map editor included with the Mission CD. In terms of gameplay, the importance of eyecatchers has been modified. Whereas in the original game, the player could increase their offensive strength beyond 100% by building enough eyecatchers, or by building large numbers of a single eyecatcher, in The Trojans and the Elixir of Power the maximum offensive strength achievable is 100%, which can only be reached if the player builds at least one of every eyecatcher.

=== Gold Edition ===
Released in March 2002, The Settlers IV: Gold Edition contains the original game, the Mission CD and The Trojans and the Elixir of Power. It also features fan-made maps for multiplayer mode, the "Smack a Thief" minigame, a new minigame ("The Dark Side"), Microsoft Windows wallpapers, and Settlers-themed skins for Winamp and ICQ. In 2013, the Gold Edition was released on GOG.com.

=== Die Neue Welt and Community Pack ===
Blue Byte later released two German-language expansions. In November 2002, they released Die Siedler IV: Die Neue Welt (English: The Settlers IV: The New World). Set shortly after the Vikings discover America, the game begins with the Mayans organising a feast for the Vikings, before travelling to Europe with the aim of taking possession of the Wonders of the World, beginning with the Colossus of Rhodes. The Vikings, meanwhile, discover a map amongst the Mayans' possessions leading to a mythological island inhabited only by women, which they promptly set out to find. The Trojans, having been expelled from Troy by the Romans, are searching for a new homeland, and so head west. At the same time, the Romans are attempting to reconquer the world, beginning with the newly discovered continent. The expansion features four five-mission single-player campaigns (one for each of the three original races, and one for the Trojans), each with multiple objectives, many of which are optional, and most of which are economic-based rather than military-based. There are also two new single-player maps, and three new multiplayer maps, all with enhanced graphics and textures.

In November 2003, they released Die Siedler IV: Community Pack. The expansion features four fan-created single-player campaigns based on real historical conflicts; the Roman attack on Carthage during the Third Punic War, the Viking invasion of England, the Huaxtec resistance against Spanish Conquistadors, and the battle for Troad during the Wars of the Diadochi.

=== History Edition ===
In November 2018, Ubisoft re-released the game as both a standalone History Edition and as part of The Settlers: History Collection. Optimised for Windows 10, the re-release contains the original game, the Mission CD, The Trojans and the Elixir of Power, Die Neue Welt, Community Pack, and the "Smack a Thief" minigame, and features autosave, 4K monitor support, dual monitor support, adjustable resolutions and texture quality, vertical synchronization, and online multiplayer. Available only on Uplay, the History Collection also includes re-releases of The Settlers, The Settlers II, The Settlers III, The Settlers: Heritage of Kings, The Settlers: Rise of an Empire, and The Settlers 7: Paths to a Kingdom.
