= Render layers =

When creating computer-generated imagery, final scenes appearing in movies and television productions are usually produced by rendering more than one "layer" or "pass," which are multiple images designed to be put together through digital compositing to form a completed frame.

Rendering in passes is based on a traditions in motion control photography which predate CGI. As an example, for a visual effects shot, a camera could be programmed to move past a physical model of a spaceship in one pass to film the fully lit beauty pass of the ship, and then to repeat exactly the same camera move passing the ship again to photograph additional elements such as the illuminated windows in the ship or its thrusters. Once all of the passes were filmed, they could then be optically printed together to form a completed shot.

The terms render layers and render passes are sometimes used interchangeably. However, rendering in layers refers specifically to separating different objects into separate images, such as a layer each for foreground characters, sets, distant landscape, and sky. On the other hand, rendering in passes refers to separating out different aspects of the scene, such as shadows, highlights, or reflections, into separate images.
