= Resource =

Source or supply from which benefit is produced

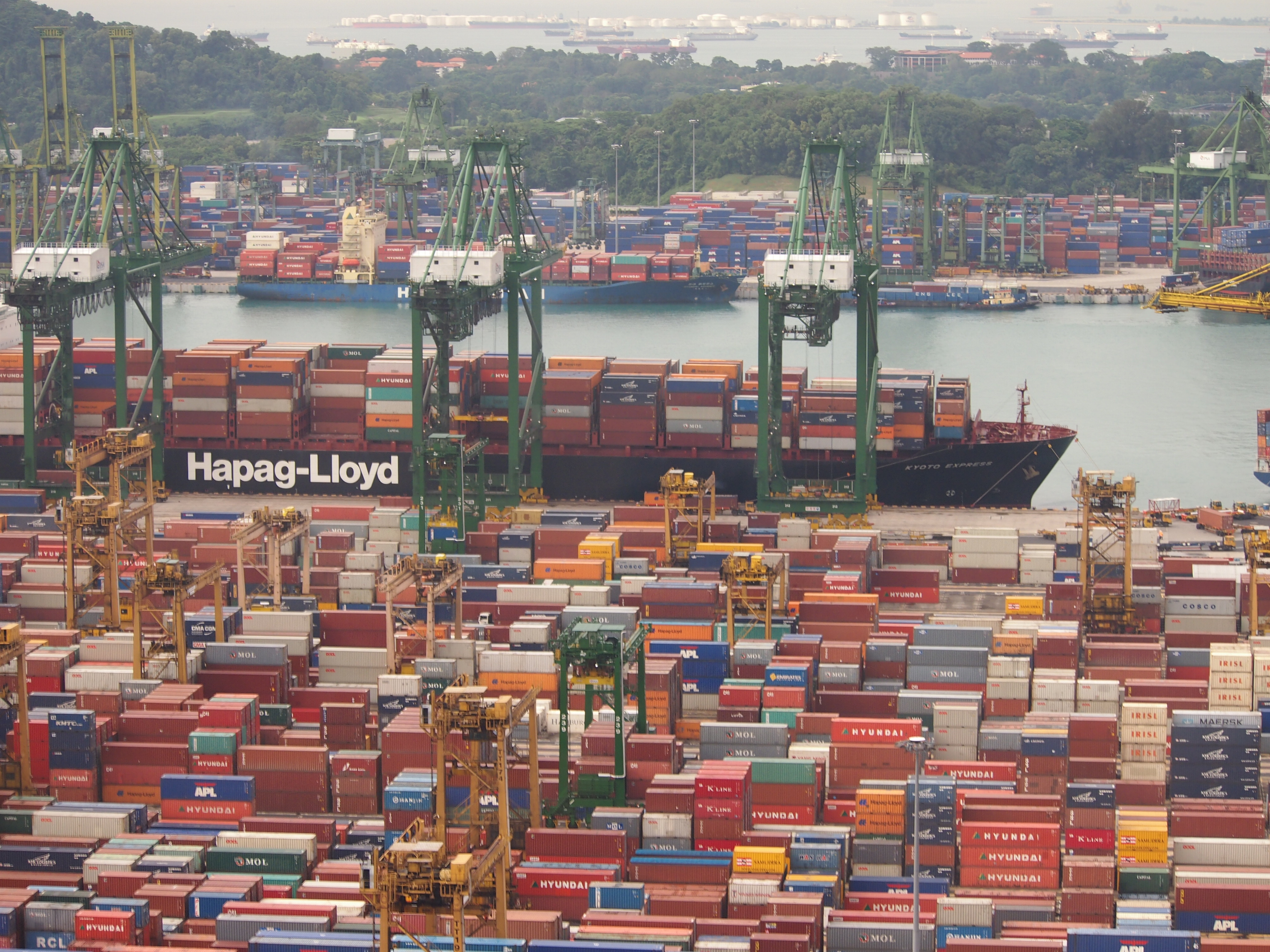
Many types of resources are transported with the international shipping system.

Resources are all the materials available in the environment which are technologically accessible, economically feasible and culturally sustainable and help to satisfy needs and wants. There are many types of resources, which can broadly be classified according various parameters, such as their availability as renewable or non-renewable resources or national and international resources. An item may become a resource with technology. The benefits of resource utilization may include increased wealth, proper functioning of a system, or enhanced well-being. From a human perspective, a regular resource is anything to satisfy human needs and wants.

The concept of resources has been developed across many established areas of work—in economics, biology and ecology, computer science, management, and human resources, for example—linked to the concepts of competition, sustainability, conservation, and stewardship. In application within human society, commercial or non-commercial factors require resource allocation through resource management. Abundance of resources on the planet does not mean abundance in every particular place due to poverty and social-economic inequality.

The concept of resources can also be tied to the direction of leadership over resources; this may include human resources issues, for which leaders are responsible, in managing, supporting, or directing those matters and the resulting necessary actions. For example, in the cases of professional groups, innovative leaders and technical experts in archiving expertise, academic management, association management, business management, healthcare management, military management, public administration, spiritual leadership and social networking administration.

== Definition of size asymmetry ==
Resource competition can vary from completely symmetric (all individuals receive the same amount of resources, irrespective of their size, known also as scramble competition) to perfectly size symmetric (all individuals exploit the same amount of resource per unit biomass) to absolutely size asymmetric (the largest individuals exploit all the available resource).

== Economic versus biological ==
There are three fundamental differences between economic versus ecological views: 1) the economic resource definition is human-centered (anthropocentric) and the biological or ecological resource definition is nature-centered (biocentric or ecocentric); 2) the economic view includes desire along with necessity, whereas the biological view is about basic biological needs; and 3) economic systems are based on markets of currency exchanged for goods and services, whereas biological systems are based on natural processes of growth, maintenance, and reproduction.

== Computer resources ==
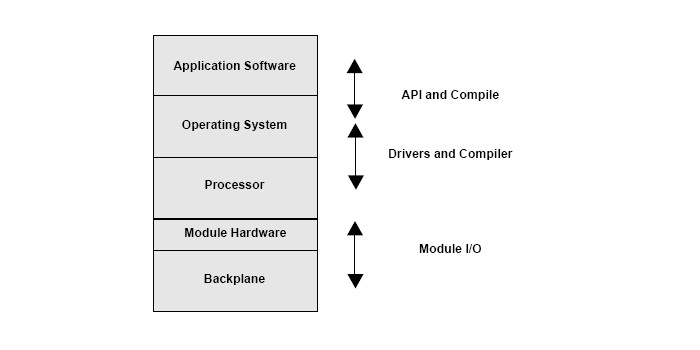
Diagram of computer resources

A computer resource is any physical or virtual component of limited availability within a computer or information management system. Computer resources include means for input, processing, output, communication, and storage.

== Natural ==
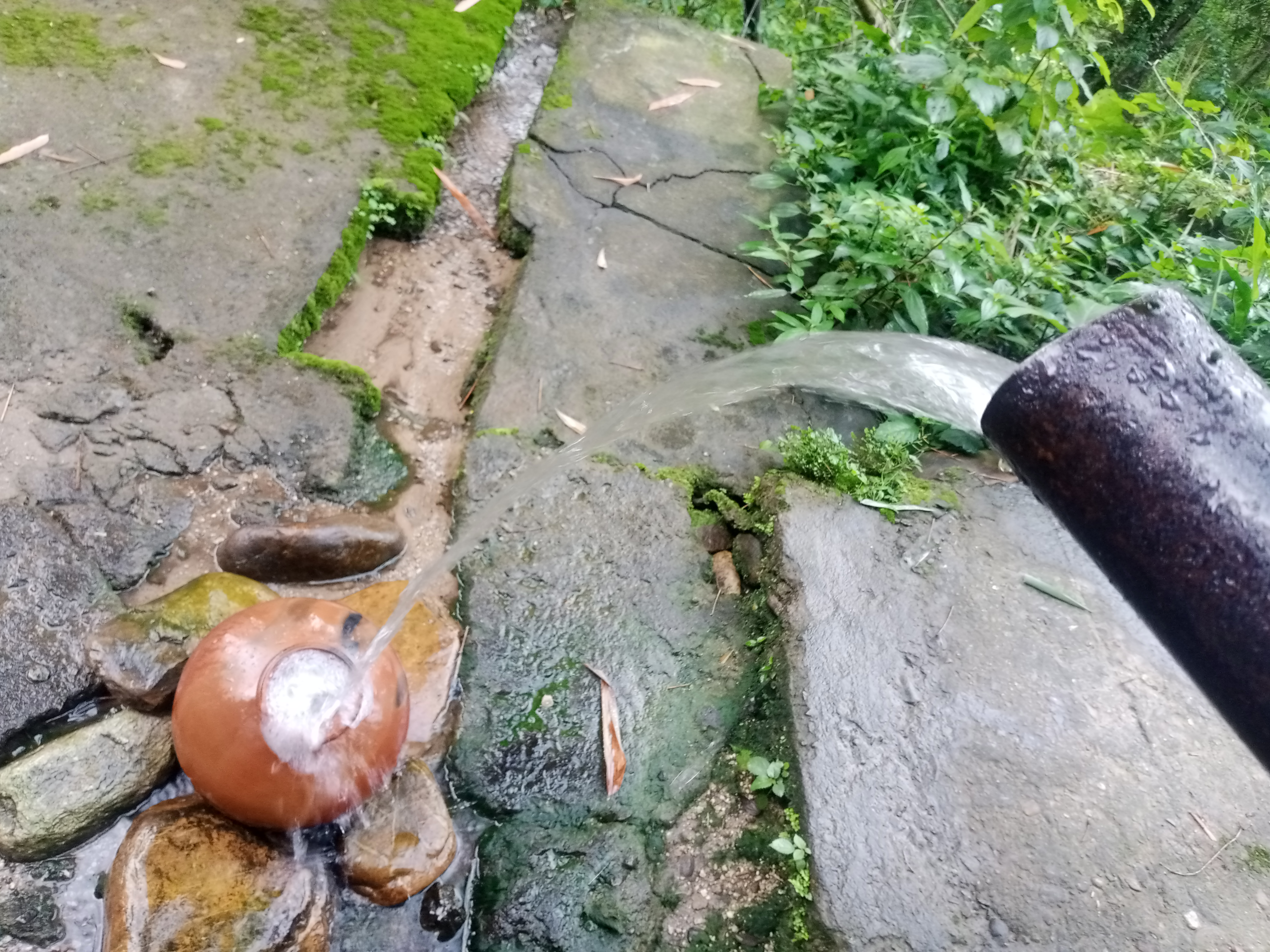
Underground water, a natural resource, seen here coming out of a pipe in Himachal Pradesh, India

Natural resources are derived from the environment. Many natural resources are essential for human survival, while others are used to satisfy human desires. Conservation is the management of natural resources with the goal of sustainability. Natural resources may be further classified in different ways.

Resources can be categorized based on origin:

- Abiotic resources comprise non-living things (e.g., land, water, air, and minerals such as gold, iron, copper, silver).
- Biotic resources are obtained from the biosphere. Forests and their products, animals, birds and their products, fish and other marine organisms are important examples. Minerals such as coal and petroleum are sometimes included in this category because they were formed from fossilized organic matter, over long periods.

Natural resources are also categorized based on the stage of development:

- Potential resources are known to exist and may be used in the future. For example, petroleum may exist in many parts of India and Kuwait that have sedimentary rocks, but until the time it is actually drilled out and put into use, it remains a potential resource.
- Actual resources are those, that have been surveyed, their quantity and quality determined, and are being used in present times. For example, petroleum and natural gas are actively being obtained from the Mumbai High Fields. The development of an actual resource, such as wood processing depends on the technology available and the cost involved. That part of the actual resource that can be developed profitably with the available technology is known as a reserve resource, while that part that can not be developed profitably due to a lack of technology is known as a stock resource.

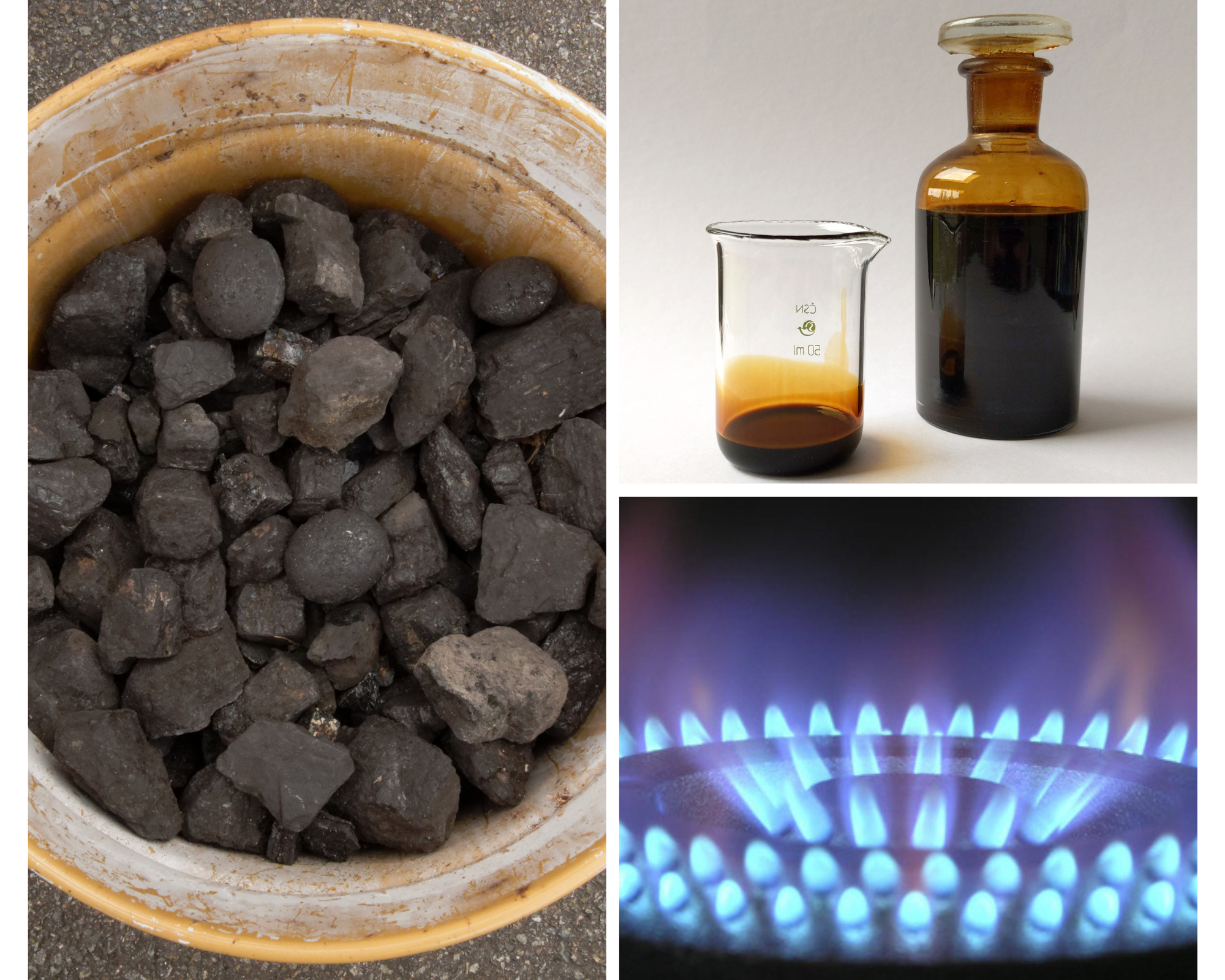
Various fossil fuels, a nonrenewable resource - oil, coal, and natural gas

Natural resources can be categorized based on renewability:

- Non-renewable resources are formed over very long geological periods. Minerals and fossils are included in this category. Since their formation rate is extremely slow, they cannot be replenished, once they are depleted. Even though metals can be recycled and reused, whereas petroleum and gas cannot, they are still considered non-renewable resources.
- Renewable resources, such as forests and fisheries, can be replenished or reproduced relatively quickly. The highest rate at which a resource can be used sustainably is the sustainable yield. Some resources, such as sunlight, air, and wind, are called perpetual resources because they are available continuously, though at a limited rate. Human consumption does not affect their quantity. Many renewable resources can be depleted by human use, but may also be replenished, thus maintaining a flow. Some of these, such as crops, take a short time for renewal; others, such as water, take a comparatively longer time, while others, such as forests, need even longer periods.

Depending upon the speed and quantity of consumption, overconsumption can lead to depletion or the total and everlasting destruction of a resource. Important examples are agricultural areas, fish and other animals, forests, healthy water and soil, cultivated and natural landscapes. Such conditionally renewable resources are sometimes classified as a third kind of resource or as a subtype of renewable resources. Conditionally renewable resources are presently subject to excess human consumption and the only sustainable long-term use of such resources is within the so-called zero ecological footprint, where humans use less than the Earth's ecological capacity to regenerate.

Natural resources are also categorized based on distribution:

- Ubiquitous resources are found everywhere (for example, air, light, and water).
- Localized resources are found only in certain parts of the world (for example metal ores and geothermal power).

Actual vs. potential natural resources are distinguished as follows:

- Actual resources are those resources whose location and quantity are known and we have the technology to exploit and use them.
- Potential resources are those of which we have insufficient knowledge or do not have the technology to exploit them at present.

Based on ownership, resources can be classified as individual, community, national, and international.

== Labour or human resources ==
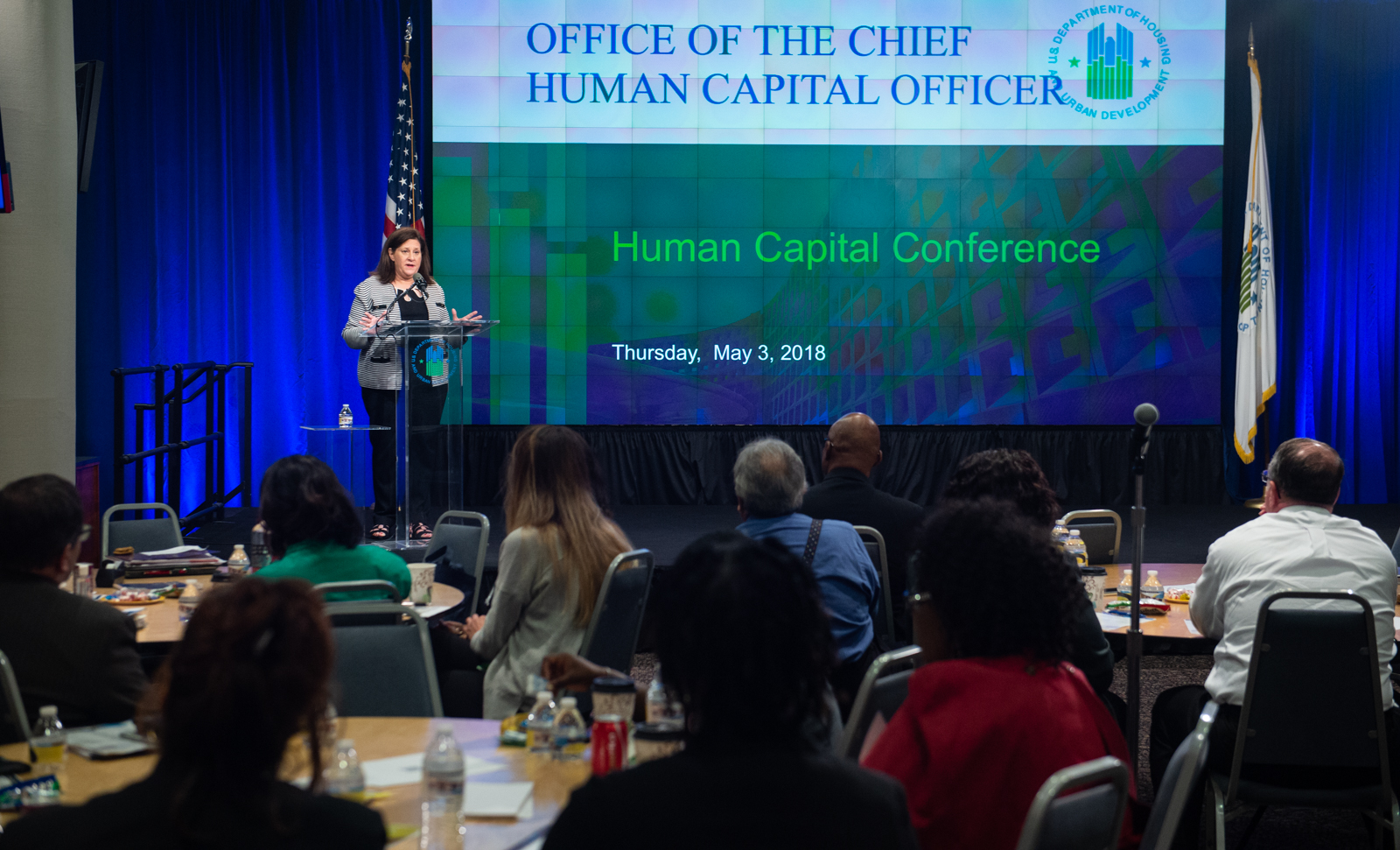
The 2018 OCHCO Human Capital Conference

In economics, labor or human resources refers to the human work in the production of goods and rendering of services. Human resources can be defined in terms of skills, energy, talent, abilities, or knowledge.

In a project management context, human resources are those employees responsible for undertaking the activities defined in the project plan.

== Capital or infrastructure ==
In economics, capital goods or capital are "those durable produced goods that are in turn used as productive inputs for further production" of goods and services. A typical example is the machinery used in a factory. At the macroeconomic level, "the nation's capital stock includes buildings, equipment, software, and inventories during a given year." Capitals are the most important economic resource.

== Tangible versus intangible ==
Whereas, tangible resources such as equipment have an actual physical existence, intangible resources such as corporate images, brands and patents, and other intellectual properties exist in abstraction.

== Use and sustainable development ==
Typically resources cannot be consumed in their original form, but rather through resource development they must be processed into more usable commodities and usable things. The demand for resources is increasing as economies develop. There are marked differences in resource distribution and associated economic inequality between regions or countries, with developed countries using more natural resources than developing countries. Sustainable development is a pattern of resource use, that aims to meet human needs while preserving the environment. Sustainable development means that we should exploit our resources carefully to meet our present requirement without compromising the ability of future generations to meet their own needs. The practice of the three R's – reduce, reuse, and recycle must be followed to save and extend the availability of resources.

Various problems are related to the usage of resources:

- Environmental degradation
- Over-consumption
- Resource curse
- Resource depletion
- Tragedy of the commons

Various benefits can result from the wise usage of resources:

- Economic growth
- Ethical consumerism
- Prosperity
- Quality of life
- Sustainability
- Wealth

== See also ==
- Natural resource management
- Resource-based view
- Waste management
