= Mev Dinc =

Turkish-British video game designer

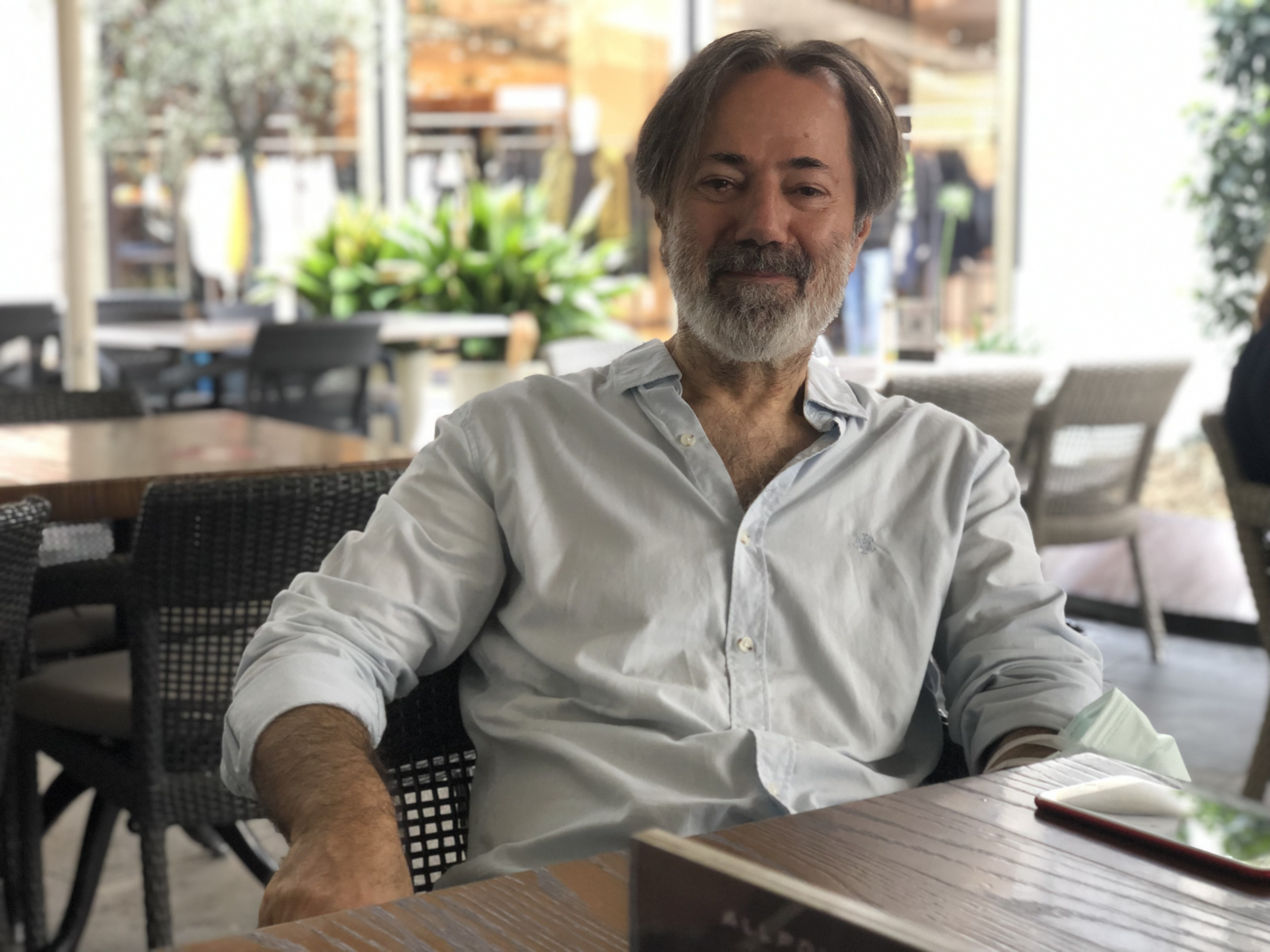
- Dinc in August 2021
- Born: Mevlüt Dinç; May 1957 (age 69); Ordu, Turkey
- Occupation: Video game designer
- Years active: 1983–present
- Known for: Vivid Image, Sobee Studios

Mevlüt Dinç (born May 1957), better known as Mev Dinc, is a Turkish-British video game designer. Born and raised in Turkey, he moved to England in 1979 while finishing his studies, intending to pursue a master's degree there. Unable to pay the high tuition fees for international students, Dinc worked in a cable factory in Southampton, where a colleague introduced him to video games and got him a ZX Spectrum when it was released in 1982. Dinc taught himself to program via magazines and began working in the video game industry in 1983, starting with assisting on the Commodore 64 conversion of Ant Attack, released in 1984. After his first original game, Gerry the Germ Goes Body Poppin', in 1985, he worked with Electric Dreams Software on another original game, Prodigy, the Amstrad CPC port of Enduro Racer, and various tie-ins with films and TV series.

After leaving Electric Dreams, Dinc co-developed Last Ninja 2 for System 3 and, together with former System 3 employees Hugh Riley and John Twiddy, founded Vivid Image in September 1989. After moving back to Turkey in 2000, Dinc founded Dinç İnteraktif (later renamed Sobee Studios), which he sold to Türk Telekom in 2009 and subsequently left in 2013. Dinc has received several awards for his work and is a member of the British Academy of Film and Television Arts.

== Early life ==
Mev Dinc was born Mevlüt Dinç in May 1957 in Ordu, Turkey, to a family of Georgian descent. He grew up in a remote village 40 miles (64 km) from the city and studied economics at the Ankara Academy of Economics and Commercial Sciences. During this time, he married an English woman and moved to England in 1979, travelling back-and-forth between the two countries to complete his education later that year. He eventually adopted the short name "Mev", citing that "no one could say it properly" in England. After graduating, Dinc pursued a master's degree in England but, due to the high tuition fees for international students at the time, could not afford to finish it. From 1980, Dinc worked for the Southampton cable factory of Standard Telephones and Cables. A colleague from the factory, Vino Dos Santos, introduced Dinc to video games via his ZX81, but Dinc showed no interest in games or computers. When the ZX Spectrum was released in 1982, Dos Santos pre-ordered one each for himself and Dinc, despite Dinc's continued lack of interest. When Dinc eventually unboxed his ZX Spectrum, he struggled to understand the enclosed instruction book for the BASIC programming language. He instead taught himself to program over the course of two years via programming magazines, particularly Popular Computing Weekly. Dinc cited the 1983 game Arcadia, which he examined as part of his learning, as major influence.

== Career ==
=== Early games ===
Dinc began working in the video game industry in 1983, after leaving the cable factory. He responded to an advertisement from programmer Paul Fik, who was looking for a ZX Spectrum developer, and helped him convert the game Ant Attack from the ZX Spectrum to the Commodore 64. The port was released in 1984, and Dinc used this development to get insights into the Commodore 64, which he would use for his later games. In the same year, he and Jon Dean founded the Society of Software Authors, a trade association that was to provide "practical advice" for developers in the game industry. The society had its inaugural meeting on 5 May 1984 in Ilford. Dinc acted as its chairman. Dinc's first original game was Gerry the Germ Goes Body Poppin', in which the player controls a pathogen that invades a human body. He initially pitched the game to publisher Mirrorsoft (part of the Mirror Group conglomerate), which rejected the game, citing the reputation of the Mirror Group. Dinc later met Tony Rainbird, the managing director for the Firebird publishing label. Although Dinc considered the British Telecom (which Firebird was part of) more respectable than the Mirror Group and therefore thought that the label would reject his game, Rainbird was fond of the idea and agreed to publish it. Dinc entirely developed the ZX Spectrum and Amstrad CPC version and had Edwin Rayner, whom he had met in Southampton, create a Commodore 64 port. Although released in 1985 as a budget-price title, Gerry the Germ sold well, generating "quite a lot of royalties", especially in the United States.

Following Gerry the Germ, Rainbird asked Dinc to create another game for the publisher. However, he had come in contact with Dean and Rod Cousens (whom he had known through the Ant Attack conversion), who at the time were establishing Electric Dreams Software for Activision. Dean requested Dinc to develop his second game with them instead, which he accepted given a satisfactory offer and the company's location in Southampton. Dinc's second game, 1986's Prodigy, had the player care for an infant. He described the game as ambitious but difficult to program. Subsequently, Cousens and Dean persuaded Dinc to develop a port of Enduro Racer, originally an arcade game, from the ZX Spectrum to the Amstrad CPC, which he agreed to despite his disinterest in such projects because Electric Dreams had offered him "really good money". Dinc met with the developers of the ZX Spectrum, who attempted to explain their development concepts. He considered their work far more complex than and his and instead requested the original source code, using which he simulated the ZX Spectrum version on an Amstrad CPC. After the port was released in 1986, Dinc became involved with two video game adaptations for movies: Big Trouble in Little China for the Amstrad CPC and ZX Spectrum had been left unfinished by another developer, and Dinc was asked to rescue the project within two months. Afterwards, he worked on the original Commodore 64 version of Aliens: The Computer Game, where he again worked alongside Rayner. Dinc's last project with Electric Dreams was Knightmare, a 1987 adaptation of the TV series of the same name.

=== Vivid Image ===
After Knightmare, Dinc left Electric Dreams. At the time, System 3 was struggling to convert its game The Last Ninja from the Commodore 64 to the ZX Spectrum. With Activision as its publisher, Cousens landed Dinc a job with the company to handle the port. However, Dinc did not want to work off someone else's code and instead suggested that the company formally cancel The Last Ninja for the platform and instead announce that the sequel, Last Ninja 2, would be simultaneously released for the Amstrad CPC, Commodore 64, and ZX Spectrum. As the company followed this recommendation, Dinc worked on the Amstrad CPC and ZX Spectrum versions, alongside artist Hugh Riley and programmer John Twiddy, who developed the Commodore 64 version. After the game's 1988 release, Dinc decided to start his own company. Twiddy and Riley joined him, and they established Vivid Image in September 1988.

The company's debut game was Hammerfist, released in 1990 and followed shortly by Time Machine. Dinc considered both ambitious projects, but he ultimately was not satisfied with either. He further developed a version of Hammerfist for the Konix Multisystem, a console Dean was involved in. Dinc completed this version before the platform's release was cancelled, to his disappointment. The studio's next game, First Samurai, was what Dinc thought "finally hit the level" that Vivid Image's founders had intended for the studio. Inspired by the Last Ninja series, the game starred a samurai in place of a ninja and changed the isometric perspective to a side-on view. The game's name was chosen as a parody of Last Ninja. First Samurai was released for various platforms in 1991. An expanded sequel, Second Samurai, came out in 1993.

During the development of First Samurai, Vivid Image ran into financial hardships following the death of Robert Maxwell, the owner of Mirrorsoft's group of companies. Mirrorsoft had gone into receivership and ceased further payments. Their agreement entailed that Vivid Image retained the intellectual property of the game and that the contract could be terminated in the event of receivership or bankruptcy. Looking to generate revenue quickly, Vivid Image struck a deal with Ubi Soft to publish First Samurai on personal computers and developed a port within three months. Furthermore, the developer reached out to Cousens, who was now heading Acclaim Entertainment's European branch, for help. Through Acclaim, Vivid Image was able to work with Japanese publisher Kemco to secure a deal for a First Samurai port on the Super Nintendo Entertainment System. After several meetings with Kemco's managing director, Masahiro Ishii, they reached an agreement crucial to the Vivid Image's survival. Riley eventually left the company in 1993 and John Twiddy returned to System 3 shortly thereafter.

Vivid Image collaborated with Ubi Soft on two racing games: Street Racer and S.C.A.R.S.. The former, published in 1994, was designed after Super Mario Kart and incorporated original characters, including one based on Nasreddin Hodja, a historical satirist well known in Turkey. Dinc had envisioned a 3D adventure game for the PlayStation revolving around Hodja, which he was to develop with Raffaele Cecco, the Rowlands brothers, and others. However, the game was never released and led to Dinc falling out with some of those involved. S.C.A.R.S. was released in 1998. According to Dinc, the game's graphics, including the race track designs, were produced in-house by Ubi Soft, making them "too short and too difficult", which "ruined the game". Also in 1998, Vivid Image began work on Actor, a 3D game demo, using the Dynamic Toolkit by MathEngine, an Oxford software company. The demo was first shown off in 2000 as part of a promotion of the Pentium 4 line of central processing units. A "mystery-and-adventure game" also called Actor was to be released for the PlayStation 2 in 2001. By 2000, Dinc felt as though he had reached the peak of his career in the UK. Eidos Interactive had decided to cancel all of its PlayStation projects, resulting in the cancellation of Street Racer 2. Dinc had to decide whether he should take on further projects and raise his family in the UK or return to Turkey. He chose to return to Turkey, which at the time lacked a professional games industry, and believed that establishing a games scene there would make him "feel proud again". Vivid Image became formally based in Istanbul and developed Dual Blades for the Game Boy Advance, published by Metro3D in October 2002.

=== Dinç İnteraktif / Sobee Studios ===
Working out of the Software Development Centre at the Istanbul Technical University, Dinc founded Dinç İnteraktif in 2000. By April 2001, Dinc had hired Will Cowling and Ben Donnelly, who joined him from England, as well as Engin Cilasun and Bager Akbay; Dinc expected to eventually grow the studio to 45–50 people. Dinç İnteraktif was renamed Sobee Studios in 2004. In association with MyNet, Sobee developed two of Turkey's first major online games, one about football club management and one about billiards. The latter saw contributions from Turkish professional billiards player Semih Saygıner. Upon release in 2004, the two games attracted 1 million users. Further games included İstanbul Kıyamet Vakti, Turkey's first massively multiplayer online game in 2006, and the football game I Can Football in 2009. Dinc sold Sobee to Türk Telekom, at the time under Paul Doany's management, in March 2009 and continued as the studio's general manager. Under Dinc, Sobee developed Süpercan, I Can Football 2, and Süpercan 2. As Doany was replaced shortly after the acquisition, Dinc, unhappy with the new management's stance towards Sobee, left the studio in 2013.

=== Later work ===
Dinc was the founder and first elected president of the Turkish Digital Games Federation, established as part of the Turkish Ministry of Youth and Sports in August 2011. This federation was eventually folded into the ministry's Emerging Sports Branches Federation. In 2016, Dinc moved to London, where he established Pixel Age Studios with the intent of remaking his earlier games. That studio was dissolved in June 2021. In 2020, Dinc published a Turkish-language autobiography, Life Is a Game, donating all proceeds to Darüşşafaka Society. An English version was released in 2021. Dinc co-founded Inventuna Games, a blockchain games startup, in April 2021.

== Games ==
Year	Title	Developer(s)	Publisher(s)	Ref(s).
1984	Ant Attack	Sandy White, Paul Fik	Quicksilva	
1985	Gerry the Germ Goes Body Poppin'	Mev Dinc	Firebird	
1986	Prodigy	Electric Dreams Software	Electric Dreams Software / Activision	
1986	Enduro Racer	Electric Dreams Software	Electric Dreams Software / Activision	
1986	Big Trouble in Little China	Electric Dreams Software	Electric Dreams Software / Activision	
1986	Aliens: The Computer Game	Electric Dreams Software	Electric Dreams Software / Activision	
1987	Knightmare	Electric Dreams Software	Electric Dreams Software / Activision	
1987	Last Ninja 2	System 3	Activision	
1990	Hammerfist	Vivid Image	Activision	
1990	Time Machine	Vivid Image	Activision	
1991	First Samurai	Vivid Image	Image Works	
1993	Second Samurai	Vivid Image	Psygnosis	
1994	Street Racer	Vivid Image	Ubi Soft	
1998	S.C.A.R.S.	Vivid Image	Ubi Soft	
2002	Dual Blades	Vivid Image	Metro3D	
2004	Online Football Manager	Sobee Studios	MyNet	
2004	Semih Saygıner's Billiards Magic	Sobee Studios	MyNet	
2006	İstanbul Kıyamet Vakti	Sobee Studios	Sobee Studios	
2009	I Can Football	Sobee Studios	Sobee Studios	
2011	Süpercan	Sobee Studios	Sobee Studios	
2012	I Can Football 2	Sobee Studios	Sobee Studios	
2012	Süpercan 2	Sobee Studios	Sobee Studios	
TBA	Heroes Chained	Inventuna Games	Inventuna Games	

== Books ==
- Dinc, Mev (2020). Hayat Bir Oyun: Efsane oyun yazarının ilham veren yaşam ve başarı öyküsü!. Nemesis Kitap. ISBN 9786057649300.
- Dinc, Mev (2021). Life Is a Game: The Inspirational Success Story of a Legendary Game Developer!. Mevlut Dinc. ISBN 9781914078590.
