= S.C.A.R.S. (video game) =

1998 video game

- PlayStation box cover art
- Developer: Vivid Image
- Publisher: Ubi Soft
- Producers: Gérard Guillemot, Mevlut Dinc
- Programmers: Dave Cantrell, Harrison Bernardez, Paul Hope
- Composer: Gregory Heath
- Platforms: PlayStation, Nintendo 64, Microsoft Windows
- Release: PlayStation: EU: 25 September 1998; NA: 9 October 1998; Nintendo 64, Windows: NA: 3 December 1998; EU: January 1999 (N64)
- Genre: Racing
- Modes: Single-player, multiplayer

S.C.A.R.S. is a 1998 sci-fi themed futuristic racing video game developed by Vivid Image and published by Ubi Soft for PlayStation, Nintendo 64, and Microsoft Windows.

== Gameplay ==
Gameplay on Nintendo 64: the HUD displays the current and reserve weapons on the top-left corner, while the right hand side indicates the player's position

Set in year 3000, the races are "simulations" created by supercomputers, with each supercomputer having its own car based on an animal and its own unique weapon. The nine available cars are based on: lion, elephant, rhinoceros, shark, praying mantis, scorpion, cobra, cheetah, and panther. There are 10 tracks, each with hidden shortcuts. The power-up weapons range from turbos to shields and time bombs.

== Development ==
While working on the various ports of Street Racer, Vivid Image and Ubi Soft decided it would be a good idea to create a 3D racing game specifically for the next-gen consoles. Mev Dinc, who headed Vivid Image, developed a concept of cars based on wildcats and other animals, with tracks that reflected their natural habitats. Ubi Soft loved the idea, and provided some of their own graphics and sound design resources to help fill the otherwise strained team. Originally, the game was going to be called Vivid Racing. After some iterations, they instead decided on S.C.A.R.S. As development progressed, the coders struggled with balancing the high level of detail and performance with the space limitations of the tracks. Courses needed to be shortened, and as a result, many of the technical turns and obstacles were condensed, creating a much more challenging experience than they had originally planned.

The title comes from Super Computer Animal Racing Simulator.

== Reception ==
Reception

Aggregate score
Aggregator	Score		
Aggregator	N64	PC	PS
GameRankings	71%	66%	67%

Review scores
Publication	Score		
Publication	N64	PC	PS
CNET Gamecenter	8/10	N/A	8/10
Computer Gaming World	N/A	2.5/5	N/A
Electronic Gaming Monthly	6/10	N/A	6.5/10
Game Informer	7.75/10	N/A	8/10
GameRevolution	N/A	C	N/A
GameSpot	5.7/10	7.2/10	7.6/10
Hyper	83%	N/A	85%
IGN	7.9/10	7/10	6.5/10
N64 Magazine	79%	N/A	N/A
Next Generation	3/5	N/A	2/5
Nintendo Power	7.4/10	N/A	N/A
PlayStation Official Magazine – UK	N/A	N/A	8/10
PC Gamer (US)	N/A	68%	N/A

The game received above average reviews on all platforms according to the review aggregation website GameRankings. Next Generation said of the PlayStation version in its December 1998 issue, "For all its faults, S.C.A.R.S. isn't terrible, and it is one of the few PlayStation games to allow four players to race in 3D on a split screen. If you have a Multitap, this is almost a worthy purchase. Without a Multitap, it's a colorful racer, but not much else." Two issues later, however, the magazine said of the Nintendo 64 version, "One of the best of the Mario Kart clones, S.C.A.R.S. does nearly everything right, surpassing both the graphics and the control of the PlayStation version. The game is challenging and addicting without ever annoying the player to the point of frustration. It supports up to four players via split screen and is a great way to kill time with friends."

Dr. Zombie of GamePro said of the PlayStation version in its November 1998 issue, "You shouldn't pass up S.C.A.R.S [sic] as just another kiddie Mario Kart-style racer – by taking a look under this hood, you'll find a lot of fun action." (Note: GamePro gave the PlayStation version 4.5/5 for graphics, 3.5/5 for sound, and two 4/5 scores for control and fun factor.) One issue later, he said of the Nintendo 64 version, "Mario Kart fans will find S.C.A.R.S [sic] similar but with a much harder edge. The game's action is fast and furious with enough variety in its tracks and weapons to warrant replay." (Note: GamePro gave the Nintendo 64 version three 4/5 scores for graphics, control, and fun factor, and 3.5/5 for sound.) Joel Strauch called the PC version "an easy-to-pick-up game that the kids'll love and adults will tolerate. It's missing the best part of Mario Kart-esque games—the battle mode—but you can't beat the price." (Note: GamePro gave the PC version 3.5/5 for graphics, sound, control, and fun factor.)
