= Jonathan Adiri =

Israeli businessman

- יהונתן אדירי
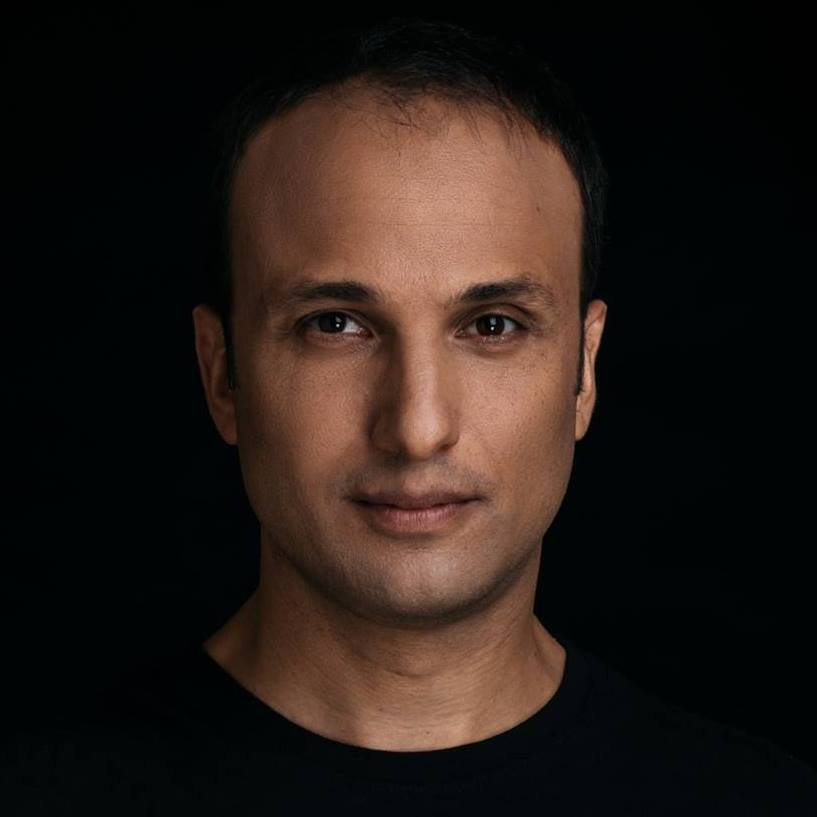

Advisor President of Israel
- In office April 2008 – January 2011
- President: Shimon Peres

Personal details
- Born: February 12, 1982 (age 44) Herzliya
- Education: Singularity University; Tel Aviv University; Open University of Israel

Jonathan Adiri (Hebrew: יהונתן אדירי; born 1982) is an Israeli digital healthcare entrepreneur and an advisor to former Israeli president Shimon Peres.

== Education ==
Jonathan Adiri studied at the Open University of Israel from the age of 14 and graduated in 2000 with a BA in Political Science and International Relations. Adiri earned his MA in Political Science and Law from Tel Aviv University. He graduated magna cum laude in 2006.

== Public service career ==
From 2005-2008, Adiri was Senior Policy Consultant for the Reut Institute, where he focused on national security. Adiri was appointed the first Chief Technology Officer for an Israeli President under President Shimon Peres, from 2008 - 2011. During his tenure, he devised a policy of technological diplomacy, forging a set of global collaborations in the water, space, agro, and biomedical fields. These collaborations helped enhance Israeli technology exports by more than $3.3 billion. While serving as Chief Technology Officer for President Peres, Adiri was a member of the inaugural class of Singularity University, where he was elected class president. Adiri is a 2012 World Economic Forum Young Global Leader. He was a panelist on the 'Rebooting Healthcare' session at the 2016 conference in Davos and on the 'Combating Rising Insecurity and Inquality' discussion at the 2017 conference.

== Business career ==
Adiri is the founder of Healthy.io, a digital healthcare start-up leveraging smartphone and cloud technology to offer access to the benefits of color-based healthcare and medical imaging. The app can help doctors diagnose patients using images from a smartphone. Healthy.io makes kits for home urine test for infections, chronic illnesses and pregnancy-related complications through a mobile app. Patients use their smartphone camera to scan a dipstick and the app uses computer vision and artificial intelligence algorithms to analyze chemical color changes. The company was identified as a World Economic Forum Technology Pioneer in 2016 and 2017 The international design firm Designit partnered with Healthy.io to host the first mobile healthcare design hackathon in January 2014.

Healthy.io won the Ciudad De Las Ideas Gift Citizen award in 2013. Adiri and Healthy.io were featured on two episodes of WIRED Magazine's docuseries 'Future Cities'; 'The innovation hubs of Tel Aviv & Ramallah' and 'The power of fantasy'. In June 2020 Healthy.io acquired the American startup inui Health, formerly known as Scanadu. In September 2020, Adiri was selected to Fortune Magazine's 40 Under 40 list.

== Published work ==
- Terror in the Court: Counter-Terrorism and Judicial Power in the Israeli Case Study, Northwestern Interdisciplinary Law Review (Vol.1, 2008)
- Counter Terror Warfare: The Judicial Front, International Institute for Counter-Terrorism, 01/07/2005
- 5 Tips for Health-Tech Entrepreneurs, VentureBeat 01/10/2016

== Awards and recognition ==
- Gifted Citizen Award, Ciudad De Las Ideas Conference 2013
- Davos World Economic Forum Young Global Leader 2012
- TIME Magazine's "The 50 Most Influential People in Health Care of 2018"
- Fortune Magazine's "40/40 in Healthcare 2020"

== See also ==
- Economy of Israel
- Digital Healthcare
