= Neuroelectrics =

Neuroelectrics is a Barcelona-based Spanish company which produces devices to stimulate and treat the brain. Founded in 2011, it is a spin-off of Starlab Neuroscience Research which was established in 2000.

The company was founded by Ana Maiques, CEO, and her husband Giulio Ruffini, both of whom had originally worked in Barcelona for the Belgian research company Starlab until it declared bankruptcy.

Neuroelectrics currently markets two medical devices:

- Enobio is a wireless and wearable brain monitoring device that record electroencephalogram (EEG).
- Starstim is a hybrid brain stimulator that combines EEG with the three types of non-invasive electric stimulation: direct current (tDCS), alternating current (tACS) and random-noise (tRNS) stimulation.

Maiques believes they could find applications in monitoring the early development of Parkinson's or Alzheimer's in order to combat worsening conditions.

In February 2014, the company opened an office in Boston, Massachusetts. In 2014, Ana Maiques won third prize in the European Commission's Women Innovator Contest for her entrepreneurial vision. In April 2015, Neuroelectrics won the Bupa Startup Stage at Wired Health 2015.

== Accreditations ==
Both Starstim and Enobio are CE certified medical devices targeted to the medical and research communities. The US Federal law classifies both Starstim and Enobio as investigational devices. Other accreditations include Health Canada Medical Device License Approval for both Starstim and Enobio. Starstim complies with the European legislation for medical devices for the treatment of pain, stroke, depression and addictive disorders.
