= Aliens: The Computer Game (UK Version) =

1986 video game

- Developers: Software Studios; Mr. Micro
- Publishers: Electric Dreams Software, Ricochet
- Producer: Jon Dean
- Designer: Mark Eyles
- Series: Alien
- Platforms: Amstrad CPC, Commodore 16, Commodore 64, ZX Spectrum
- Release: EU: December 1986
- Mode: Single-player

Aliens: The Computer Game is a 1986 video game developed by Software Studios and published by Electric Dreams Software initially for Amstrad CPC, Commodore 64 and ZX Spectrum. It is based on the film of the same title. Ports for the Commodore 16 and MSX were developed by Mr. Micro and published in 1987.

== Gameplay ==
Commodore 64 version screenshot.

Aliens: The Computer Game is played from a first-person perspective, and is set inside an atmosphere processing plant, a maze complex consisting of 255 rooms. The player encounters Alien enemies throughout the game. Upon killing an Alien, the body leaves a deadly pool of acid blood that must be avoided. The player also faces the threat of bio-mechanical growth, which, if left uncontained, results in new Alien eggs and facehugger enemies.

The player's ultimate goal is to reach the room that houses the Queen Alien and her nests, both of which must be destroyed.

The player can directly control a team of Marine soldiers, or can issue orders to the team from the Mobile Tactical Operations Bay (MTOB). When playing from the MTOB, the player has a view of the team's surroundings via video cameras attached to each soldier's helmet.

There are six playable characters from the film—Ripley, Gorman, Hicks, Bishop, Vasquez and Burke. Each character's portrait and vital signs are displayed when selected, and like the film, will flatline (and their point of view show static) if the character is killed. Each character can also tire and become sluggish if used excessively, necessitating frequent character rotation.

== Reception ==
Reception

Awards
Publication	Award
Sinclair User	SU Classic
Your Sinclair	Megagame

According to Retro Gamer, "the game was praised by the computing press - Zzap!, Amstrad Action, and Sinclair User awarded it 81%, 90% and 5/5 respectively." Crash gave it a score of 84%, with one reviewer declaring it "the best game-of-the-film to date," and the review by Zzap!64 also opined it was "the best tie-in game to date, and a good game to boot." Computer Gamer gave this "excellent game of a superb film" an overall score of 80%. Commodore User gave it 8 out of 10 and Your Sinclair gave it 9 out of 10.

In 1993, Commodore Force ranked the game at number 59 on its list of the top 100 Commodore 64 games. In a Retro Gamer retrospective, Darren Jones opined that "despite being incredible basic to look at, Aliens dripped with atmosphere and was quite unlike any movie conversion of the time, and not just because it was so bloody good. A first-person view used in the game perfectly matched the moment in the film when the pumped-up marines start exploring the deserted base and, as the game progressed, it managed to capture all the terror and confusion of the movie in a way few other titles have managed." The magazine also declared it "the scariest 8-bit game ever made." Stephen Kleckner of GamesBeat wrote it "may lack the audio/visual punch of Activision’s Aliens game, but the gameplay is more tightly defined and is forward-thinking for its time." He also recommended a Windows fan remake of Aliens titled LV-426.

== See also ==
- List of Alien, Predator and Alien vs. Predator games
