= Walter De Brouwer =

Belgian scientist

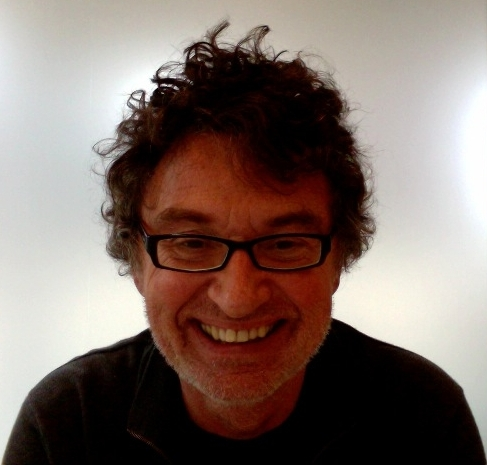
- Born: May 9, 1957 (age 69); Aalst, Belgium
- Education: Ghent University (BA Philology; MA Formal Linguistics; postgraduate Epistemology; Tilburg University (PhD Semiotics)
- Occupation: Businessman
- Known for: Personal Computer Magazine Eunet, Starlab, OLPC, Scanadu Inc, doc.ai Inc
- Spouse: Sam Lounis - De Brouwer

Walter De Brouwer (Dutch pronunciation: [ˈʋɑltər də ˈbrʌuər]; born May 9, 1957) is a Belgian-born businessman and semiotician. He is the former CEO of doc.ai and of Scanadu.

== Early life and education ==
Originally from Aalst, Belgium, De Brouwer told the Naples Daily News in 2025 that he had become an American citizen. He earned a Master's degree in linguistics from the University of Ghent and a PhD in Semiotics from Tilburg University. He was a fellow of the Centre for Entrepreneurial Learning at Judge Business School at the University of Cambridge from 2004 until 2010.

== Teaching and board memberships ==
De Brouwer was a lecturer at the University of Antwerp (UFSIA) and the University of Monaco. He is an adjunct professor at Stanford University Medical school (the Clinical Excellence Research Center).

== Career ==
=== Publisher ===
De Brouwer was the publisher of a Belgian cyberpunk magazine called Wave.

=== Internet ===
In 1996, De Brouwer was one of the founders of EUnet. Eunet was sold to Qwest Communications in 1999. He founded the employment website Jobscape.

=== Starlab ===
In 1996, along with MIT Media Lab founder Nicholas Negroponte De Brouwer founded Starlab, an interdisciplinary research center in Brussels, Belgium. Starlab went bankrupt in June 2001.

=== Scanadu ===
De Brouwer is co-founder and former CEO of Scanadu, a company founded in 2011 to develop personal health monitoring technology, now part of Healthy.io.

=== Doc.ai ===
In 2016, De Brouwer and his wife, Sam De Brouwer, founded an artificial intelligence company called doc.ai that focused on digital healthcare. The company's products included an app to help patients manage and analyze health data. In 2020, De Brouwer became the company's chief scientific officer after serving as the original CEO. After doc.ai was acquired in January 2021 by the Atlanta-based digital health company Sharecare, De Brouwer remained as chief science officer.

=== Snowcrash ===
In March 2022, de Brouwer co-founded Snowcrash, with backing from Sony Music and Universal Music Group, a platform for trading NFTs from musicians, with initial offerings from Bob Dylan and Miles Davis. De Brouwer's co-founders at Snowcrash are Jesse Dylan, a son of Bob Dylan, and Jeff Rosen.

=== SoundPatrol ===
In 2025, De Brouwer and former Disney president Michael Ovitz founded SoundPatrol, a developer of AI software which analyzes and catalogs distinctive musical elements to help identify copyright infringement; the company partnered with Universal Music Group and Sony Music in 2025 to help detect copyright violations in AI-generated music.

== Other activities ==
In 2008, De Brouwer set up OLPC Europe, the European branch of One Laptop per Child.

British publication The Independent reported in 2013 that De Brouwer had helped create over 35 companies, including two that became publicly traded through IPOs.

== Bibliography ==
- De Brouwer, Walter, The Review of English Studies, Joshua Toulmin in The Analytical Review (Oxford, 1983)
- De Brouwer, Walter; Ayris, Stephen (1985). Computer Buzz words : Teacher's guide. Wolters Leuven, ISBN 90-309-0815-7
- De Brouwer, Walter (1985). Cybercrud : computer terminology for advanced students of informatics and industrial engineering. Wolters Leuven, ISBN 90-309-0819-X
- Vanneste, Alex; Geens D, De Brouwer, Walter (1987). Het Nieuwe Landschap, Wolters Leuven, ISBN 90-309-0825-4
- De Brouwer, Walter (2004). Echelon: Three can keep a Secret, if Two of them are Dead. Delaware, ASIN B004J3UHGG
- De Brouwer, Walter (2004). The biology of language: the post-modern deconstruction and denarration of modern and pre-modern grand narratives. Universiteit van Tilburg, ISBN 978-90-810022-1-9
- De Brouwer, W., Patel, C.J., Manrai, A.K. et al. Empowering clinical research in a decentralized world. npj Digital Medicine 4, 102 (2021). Empowering clinical research in a decentralized world
