= Dual Blades =

2002 video game

- Developer: Vivid Image
- Publisher: Metro3D
- Designer: Galip Kartoğlu
- Platform: Game Boy Advance
- Release: NA: October 7, 2002; JP: December 25, 2002
- Genre: Fighting
- Modes: Single player, Multiplayer

Dual Blades is a fighting video game published by Metro3D for the Game Boy Advance. It is a fighting game with single player and player versus player modes. It features a "power combining system" which was very new for the genre at that time. This system allows players to create their own fighting style. Characters include ninjas, knights, and American adventurers, an Ottoman warrior named Efe and Nagasapa, an innocent-looking old lady who is in fact a Kazakh sorceress.

The game is also notable for being one of only nine Game Boy Advance games to be released with an M rating from the ESRB.

A sequel, Slashers: The Power Battle, made by Stun Games was released in 2013.

== Development ==
While still a student, Galip Kartoğlu had developed a PC game that he called "Slashers". With hopes of bringing it to market, he reached out to Mev Dinc at Vivid Image who was impressed with the game. Game piracy in Turkey was a serious issue, so Dinc suggested that it instead be developed for Nintendo's Game Boy Advance handheld. At the time, neither Nintendo nor Sony were issuing development licenses to Turkey, but through his connections, Dinc was able to secure the licensing and strike a deal with Metro3D for global distribution. The game's title was changed to Dual Blades, and after receiving the development kit, Galip was able to turn the game around within 6 months.

== Reception ==
Reception

Aggregate score
Aggregator	Score
Metacritic	61/100

Review scores
Publication	Score
Famitsu	21/40
GameSpot	7/10
GameSpy	2/5 stars
GameZone	8.5/10
IGN	5.5/10
Nintendo Power	3.2/5

Dual Blades received "mixed" reviews according to the review aggregation website Metacritic. In Japan, Famitsu gave it a score of one five, one four, and two sixes for a total of 21 out of 40.
