= Big Trouble in Little China (video game) =

1986 video game

- European Commodore cover art
- Publisher: Electric Dreams Software
- Designer: Mev Dinc
- Platforms: Amstrad CPC, Commodore 64, ZX Spectrum
- Release: 1986: Spectrum; 1987: Amstrad, C64
- Genre: Beat 'em up
- Mode: Single-player

Big Trouble in Little China is a side-scrolling beat 'em up designed by Mev Dinc and published by Electric Dreams Software in 1986 for the Amstrad CPC, Commodore 64, and ZX Spectrum. It is a tie-in licence for the film of the same name.

== Gameplay ==
Commodore 64 screenshot

The player controls one of the three main protagonists and may switch between them during play. The characters progresses from right to left – an unusual orientation in this genre of game – fighting oncoming enemies. Initially, the three characters fight unarmed, but each has a weapon of choice that can be collected. Jack Burton can use a gun with limited ammunition, and Wang Chi can wield swords which eventually break. The third character, Egg Shen, initially fires weak magic bolts which improve with range and strength when he finds a magic potion.

== Reception ==
Big Trouble in Little China received diverse critical reception. Your Sinclair awarded 8 out of 10, highlighting smooth scrolling and good sprite animation, only criticising the unbalanced difficulty with some enemies. In a later retrospective on tie-in licences, Your Sinclair found the animation to be poor, with little variety in enemy types, and amended their score to 52%. Conversely, Sinclair User gave only 1 star out of 5, describing the characters as poorly depicted, with no atmosphere or sound effects.

In 2011, website Hardcore Gaming 101 called all three 8-bit conversions a travesty.

=== Commodore 64 ===
The Commodore 64 version was universally panned. Zzap!64 magazine originally rated the game 34%, calling it a "poor movie tie-in and a weak addition to the beat 'em up genre". In a later issue, the score was reduced to 18%. Commodore User magazine gave the game 3/10, calling it "a dull, insipid little game", and "a pale imitation of a kung fu beat 'em up".

In 2023, website The King of Grabs reviewed the game as part of a Bad Video Games feature, and called it bland and repetitive with dreadful sound effects, and cited it as an example of a movie license that was released without the polish and detail it deserved.
