= Riddler's Den =

1985 video game

- Developer: David W. Harper
- Publisher: Electric Dreams Software
- Release: 1985

Riddler's Den is a 1985 action video game, made for the ZX Spectrum home computer. It was authored by David W. Harper as the debut title from Electric Dreams Software.

== Plot ==
The game's protagonist is Trunky the Manelephant, who has embarked on a quest to find the Great Golden God Gregogo.

== Gameplay ==
The game is half a maze and half a puzzle solver, with elements of a role-playing game (RPG). It is similar to titles such as Atic Atac. It came packaged with a poem filled with clues that the player had to decipher to progress through the game.

The player could only carry a limited number of items. A flask displayed on the top right of the screen indicated the player's energy level. If this ran out the game ended. If holding the correct object, it was possible to sleep and regain energy. This would move the timer on to the next day. The game had to be completed within a certain number of days.

== Reception ==
Sinclair User magazine asserted that the game was easy to play, but difficult to master. Your Spectrum magazine deemed the program both absorbing and frustrating due to its blending of two disparate genres: arcade and adventure.
