= Knightmare (1987 video game) =

- Developer: MD Software
- Publisher: Activision
- Programmer: Mev Dinc
- Platforms: ZX Spectrum, Amstrad CPC, Commodore 64, Atari ST
- Release: 1987
- Genre: Adventure
- Mode: Single-player

Knightmare is a video game released by Activision in 1987 for ZX Spectrum, Amstrad CPC, Commodore 64, and Atari ST. It was written by Mev Dinc, J.P. Dean, E.M. Dean and Nick Cooke, and is based on the Anglia Television show Knightmare.

Four years later, Mindscape released an entirely different game (also called Knightmare) based on the same show for the Atari ST and Amiga.

== Gameplay ==
The player is trapped in a dungeon and must attempt to escape by solving various puzzles. Casting spells is also a part of the gameplay. There are six spells: Anvil, Casper, Alchemy, Ice, Toad and Metamorph. Each has a unique result. The game is controlled by using both the joystick and keyboard. Foes include spiders and monsters.

== Reception ==
Reception

Award
Publication	Award
Sinclair User	SU Classic

Zzap!64 reviewed the Commodore 64 version of the game and said Knightmare is a pretty tough game, but is worth playing if you are an adventure game fan. It noted that the audio in the game is poor, with no music and only sound effects. The magazine rated the game 66 percent. Sinclair User magazine rated the game highly, drawing attention to the interesting subplots and the originality of the gameplay. Computer and Video Games magazine said that the gameplay in Knightmare is much simpler than the concept used in the television show. The magazine praised the puzzles and style, calling Knightmare a thoroughly enjoyable game.
