= Wicked (video game) =

1989 video game

- Amiga cover art
- Developer(s): Binary Vision
- Publisher(s): Electric Dreams Software
- Designer(s): Paul Norris; Rupert Bowater
- Programmer(s): Paul Norris
- Artist(s): Neil Strudwick
- Composer(s): Richard Joseph (Amiga, C64); Wally Beben (Atari ST)
- Platform(s): Amiga, Atari ST, Commodore 64
- Release: 1989
- Genre(s): Real-time strategy
- Mode(s): Single-player

Wicked is a real-time strategy horror-themed video game released for the Amiga, Atari ST, and Commodore 64 in 1989 by Binary Vision and Electric Dreams Software. Activision had intended to release the game for MS-DOS with EGA graphics in 1989, but the port was cancelled.

== Plot ==
The protagonist of the game is sacrificed in order to become a ring of fire to combat the evil forces of darkness that mean to plunge the earth in eternal darkness. The evil forces exist in three different points of each Zodiacal constellation.

== Gameplay ==
The game consists of using the ring of fire to keep the evil spores at bay, preventing new evil portals existing, defeating guardians so that the good spores can spread and destroy the existing evil portals before the time runs out. The difficulty of the game is determined by the night and day cycle, which has longer nights in the later levels.

== Reception ==
Reception

Review scores
Publication	Score
The Games Machine	93%(Amiga); 89% (Atari ST)
Zzap!64	92%(Amiga); 82%(C64)
Amiga Force	86%(Amiga)
CU Amiga	84% 81%
ACE	837
ST/Amiga Format	80%(Amiga); 80%(Atari ST)
The One	79%(Amiga); 77%(Atari ST)
Datormagazin	7/10
AUI	51%
