= Süpercan =

SüperCan
- Developer: Sobee Studios
- Publisher: TTÇocuk
- Director: Mev Dinc
- Designers: Yasin Demirden; Yakup Demirden; Necati Dinç
- Programmer: Yasin Demirden
- Artist: Yakup Demirden
- Composer: Alpan Aytekin
- Engine: 3D Game Studio A8
- Platform: Microsoft Windows
- Release: TUR: May, 2011
- Genre: Action-adventure
- Mode: Single-player

SüperCan is a third person action-adventure game. The game was developed by Sobee and published by TTÇocuk in May 2011. SüperCan was first announced in November 2009. SüperCan was shortlisted at the European Excellence Awards 2011 and closed in 2017.

SüperCan reached 2 million players in 8 months. Marvel Entertainment granted the right to use their superheroes in this game. A cosplay was arranged by Marvel Entertainment, Turkish Airlines and Turkish Telekom where the superheroes Spider-Man, Hulk, Iron Man, Captain America and more arrived through the airport to meet SüperCan.

== Plot ==
50 acres of forest are destroyed every minute on the Earth. While the robots are destroying the forests, the protagonist SüperCan tries to stop them. Marvel Comics' characters help him from time to time in this fight.
