= Segmental blood pressure =

- Purpose: assess and locate arterial occlusion

Segmental blood pressure is used to measure actual limb blood pressure, to assess and locate arterial occlusion.

On the legs, pressure is measured at the ankle, below the knee, above the knee, and mid-thigh. On the arm, measurements are taken at the wrist, below the elbow, above the elbow, and mid-upper arm.
