= Ana Maiques =

Spanish business executive and entrepreneur (born 1972)

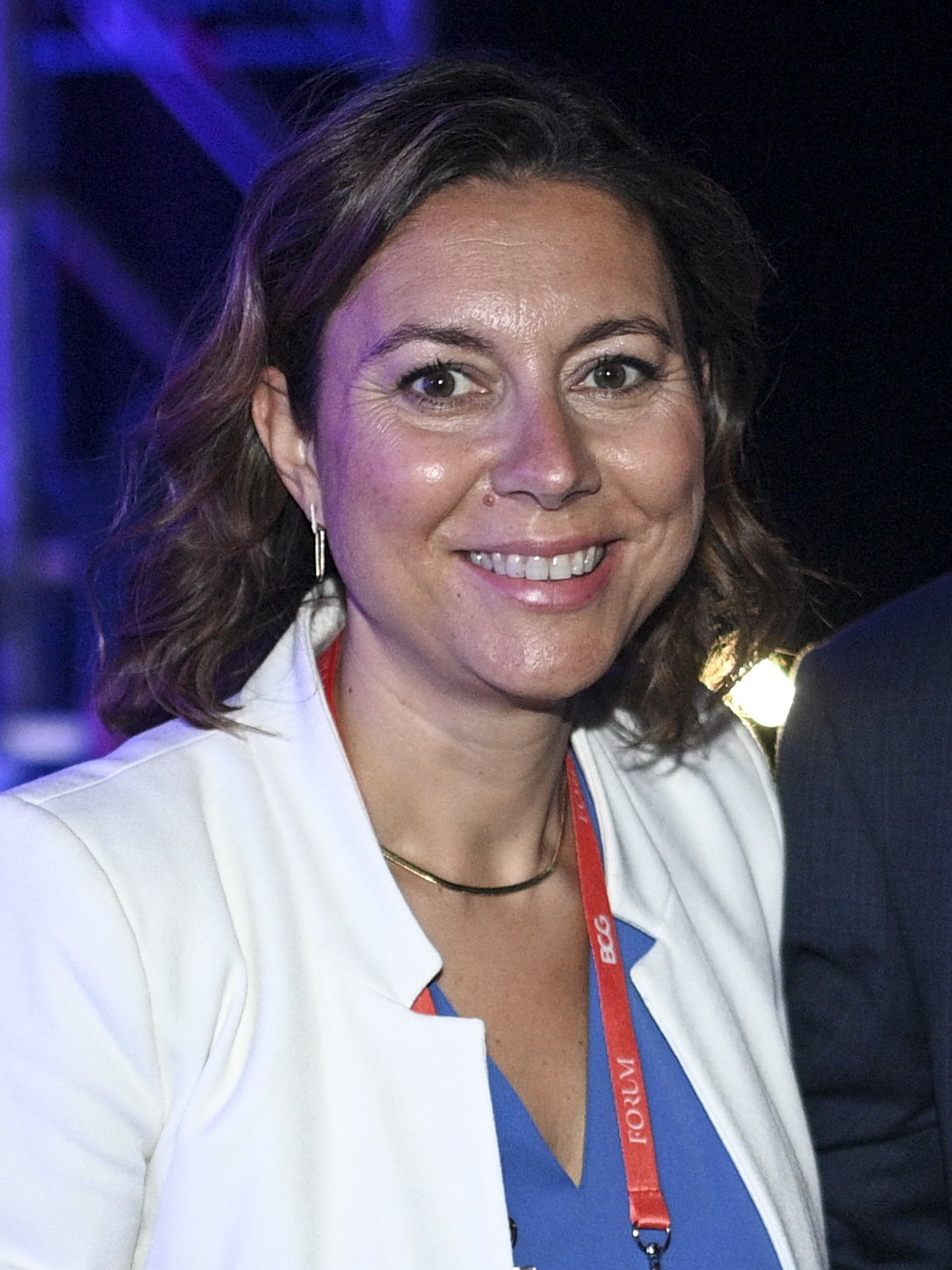
- Maiques in 2021
- Born: 1972 (age 53–54); Valencia, Spain
- Occupations: Entrepreneur, Business Executive
- Spouse: Giulio Ruffini

Ana Maiques (born 1972 in Valencia, Spain) is a Spanish entrepreneur and business executive. She is the CEO and co-founder of Neuroelectrics, a company based in Barcelona that develops non-invasive brain stimulation devices to treat neurological disorders. Maiques is also the President of EsTech, a platform for high-growth technology companies in Spain, and a member of the European Innovation Council Advisory Board. She is a prominent advocate for gender diversity in STEM fields, promoting women's representation in tech and business. Ana Maiques was named as one of the Most Inspiring Fifty Women in Europe.

== Education ==
Maiques studied economics at the University of Barcelona and has an MBA from London Metropolitan University. She has also completed IESE Business School's advanced management program.

== Business ==
=== Early career ===
Maiques began working in Barcelona for Belgian-owned company Starlab in 1999, where she worked with her husband Giulio Ruffini (they had met in Barcelona a couple of years before). In 2001, when Starlab declared bankruptcy, they took over the company's Barcelona-based research division with Manel Adell. Starlab went on to develop revolutionary technologies in the fields of space and neuroscience.

In 2014, Maiques won third prize in the European Woman Innovator of the Year awards, for her entrepreneurial vision in promoting Starlab as an innovative company of scientific excellence.

=== Neuroelectrics ===
Maiques founded Starlab spin-off Neuroelectrics in Barcelona, Spain, in 2011, and also established offices in Boston, United States in 2014. Focused on developing medical devices for the brain, Maiques describes Neuroelectrics as a "digital brain health company" that aims to treat brain disease in a non-invasive, personalized way through the use of technology.

The devices Neuroelectrics develops record brain activity and stimulate the brain by administering small currents, while brain models and algorithms enable treatments to be customized to the needs of individual patients. Its brain reading and electro-stimulation headgear has been used to measure brain fatigue in NASA pilots and may have applications in the treatment of epilepsy. Other areas of research include applications in neurodegenerative diseases such as Parkinson's and Alzheimer's, and in anxiety and depression.

Notably, Neuroelectrics has developed the Starstim device, a non-invasive brain stimulation technology that combines transcranial electrical stimulation (tES) and electroencephalography (EEG) to simultaneously stimulate and monitor brain activity. In 2020, during the COVID-19 pandemic, Neuroelectrics adapted Starstim for home use, receiving FDA approval for treating major depressive disorders remotely. In 2021, Maiques secured $17.5 million in funding to advance clinical trials for epilepsy and depression, further enhancing the device's capabilities and expanding its applications in telemedicine.

Under Maiques' leadership at Neuroelectrics, the company has achieved recognition as one of the Best Entrepreneurial Companies in 2016 in the United States, awarded by Entrepreneur magazine.

=== EsTech ===
Ana Maiques is a co-founder and the President of EsTech, a platform launched in March 2022 by nine leading Spanish high-growth technology companies, including Neuroelectrics, Cabify, and Glovo. EsTech aims to increase visibility and support for technology-based scale-ups in Spain, emphasizing their contributions to the economy, environment, and job market. The organization focuses on talent acquisition and training, access to financing, public education about the new economy, and public policy advocacy. Maiques believes these companies will significantly impact the Spanish economy in the coming years.

=== Additional Roles and Recognition ===
In addition to her significant role at Neuroelectrics, Ana Maiques is an active figure in the innovation scene, both in Europe and the United States. She is a permanent member of the European Innovation Council Advisory Board and became a Termeer Fellow at the Henri Termeer Foundation in 2018. Maiques' career has been acknowledged on multiple occasions, including Most Exceptional Entrepreneurs award by Goldman Sachs at the 2022 Builders and Innovators Summit and the title of Most Inspiring Women on the Inspiring Fifty list in Europe for two consecutive years in 2015 and 2016.

== Advocacy ==
Ana Maiques advocates for gender equality in STEM fields and has addressed challenges faced by female entrepreneurs in the technology industry.

== Personal life ==
Ana Maiques is married to physicist Giulio Ruffini. She has four children, and spends her time between Barcelona and Boston.

== Awards and recognition ==
- 2010: Nominated as one of the most influential entrepreneurs in Spain under 40 by the University of Navarre's IESE Business School
- 2014: EU Prize for Women Innovators
- 2014: International Women's Entrepreneurial Challenge (IWEC)
- 2015: Best Start-Up Health Award (for Neuroelectrics), Wired Health (UK)
- 2015: One of Inspiring Fifty's most inspiring European female leaders in the technology sector
- 2016: One of the Best Entrepreneurial Companies in America (for Neuroelectrics) in Entrepreneur Magazine's "Entrepreneur 360" list
- 2016: One of Inspiring Fifty's most inspiring European female leaders in the technology sector
- 2022: Most Exceptional Entrepreneurs Award by Goldman Sachs
- 2023: Disruption Award by Women's Startup Awards for women entrepreneurs who are "breaking the mold."
