= I Can Football =

2008 video game

- Developer(s): Sobee
- Publisher(s): TTNet
- Designer(s): Mev Dinc; Özgür Soner, Cem Sermen, Murat Afşar, Kürşat Karamahmutoğlu
- Platform(s): Windows
- Release: 2008-04-01 (Open beta); 2009-11-19 (Full version)
- Genre(s): Sports
- Mode(s): Multiplayer

I Can Football is a 3D multiplayer online soccer game created by the Turkish development house Sobee. The game was supported by Vestel at the beta stage. After Sobee had purchased by Türk Telekom, the game was published by TTnet in 2009. Sobee has recently reached marketing and sales agreements with both STC and Telecom Egypt for I Can Football. The game is published since 2010 in Egypt and Saudi Arabia.

== Gameplay ==
The player moves with the cursor keys. The player's character runs slower when they have the ball. While running the player may sprint with the "Shift" key, but sprinting depletes stamina very quickly. When stamina is depleted the player cannot run and will have to rest to regain stamina. There are two game modes, Pro and Normal. Running in Pro mode drains stamina but in Normal mode running doesn't drain stamina. Players also have gameplay options such as tackling, passing, shooting, freekick, etc.
