= Incredible Shrinking Sphere =

1989 video game

- Developer: Foursfield
- Publisher: Electric Dreams Software
- Designer: Anna Ufnowska
- Programmer: Colin Reed
- Artist: Steve Green
- Composer: David Lowe
- Platforms: Amiga, Amstrad CPC, Atari ST, Commodore 64, ZX Spectrum
- Release: January 1989: ST; February 1989: Amiga
- Genre: Action
- Mode: Single-player

Incredible Shrinking Sphere is a 1989 video game developed by Foursfield and published by Electric Dreams Software for Amiga, Amstrad CPC, Atari ST, Commodore 64, and ZX Spectrum

== Plot ==
On the planet Sangfalmadore, the player is recruited to the Sphere Training Corps. An earthquake has trapped the STC's Colonel Matt Ridley, leaving it up to the player to rescue him.

== Gameplay ==
The game consists of eight levels, each divided into four maze sections. The player must direct the ball to the exit of the maze. Each maze has traps and assassin enemies. Assassins can be countered with collectable shields or ammo. Traps can be tackled by shrinking or enlarging the ball.

== Development ==
Anna Ufnowska's inspiration for designing the game came from the intricate weaving of a pair of slippers. The project began in late February 1988 and took seven months to put together.

== Release ==
The game package included a contest slip offering a chance to win a Tomy Omnibot 2000 or a limited-edition Incredible Shrinking Sphere poster.

== Reception ==
Reception

Review scores
Publication	Score
Amstrad Action	82%(CPC)
Crash	84% (ZX)
ACE	923 (C64)
The Games Machine	80% (Amiga); 63% (CPC); 80% (ST); 84% (C64); 80% (ZX)
ST Format	80% (ST)
The One	80% (ST)

Award
Publication	Award
Crash	Smash

ACE magazine called Incredible Shrinking Sphere an impressive debut for Foursfield because of the realistic ball movement. The Spanish magazine Microhobby gave the game the following scores: Originality: 80% Graphics: 80% Motion: 80% Sound: 80% Difficulty: 100% Addiction: 100%
