= Street Racer (1994 video game) =

- North American SNES box art
- Developer: Vivid Image
- Publishers: Ubi Soft; Piko Interactive
- Composers: Matt Furniss (Mega Drive); Allister Brimble (SNES); Brian Marshall (PS, SAT, MS-DOS)
- Platforms: Super NES, Mega Drive, Game Boy, Sega Saturn, PlayStation, Amiga, Amiga CD32, MS-DOS
- Release: November 1994: Super NES; NA: November 1994; EU: November 1994 Mega Drive; PAL: June 29, 1995 PlayStation; NA: 24 October 1996; EU: 16 November 1996; JP: 10 January 1997 Saturn; EU: November 16, 1996; JP: 20 December 1996 Game Boy; NA: December 1996 Amiga; EU: 1997 MS-DOS; NA: 8 May 1997
- Genre: Kart racing
- Modes: Single-player, multiplayer

Street Racer is a racing video game published by Ubi Soft for various systems. It was released for the Super Nintendo Entertainment System in 1994, Sega Mega Drive in 1995, PlayStation, Sega Saturn and Game Boy in 1996, and MS-DOS and Amiga in 1997. Marketed as a "cross between Mario Kart and Street Fighter", the go-kart themed game combined racing with comedy and beat 'em up influenced violence. The game was a success on the SNES and Mega Drive and received mixed reviews across platforms.

== Gameplay ==
SNES version screenshot

Street Racer is a go-kart racing game which combines racing with violence. Characters can strike opponents with their fists and must avoid explosives littered around the track. The game's characters (including Surf Sister and Frank Instein) possess unique power-ups such as the Screaming Banshee, Batmobile, magic carpet and tri-plane.

The game features the ability to race various championships beginning with the Bronze Championship and moving on to progressively more difficult competitions. An alternative one-on-one mode is also available. The game awards points for final race positions, with bonus points given for accolades such as fastest lap. The competitor with the most points after all races wins the Championship. The game includes a "Rumble" mode in which players attempt to force opponents from an arena. The "Soccer" mode is a free-for-all football match with one goal and in which players tackle by colliding with the opponent.

As in many racing games, the AI in Street Racer adjusts itself according to the player's performance, becoming harder to beat if the player does well and easier to beat if the player makes mistakes.

One of the main selling points of the later PlayStation and Saturn versions was that they supported up to eight players on a split screen, something that would have ordinarily caused slowdown to the point of unplayability on contemporary gaming hardware.

== Development ==
While working on Second Samurai, Vivid Image was keen on kicking off a parallel project on the SNES. A number of ideas were considered, and they settled on a racing game similar to Super Mario Kart. Ideas for the game early-on focused on the inclusion of a famous Turkish folklore character, Nasreddin Hodja, and a "soccer mode". As the team grew, Vivid Image began renting out an office in Harrow. Newcomers to the team, twins Tony and Chris West, spearheaded the development and were able to use their coding skills on the 4-player mode to remove the need for Nintendo's DSP chip, saving $3 per cartridge. Ubi Soft would later agree to add these savings to the royalty payouts, and were keen to grow the scope to many other platforms. This would mark the start of a 4-year relationship with Ubi Soft.

== Reception ==
Reception

Review scores
Publication	Score
AllGame	4/5 (PS)
Electronic Gaming Monthly	7/10 (PS)
GameSpot	5.8/10 (PS)
Next Generation	4/5 (PS)
Amiga Format	45% (AMI)
CU Amiga Magazine	87% (AMI)
Sega Saturn Magazine	82% (SAT)

GamePro's Sarah Nade gave the SNES version a rave review, saying that it features gameplay similar to Super Mario Kart but is "even better." She praised the large selection of imaginative tracks, the individualized special weapons for each character, the four player "head-to-head-to-head-to-head" mode, the ability to rewatch races from any angle, the graphics, the smooth controls, and the alternate "Rumble" and "Soccer" modes. She concluded that "Ubi Soft has outdone itself with this racing winner."

Street Racer was a "top SNES game" and "highly successful" on the Mega Drive according to Amiga Format. Reviewing the Amiga version, Andy Smith of Amiga Format complained of the soccer mode: "Your car moves as if it's in treacle while everyone else seems to be on greased rails". The reviewer said the soccer mode was "bizarre and, frankly, not much fun". He called the rumble mode "even less exciting" and said of the game overall "It's not that it's a complete pig or anything, it's just that it promises so much and manages to deliver so little". Smith said the "good tracks" of the "top SNES game" version had been "sacrificed" for "decent speed" and complained that this speed ruined the cornering mechanics. He said the background graphics were attractive but the animations "jerky" and wrote: "Well done chaps, you've made a crap racing game with some nice backgrounds." He also called the music "dreadful" and sound effects "crap". CU Amiga Magazine complained that the tracks were shallow, but contended the game's appeal was in combating other characters. The reviewer noted the "pretty intense" action of the rumble mode and said the football mode did not live up to its potential but was a "pretty reasonable" distraction. The magazine said the game was simple but "demented fun" and praised its variety.

Jeff Kitts, reviewing the PlayStation version in GameSpot, called the game "mildly entertaining" and said "It's good enough for a weekend rental, but not much more." In Electronic Gaming Monthly, Todd Mowatt applauded the dramatic improvements seen in the PlayStation version, the selection of tracks, the weapons, and the eight-player feature, while Joe Rybicki argued that the tracks are "uninteresting and sometimes even tedious", and that the amusement offered by the weapons quickly wears thin. Gideon of GamePro agreed that the abundance of options and features are countered by the short and cluttered track designs and difficult-to-follow split-screen display. However, he also praised the cartoon-like graphics and responsive controls, and deemed it a solid substitute for Mario Kart on the PlayStation, though he recommended gamers rent it before deciding whether to buy. Like Todd Mowatt, Next Generation considered the PlayStation version a remarkable leap above the earlier versions, praising the abundance of options, "smooth and intuitive" controls, fluid animation, and challenging track design, and concluded that it "isn't the most technically advanced or groundbreaking title of the season but still manages to be just plain fun." Reviewing the Saturn version, GamePro's Captain Cameron praised the wide variety of moves but criticized that the split screen makes the portions of the screen too small when there are more than four players. He concluded the game is "not a bad rental, it's just not unique or funny enough to warrant a purchase." Rob Bright of Sega Saturn Magazine found "the characters a bit tacky and the characters largely derivative" but praised the game's artificial intelligence and variety of game modes. He called the graphics "very nice indeed, colourful and rich in detail" but said "racing tends to give you the impression that the road is moving while the car remains stationary." He compared the game to Mario Kart, saying "It lacks the overall accessibility of the Super NES classic and the course design isn't quite as innovative." He said "Street Racer remains very playable and challenging and is especially fun in multi-player mode". Other critics also noted that the game was inspired by Mario Kart, with Esquire calling it a "likeable clone, boasting more cartoon characters in the kind of no-holds-barred go-kart race you dream of having when you come home from the pub with your chums."

GamePro's brief review of the Game Boy version stated that "this cool little racer gives you lots of ways to race. ... The characters are cartoony, and the racing's decent."

In 1995, Total! ranked Street Racer 39th in its Top 100 SNES Games; they called the game a "superb racer."

French magazine Mega Force reported in summer 1996 that Street Racer had been among the best-selling Mega Drive games in recent months, describing it as a commercial success across multiple platforms.
