= Mermaid Madness =

1986 video game

- Developer: Soft Design
- Publisher: Electric Dreams Software
- Producer: Richard Chappells
- Programmers: David Pridmore, Richard Kay Commodore 64
- Composer: Fred Gray
- Platforms: Amstrad CPC, Commodore 64, ZX Spectrum
- Release: 1986
- Genre: Action-adventure
- Mode: Single-player

Mermaid Madness is an action-adventure game developed by Soft Design and published by Electric Dreams Software for the Amstrad CPC, Commodore 64, and ZX Spectrum in 1986.

== Gameplay ==
The player takes on the role of a 112 year old mermaid called Myrtle. Myrtle is on a quest to rescue Gordon, a deep sea diver who she has taken a romantic interest in. As Gordon has become trapped in a small cave, Myrtle must find a way to free him before his air runs out. As she travels around the sea bed Myrtle can collect and use a variety of objects. She must also avoid fish and other creatures which can sap her energy. However, energy can be replenished by picking up bottles of stout.

== Reception ==
Mermaid Madness received mostly positive reviews, including scores of 70% from Amstrad Action, 37/40 from ASM, 7/10 from Commodore User, 27/40 from Computer & Video Games, 15/20 from Computer Gamer, 66% from Crash, and 78% from Zzap!64. However, it also received some negative reviews such as 46% from Happy Computer and only one star out of five from Sinclair User.
