= Hammerfist =

1990 video game

- Developer: Vivid Image
- Publisher: Activision
- Director: Andrew Bond
- Designer: Hugh Riley
- Composers: Wally Beben (C64, ST, Amiga)
- Platforms: Amiga, Commodore 64, Atari ST, ZX Spectrum, Amstrad CPC
- Release: 1990
- Genre: Beat 'em up
- Mode: Single-player

Hammerfist is a side-scrolling beat 'em up video game developed by Vivid Image and released in 1990 for the Amiga, Atari ST, Commodore 64, Amstrad CPC and ZX Spectrum.

== Plot ==
In the year 2215 AD, the world is ruled by a corporation called Centro-Holographix ('Metro-Holographix' in some versions), which captures unwilling humans and replaces them with holographic versions that carry out its will. Two of the agents, Hammerfist and Metalisis, have malfunctioned and turned against Centro-Holographix, seeking to destroy it and liberate their original human forms. As part of the malfunction, the two holograms have been merged into a single being who can transform back and forth between their two forms at will. They initially escape from their storage pods in a laboratory at the bottom of the ocean and must fight their way out. They must then cross the ocean, battling a variety of undersea creatures as they go. Finally, Hammerfist and Metalisis reach a ruined city and penetrate the Centro-Holographix facility, confronting and eventually destroying the corporation's ruler, a being known as The Master. Hammerfist and Metalisis, separated into their original bodies, escape Centro-Holographix for good.

== Gameplay ==
Hammerfist battles an enemy robot in the first room of the game

The player controls either the male Hammerfist or the female Metalisis; as they occupy the same body, the player can transform from one to the other at any time in order to utilize their distinct skills. Hammerfist is a more powerful combatant, able to sustain more damage and fire energy bolts from his fists, while Metalisis is able to cartwheel (or 'flick-flack') over obstacles and gaps between platforms. Each room consists of a series of challenges, primarily computer screens that must be smashed and enemies which must be destroyed, before they are able to progress to the next room. Virtually all rooms require both characters to be used in order to complete them.

The game features separate health bars for Hammerfist and Metalisis, with the player being restricted to one character after the other is killed, as well as one for The Master. As the player defeats enemies and destroys computers, a variety of power-ups drop for them. If the player leaves a room without collecting all the available power-ups, their value is added to The Master's strength; when this is full, all power-ups become negative, and will harm the player character, until a sufficient number of them have been avoided. Some rooms also feature booths where both characters can recharge their health. Upon the death of both characters, the player is returned to the beginning of the game.

== Development ==
Hammerfist was the first game produced by UK developers Vivid Image, a company formed by Mev Dinc, Hugh Riley and John Twiddy. The three of them worked previously for System 3, leaving immediately upon the completion of Last Ninja 2 in 1988 in order to form their own company.

A version was developed for the Konix Multisystem, but as that console was never released, neither was the game.

== Reception ==
Reception

Awards
Publication	Award
Crash	Crash Smash
Sinclair User	SU Classic

All versions of Hammerfist received positive reviews at the time of release. A.C.E. said that the Amiga version was "graphically superb...a better beat 'em up than many of the mediocre coin-op conversions which are currently available for the Amiga." Amiga Format gave the game a score of 89%, praising its complexity and stating "Hammerfist is definitely a game to keep you busy for a very long time." Zero gave the game a score of 87 out of 100, stating "combine the tricky but challenging gameplay with some dramatic graphics and an excellect soundtrack and you're looking at a pretty nifty shoot 'em up."

The Games Machine praised the graphics of the Commodore 64 version and stated that it "deserves all the accolades it can grab", and Zzap!64 were similarly positive about this version, identifying its detailed sprites and animation as its best feature, giving the game a total score of 90%. Computer and Video Games were similarly positive about the Spectrum version, stating that the platform's monochrome graphics "[don't] harm the overall game which stands out as one of the better arcade adventures doing the rounds of late."
