= Qardio =

American health technology company

- Company type: Private
- Industry: Medical Devices
- Founded: 2012
- Founders: Marco Peluso; Rosario Iannella
- Headquarters: San Francisco CA, United States
- Number of locations: 3
- Key people: (Chief Executive Officer)
- Products: QardioArm; QardioBase; QardioBase 2; QardioCore; QardioMD
- Website: www.qardio.com

Qardio, Inc. is an American technology company that specializes in heart health monitoring products. It was founded by Marco Peluso and Rosario Iannella in early 2012.

Qardio's first product, QardioArm, is a wireless blood pressure monitor that connects with Apple's Health app; it received FDA 510(k) clearance in June 2014.

At CES 2015, Qardio announced two new products, QardioBase, a smart scale and body analyzer, and QardioMD, a medical dashboard for doctors. QardioBase became available for sale in November 2015.

Qardio launched the second generation of its smart scale, Qardio Base 2, in September 2017.

QardioCore ambulatory ECG/EKG monitor received CE marking in August 2017.

Qardio was selected as "Small Business of the Year" at the 2018 Entrepreneur Awards by Consumer Tech Association.

QardioCore ambulatory ECG/EKG monitor received FDA 510(k) clearance in February 2021.

Mike Alvarez, a former Medtronic executive, joined Qardio as CEO in 2021. The company changed its focus from consumers to professional health.

Qardio launches LIVE ECG with their QardioCore giving healthcare professionals the ability to monitor patients’ cardiac function remotely in real time.

The domain qardio.com was sold on November 2nd, 2025 on Namecheap.
