= Electric Dreams Software =

Defunct video game publisher

- Industry: Video games
- Founded: 1985
- Defunct: 1989
- Fate: Defunct
- Key people: Rod Cousens, Paul Cooper
- Products: Spindizzy (1986); Aliens: The Computer Game (1986); R-Type (1988)

Electric Dreams Software was a UK-based video game publisher established in 1985 by Activision and run by Rod Cousens and Paul Cooper formerly of Quicksilva . The company published video games for the ZX Spectrum, Commodore 64, Amstrad CPC and the Atari 8-bit computers between 1985 and 1989, becoming one of the top eight UK software houses by 1987.

In late 1986, the label was adapted by the American division to publish titles outside of England for the American market.

== Software Studios ==
The publisher's in-house video game developer was Software Studios, set up in April 1986 and run by John Dean and Dave Cummings. Software Studios also handled Activision's products marketed in countries outside the United States. The concept behind this team was to pool resources and ideas between all Electric Dreams projects, but they were also directly responsible for two film tie-in licenses, Aliens: The Computer Game (1986) and Big Trouble in Little China.

The company's initial releases were Riddler's Den and I, Of the Mask.

== List of releases ==
- Riddler's Den (1985), David Harper
- I, of the Mask (1985), Spaceman Ltd
- Back to the Future (1985), Software Images
- Winter Sports (video game) (1985), Software Images
- Zaxxon (1985); under license from Sega
- Aliens: The Computer Game (1986), Software Studios
- Big Trouble in Little China (1986), Software Studios
- Dandy (1986), The RamJam Corporation
- Explorer (1986), The RamJam Corporation
- Hijack (1986), Paradise Software
- Mermaid Madness (1986), Soft Design
- Prodigy (1986), MD Software
- Spindizzy (1986), Paul Shirley and Phil Churchyard
- Xarq (1986), The RamJam Corporation
- Aliens: US Version (1987), Mr. Micro
- Firetrack (1987), Aardvark Software
- FireTrap (1987), Source Software; under license from Data East USA
- Nihilist (1987), Shahid Ahmad
- RMS Titanic
- Starblade (1986), Bob Duncan and Gary Stark
- Star Raiders II (1987), Simon Freeman, Gary Stark and Bruce Poelman; under license from Atari
- Super Sprint (1987), Software Studios; under license from Atari
- Tempest (1987), David Pridmore; under license from Atari
- Super Hang-On (1986), Software Studios; under license from Sega
- Championship Sprint (1988), Catalyst Coders; under license from Atari
- Karnov (1988), Mr. Micro; under license from Data East USA
- R-Type (1988), Manfred Trenz and Andreas Escher; under license from Irem
- Incredible Shrinking Sphere (1989), Foursfield
- Wicked (1989)
- Millennium 2.2 (1989), Ian Bird
