= Healthy.io =

Digital health care service provider

- Type: Private
- Industry: Health technology
- Founded: 2013; 13 years ago
- Founders: Yonatan Adiri
- Headquarters: Boston, London, Tel Aviv
- Area served: US, UK, Israel
- Key people: Yonatan Adiri, CEO; Ido Omer, Chief Scientist; Ron Zohar, Chief Product Officer
- Website: healthy.io

Healthy.io is a health care company offering remote clinical testing and services enabled by smartphone technology. Launched in 2013 by founder and CEO Yonatan Adiri, the company uses smartphones to enable at-home diagnostics testing for the detection of signs of kidney disease, urinary tract infections, and pregnancy complications. Its digital wound management solution is used by medical personnel to measure and track wounds using a smartphone.

== History ==
Healthy.io developed smartphone-enabled products to aid in the early diagnosis of chronic kidney disease, urinary tract infections and prenatal care. Healthy.io’s urinalysis product became the first smartphone-based system to receive Food and Drug Administration clearance as a Class II clinical diagnostic device in 2018. As part of the FDA approval process of the test to monitor for kidney disease, clinical trials showed the technology had equivalent accuracy to a professional laboratory.

A peer-reviewed study in 2019 found the home-based urinalysis for early detection of kidney disease increased screening rates in patients with hypertension; 89% preferred testing at home. A separate 2019 peer-reviewed study of home urinalysis self-testing amongst diabetic patients determined compliance rates were 72%. Doctors in Britain used it in 2020 to monitor patients remotely during the COVID-19 pandemic.

The company had raised $95 million in funding as of June 2020. In June 2020, the company acquired Silicon Valley competitor Inui Health for $9 million.

== Products ==
Healthy.io's digital urinalysis products provide patients with at-home clinical-grade urinalysis. Users scan the urinalysis dipstick using a smartphone app. The technology then uses machine learning and computer vision techniques to correct the color - taking into account lighting conditions and other variables - to provide an analysis.

The company's urinalysis products can be used to detect kidney damage, urinary tract infections, and pregnancy complications such as elevated protein levels. In May 2021, a specially-modified version of the company's kidney health test was selected to accompany the Axiom Mission 1 to the International Space Station in early 2022, allowing astronauts in space to measure their kidney function in real time.

Its wound management product uses a smartphone app, calibration stickers, and web portal to measure and track chronic wounds over time. The app builds a 3D model of the wound for a more accurate assessment. As of 2020, the wound management product was being used by nurses in the U.S. and Britain.
