= Aliens: The Computer Game (US Version) =

1986 video game

- Developers: Activision; Mr. Micro
- Publishers: Activision (US); Electric Dreams Software (UK)
- Producer: Brad Fregger
- Composer: Russell Lieblich
- Series: Alien
- Platforms: Amstrad CPC, Apple II, Commodore 64, ZX Spectrum
- Release: Commodore 64: NA: 1986; EU: 1987; Apple II: NA: 1987; ZX Spectrum: EU: 1987
- Mode: Single-player

Aliens: The Computer Game is a 1986 video game developed and published by Activision for the Commodore 64, Apple II based on the film of the same title. As Activision's UK subsidiary Electric Dreams Software had independently released their own version of the game with the same title, the game was renamed for European release. Initially planned to be released as Aliens: The Second Part., it was finally published under the title Aliens: US Version with ports for the Amstrad CPC and ZX Spectrum produced by Mr Micro.

== Gameplay ==
Aliens is a series of six minigames strung together via graphical interactive sequences, akin to an adventure game, though the only interaction possible is advancing the dialog, displayed in speech balloons. The minigames are mostly action sequences that involve piloting a ship from Sulaco to the planet's surface, recognizing equipment, and fighting aliens.

== Reception ==
At the time of its release, the game received mixed reviews, including the scores of 85% from Commodore Format, 8/10 (averaged) from Computer and Video Games, 45% from Crash, 5/10 from Sinclair User, 9/10 from Your Sinclair, and 60% from Zzap!64. Info gave the Commodore 64 version four stars out of five: "The aliens are appropriately creepy, and each sequence is well done & plays quite differently from the others".

=== Retrospective ===
VentureBeat's Stephen Kleckner commented in a 2014 feature that "as with a lot of compilation-designed titles, Aliens falls into that trap of being a collection of mediocre experiences instead of a game with a singular focus. […] Hardcore fans who own a Commodore 64 should load this one up. Everyone else isn't missing much that a Let's Play video won't provide." On the other hand, Chris Cummins from Topless Robot wrote in 2010 that "the now-crude graphics aside, it's still arguably the best game based on any of the films in the Alien saga."

== See also ==
- List of Alien, Predator and Alien vs. Predator games
