= Scanadu =

Silicon Valley based company

- Company type: Private company
- Founded: 2011, Silicon Valley
- Headquarters: Sunnyvale, CA, USA
- Founders: Walter De Brouwer, Misha Chellam
- Employees: <50
- Website: www.scanadu.com

Scanadu was a Silicon Valley–based company developing next generation tests, devices and services ostensibly to allow users to better monitor their own health. It was founded in February 2011 by Walter De Brouwer and Misha Chellam in Silicon Valley. In mid-2011, Scanadu set up a lab at NASA Ames Research Center in Mountain View, California, to help grow the company. It relocated to Sunnyvale, California, in September 2016.

A prototype of Scanadu's first product, the Scanadu Scout, was unveiled on November 29, 2012. The Scanadu Scout was a portable electronic device for consumer use designed to measure different physiological parameters, including temperature, heart rate, blood oxygenation, respiratory rate, ECG, and diastolic/systolic blood pressure. Scanadu's goal was to make the Scanadu Scout available by March 2014 as an investigational device to those who participated in the Indiegogo crowdfunding campaign and agreed to participate in a research study, and afterwards, to general consumers by Q1 of 2015. Scanadu was seeking approval by the U.S. Food and Drug Administration (FDA) for the device before bringing it to market to ensure clinical-grade accuracy. Scanadu missed the initial shipping deadline; the devices finally began shipping in February 2015. In April 2016, Scanadu stated that the clinical trial with over 4,000 participants was ongoing, however in December 2016 they sent a message to the study subjects stating that the initial device had supported extensive data collection; and the Scout investigational device would only be supported until the end of the study, after which it would cease to function. However, as of October 2020 the devices still function.

It subsequently relaunched as inui Health, claiming "FDA clearance for its smartphone-enabled home urine testing platform." In June 2020 inui Health was acquired by the Israeli healthcare startup Healthy.io.

== Products ==
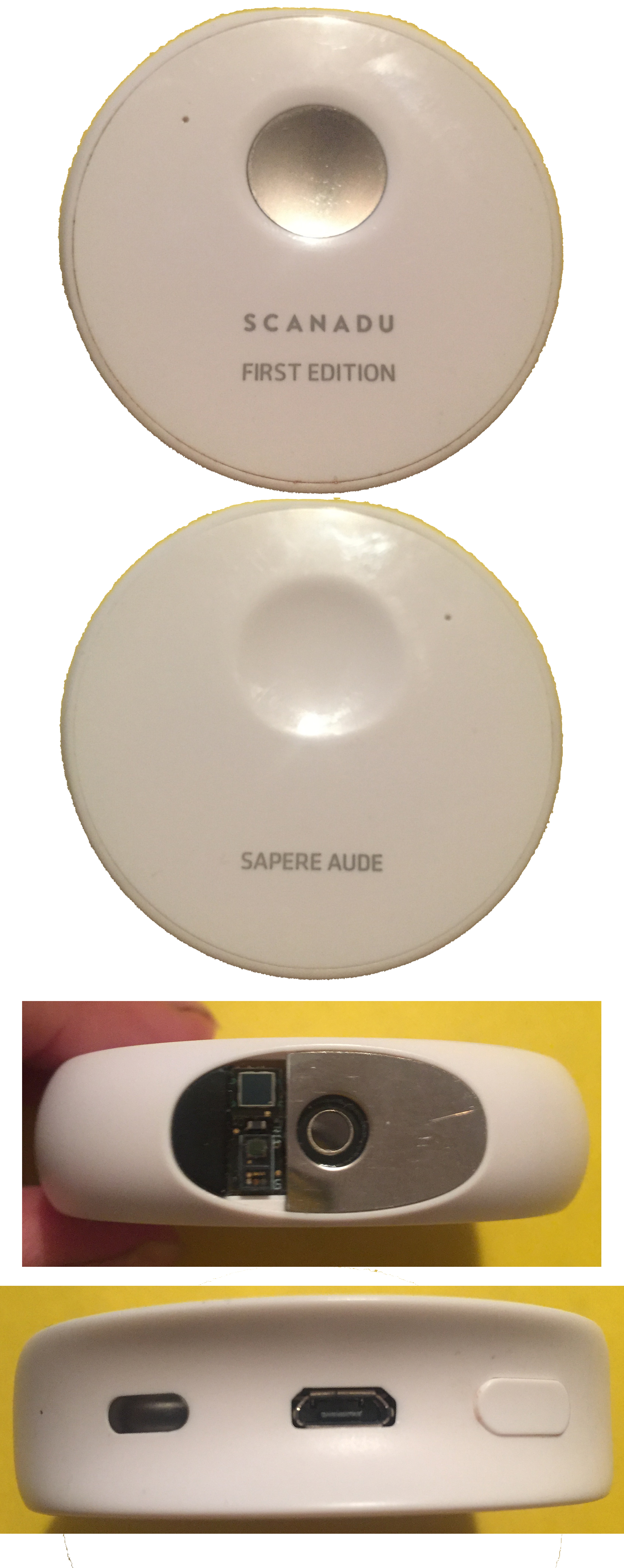
All sides of a Scanadu Scout First Edition. It is approximately 6 cm in circumference and 1.6 cm in height. This device was used in the trial until it become dysfunctional.

On November 29, 2012, the company announced a range of new tools. The Scanadu Scout is a compact device that is touched to a patient's temple and is touted as being able to produce vital sign results within 10 seconds. Project ScanaFlo is a urinanalysis test intended for screening of conditions like preeclampsia, gestational diabetes, kidney failure and urinary tract infections. Project ScanaFlu is intended for use when a patient is exhibiting cold-like symptoms. The saliva test checks for Strep A, Influenza A and B, adenovirus, and RSV. The suite of products, originally conceived of in collaboration with IDEO, was designed by industrial designer Yves Behar.

Scanadu's long-term goal is to combine a range of electrical and biochemical sensors with computational algorithms to create a Tricorder-like device. Consequently, the company is often mentioned as a contender for the $10 million Qualcomm Tricorder X Prize. Another goal is to develop a group of users who would share their medical readings, such as heart rates and stress, over many years. The aim was to personalized medicine by aggregating data about the relationships between such readings as respiration, temperature and oxygen intake before disease onset.

The idea for a product like the Scanadu Scout came to CEO Walter De Brouwer in 2003 after his five-year-old son fell about 40 feet and lapsed into a coma for 11 weeks. De Brouwer learned that none of his son's health data was being consolidated for analysis. "To someone from the tech world, this was like something from the dinosaur age," he told The New York Times.

In December 2016, Scanadu informed their customers it would no longer support its Scout device starting May 15, 2017.

== Personnel ==
Walter De Brouwer, a co-founder, stepped down from CEO in April 2016, and Jaime Tenedorio was promoted to chief executive officer.

== Funding and clinical trials ==
During summer 2013, Scanadu raised $1.66 million from 8,800 backers in more than 100 countries through Indiegogo. Of those investors, more than 20 percent were U.S.-based medical professionals such as doctors and nurses. Scanadu has since received an additional $10.5 million in Series A funding from Relay Ventures, Tony Hsieh's VegasTechFund, Jerry Yang's Ame Cloud Ventures, The Broe Group, Mindful Investors and Redmile Group.

As of November 2013, Scanadu had raised $14.7 million. The funding will support Scanadu's goals of participating in clinical trials to win FDA approval and then bringing the Scanadu Scout to market. Also in November 2013, Scanadu announced it had formed a Medical Advisory Board and would conduct its first clinical trials at the Scripps Translational Science Institute.

In April 2015, Scanadu announced it had raised $35 million in new funding and $49.7 million in total funding so far.

== Press and accolades ==
Scanadu has received press attention from a number of blogs and media outlets such as The New York Times, The Wall Street Journal, NBC's TODAY show, Popular Science, The Economist, Fast Company, Forbes, Time, TechCrunch, Wired, and the MIT Technology Review. It has also won a number of accolades including:

• CES Innovations 2014 Design and Engineering Award for Health and Fitness (honorable mention).

• 2014 Everyday Health Award for Innovation in the Healthy Consumer category.

• VentureBeat 26 Amazing Startups You Need to Watch in 2014.

• CES Best Innovation of 2013 in Personal Electronics Category.

• Company of the Year by the 14,000+ member Digital Health LinkedIn (NASDAQ: LNKD) group, beating out other notable health tech companies such as Fitbit, Withings, Qardio, Alivecor, and Proteus Digital Health, among others.

• Number Two Health Story of 2012 in Fast Company.

• Number Ten Medtech Story of 2012 in VentureBeat.
