= Second Samurai =

1993 video game

- Mega Drive cover art
- Developer: Vivid Image
- Publishers: Psygnosis; Sony Electronic Publishing (Mega Drive)
- Designer: Raffaele Cecco
- Composers: Brian Marshall (Amiga); Matt Furniss (Mega Drive)
- Platforms: Amiga, Mega Drive
- Release: EU: 1993 (Amiga); EU: November 1994 (Mega Drive)
- Genres: Action, Platform, Strategy
- Mode: Multiplayer

Second Samurai is a video game released for the Amiga in 1993. It is the sequel to the 1991 game First Samurai. A Mega Drive version was later released in 1994 which features different graphics, sound and level design to the Amiga version.

== Gameplay ==
The game includes prehistoric and futuristic levels as well as feudal Japan as in First Samurai. Contact with enemies or falling off the screen (lives are not lost automatically) subtracts one point from the life bar. In the Mega Drive/Genesis version of the game, the Demon King from the first game taunts the player on a black screen when they lose a life with sayings such as "Give up mortal!" and "Going Down!" until the last life is lost.

== Development ==
Following the success of First Samurai, Mev Dinc was interested in developing 'a sequel to end all sequels'. The concept of having two samurai to choose from was established early on. Psygnosis put forward an appealing offer for both the Amiga and Sega Mega Drive versions, to which Vivid Image gladly agreed.

Development for the game was going smoothly, and plans were even in place to release a Mega-CD version alongside the Mega Drive. In 1993 however, Sony acquired Psygnosis as part of their ramp-up for the PlayStation and mandated that existing console projects be cancelled. Vivid Image was able to negotiate a settlement, allowing the release of the Mega Drive version, and a full payout. The Mega-CD version was never released.

== Reception ==
Reception

Review scores
Publication	Score
Aktueller Software Markt	AMI: 10/12; SMD: 9/12
Amiga Action	AMI: 87%
Amiga Computing	AMI: 91%
Amiga Format	AMI: 91%
Amiga Power	AMI: 90%
Amiga User International	AMI: 85%
Computer and Video Games	AMI: 89/100
Hyper	SMD: 57/100
Mega Fun	SMD: 40%
Video Games (DE)	SMD: 58%
