= Enduro Racer =

1986 video game

- Arcade flyer
- Developer: Sega
- Publisher: Sega
- Designer: Yu Suzuki
- Composers: Hiroshi Kawaguchi; David Whittaker (C64, ST)
- Platforms: Arcade, Master System, Commodore 64, Amstrad CPC, ZX Spectrum, Atari ST, Thomson
- Release: Arcade: JP: 16 July 1986; NA: September 1986; EU: 1986; Master System: JP: May 18, 1987; NA: August 1987; EU: November 1987
- Genre: Racing
- Mode: Single-player
- Arcade system: Sega Space Harrier

Enduro Racer (エンデューロレーサー) is a 1986 racing video game developed and published by Sega for arcades. It was released in two arcade cabinet versions: a stand-up cabinet with handlebars and a full-sized dirt bike cabinet. It is often seen as a dirt racing version of Hang-On, as it uses a similar engine and PCB. The game was later released for the Master System, ZX Spectrum, Commodore 64, Amstrad CPC, Thomson computers and Atari ST in 1987.

== Gameplay ==
Arcade screenshot

Enduro Racer is a motorcycle racing game based on the sport of Enduro. The player rides a dirt bike through five stages, which have elevation changes and turns, and must avoid other riders as well as logs and boulders. Controls for the game are based on a motorcycle's handlebars, with a throttle and brake control. Players can pull up the handlebars on the cabinet to perform a wheelie. Jumping over logs is also possible, but players have to land with the wheelie technique or risk crashing. During the race, players are competing against a timer. Though the timer stops when the player has crashed, restarting is slow and consumes time.

== Development ==
Prior to the development of Enduro Racer, Sega game developer Yu Suzuki created Hang-On, his second game with the company. After deciding to make a motorcycle racing game, he had to decide on a style of racing for the game. Suzuki himself was a fan of dirt bikes, along with motocross and Enduro, but Sega's market research concluded that road-based GP 500 racing was more popular worldwide, so it was selected for use for Hang-On. Enduro Racer became Suzuki's opportunity to develop a dirt bike game.

Enduro Racer was ported to numerous systems, including the Master System, Commodore 64, ZX Spectrum, Amstrad CPC, and Atari ST; Activision handled the computer ports. The Commodore 64 port possesses four levels, with the third and fourth being more difficult versions of the first and second, while the ZX Spectrum version has five tracks and two-player multiplayer. The Japanese version of the Master System release has ten unique levels, however other territories have half the unique levels as the cartridge size was only 128 KB instead of 256 KB.

== Reception ==
Reception

Review scores
Publication	Score			
Publication	Arcade	Atari ST	C64	ZX
ACE		815/1000		
Computer and Video Games	Positive			8/10
Sinclair User				5/5
Zzap!64			16%	
Commodore User			6/10	

Award
Publication	Award
Crash	Smash

In Japan, Game Machine listed Enduro Racer on their August 15, 1986 issue as being the most-successful upright/cockpit arcade unit of the month, and it remained at the top of the charts through September and October 1986. It was Japan's second highest-grossing upright/cockpit arcade game during the latter half of 1986, just below Sega's Space Harrier. It was Japan's sixth highest-grossing upright/cockpit arcade game of 1986.

In the United Kingdom, it was the eighth highest-grossing arcade game of 1986 in London. The ZX Spectrum version of the game went to number 2 on the UK sales charts in August 1987, below BMX Simulator. Enduro Racer later topped the UK budget sales chart in June 1988.

In January 1987, Clare Edgeley reviewed the arcade game in Computer and Video Games, praising it as "brilliant" and calling it a different game from Hang-On. In 1993, the Spectrum port and was voted number 50 in the Your Sinclair Official Top 100 Games of All Time. A reviewer for Computer and Video Games praised the Spectrum port for being as close to an accurate arcade version as the Spectrum hardware can handle, with smooth graphics. John Gilbert of Sinclair User also gave high praise to the Spectrum version, stating that the conversion "puts other top software houses to shame".

Writing for Commodore User, reviewer Ferdy Hamilton was disappointed in the Commodore 64's release, citing the "blob-like sprites", jerking controls, and that the conversion could have been better than that for the ZX Spectrum, which he called "unfaultable". Three reviewers for Zzap!64 were highly critical of the Commodore 64 port, slamming the game's poor features with one reviewer stating: "It doesn't look, sound, or play anything like the original - in fact, it doesn't play at all well full stop". A reviewer for ACE wrote that the Atari ST version is a good conversion of the original but that the replacement of the bike noises with music might disappoint some.

It was re-released for the Wii's Virtual Console in North America on December 15, 2008 and in Europe on January 9, 2009.
