= Starlab =

Research institute in Belgium

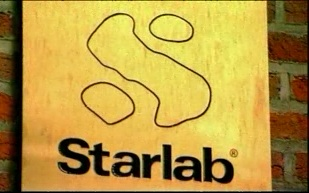

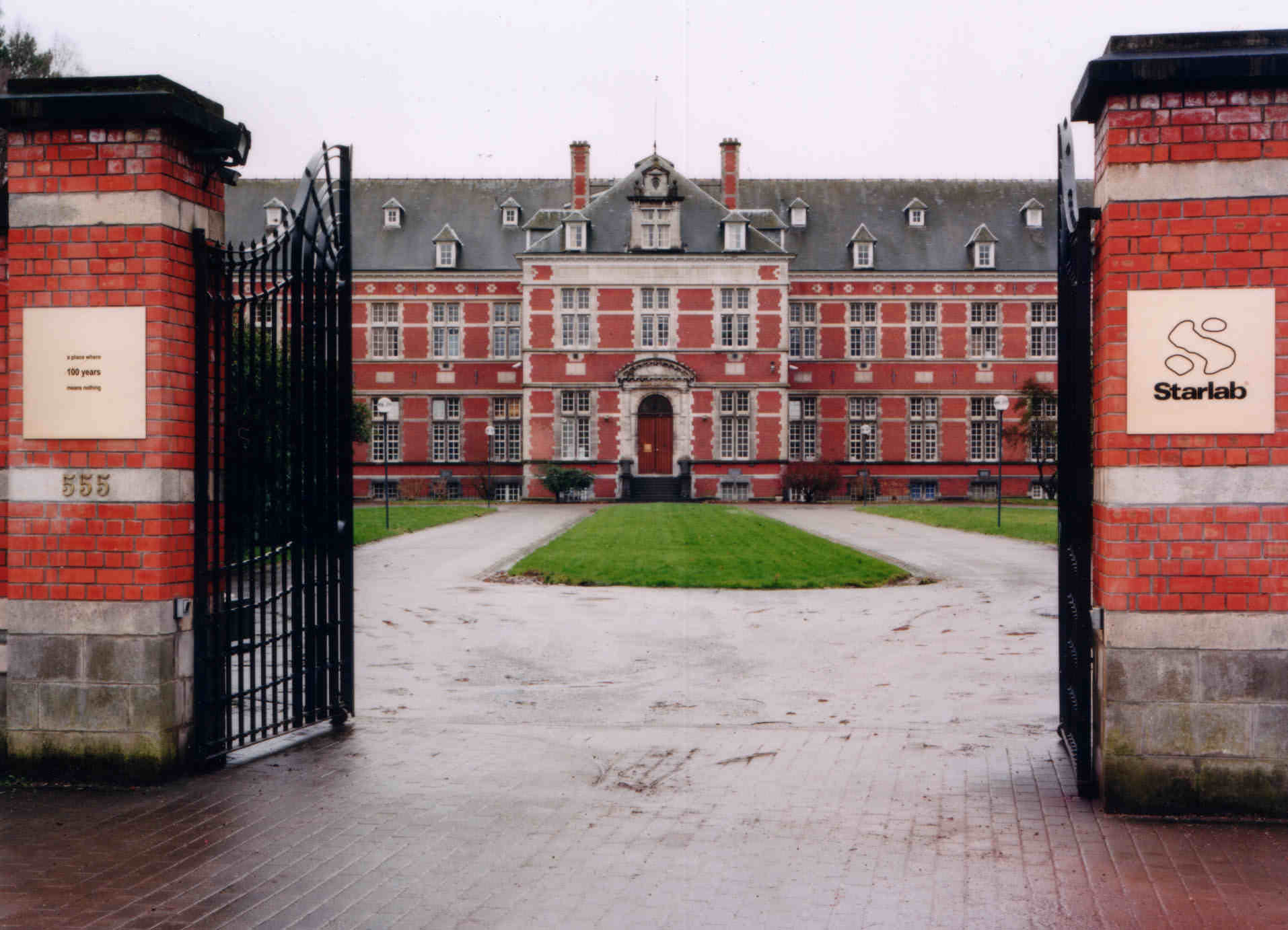
- Deep Future
- Formation: 1996; 30 years ago
- Founder: Walter de Brouwer; Nicholas Negroponte
- Headquarters: Brussels, Belgium
- Region served: International
- Affiliations: MIT; University of Oxford; Ghent University
- Staff: 130 (2001)
- Website: starlab.org

Starlab NV/SA was a multidisciplinary, blue sky research institute established to serve as an incubator for long-term and basic research in the spirit of Bell Labs, MIT Media Lab, Xerox PARC, and Interval Research. Its primary headquarters was based in Brussels, Belgium from 1996 to 2001. A second base of operations, Starlab Barcelona, was established in 2000 and remains in operation.

== Research ==
At its peak, Starlab employed over 130 scientists from thirty-six nationalities. Starlab projects included intelligent clothing, stem cell research, emotics, transarchitecture, robotics, theoretical physics, e.g., the possibility of time travel, consciousness, quantum computation, quantum information, art, artificial intelligence, neuroscience, new media, biophysics, materials science, protein folding, nanoelectronics, and wearable computing. These research lines were grouped under the acronym “BANG,” or Bits, Atoms, Neurons, Genes, later adopted by MIT Media Lab in 2002. The lab sponsored and collaborated with other labs and organized several international conferences and open research symposia.

== Members ==
Starlab's principal investors included venture capitalist Walter de Brouwer, founder and chief executive officer, MIT Media Lab founder Nicholas Negroponte, and Pythagorus investment fund manager Johan Konings. Walter Van de Velde served as chief scientific officer. Giulio Ruffini continues to serve as scientific officer for Starlab's Barcelona division. Academic and corporate partners received shared intellectual property rights to research and patents generated by the lab.

== Closure ==
Starlab's business model depended largely upon third-party investment to sustain its operations. When the dot-com bubble burst, the loss of a critical group of investors forced the lab to close its doors in 2001. The lab's assets were liquidated, and the former embassy building inhabited by the lab was purchased by the Brussels regional government.

== Starlab DF2 (Deep Future 2) Barcelona ==
The surviving research division in Barcelona, Starlab DF2, or "Deep Future 2," adopted a different business strategy, focusing on specialized, direct contracts with ESA and private clients, and public funding of the European Commission and the Catalan and Spanish Governments. Founded by Manel Adell, Giulio Ruffini, and Ana Maiques, Barcelona maintains the interdisciplinary spirit of Starlab Brussels, but focuses on neuroscience technologies and applications. The lab has been awarded the Barcelona Innovation prize and other awards.

== Spinoffs ==
Some of the intellectual property generated by Starlab research projects was purchased by investors or continued at university and research centers worldwide. Philips purchased the intellectual property rights to intelligent clothing project i-wear, which won the Avantex 2000 Innovation Prize. Bioprocessors, a biotechnology spinoff, transitioned to Silicon Valley. Pajamanation, a global marketplace for outsourcing microjobs, launched in fifty countries in 2006.

Starlab Barcelona (2000) currently focuses on applied research initiatives in neuroscience. Neuroelectrics is a spinoff from Starlab Barcelona (2011) developing brain stimulation solutions for the clinical sector. It is currently creating personalized computational brain stimulation technologies within the Neurotwin (AD) and Galvani (focal epilepsy) projects.

== Legacy ==
Starlab was featured in a Discovery Channel Special

== See also ==
- Futures Studies
- Interval Research
