= Arterial occlusion =

Blockage of blood flow through an artery

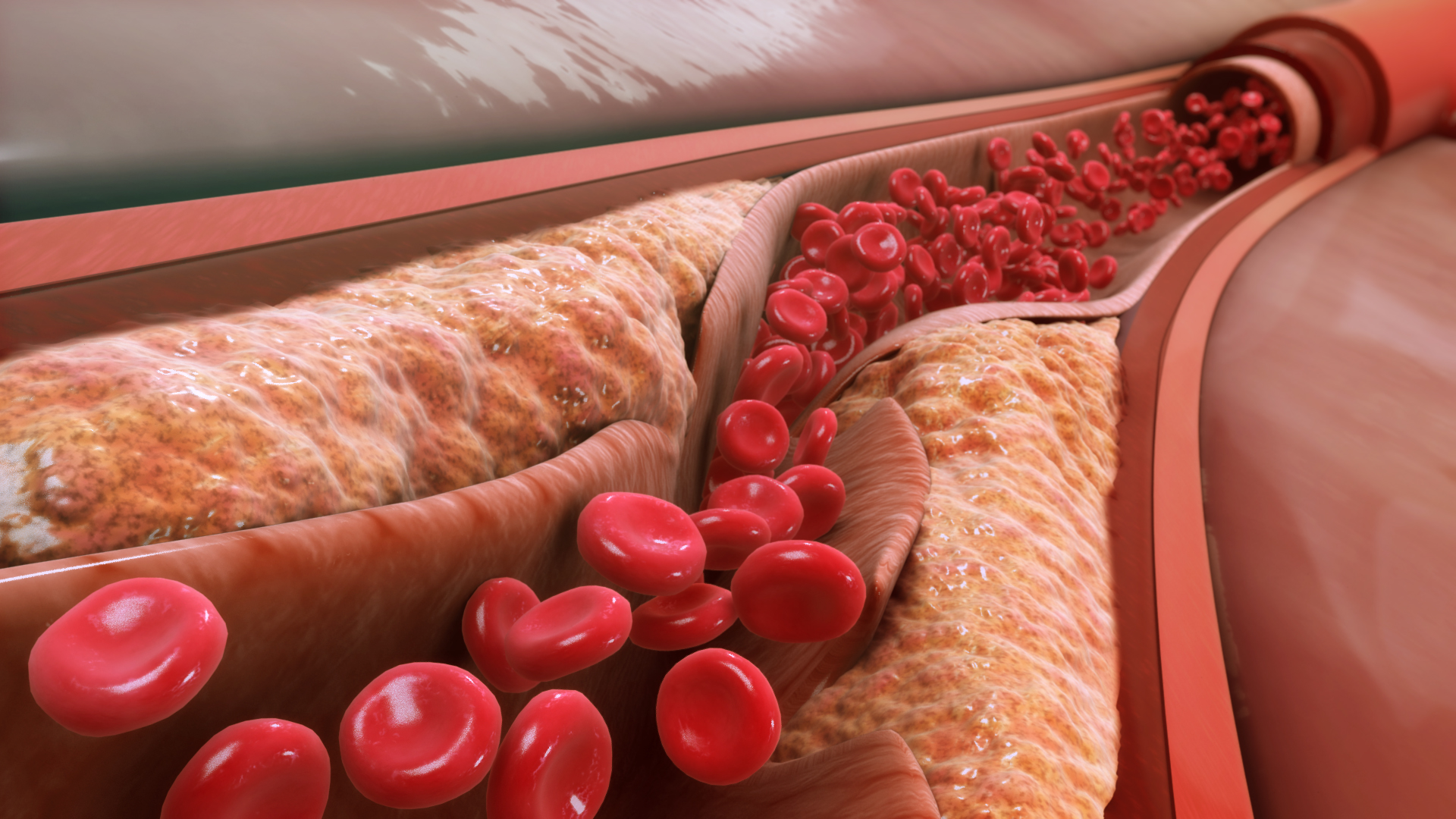
Blood flow through an artery is partially occluded by the deposition of an atherosclerotic plaque.

Arterial occlusion is a condition involving partial or complete blockage of blood flow through an artery. Arteries are blood vessels that carry oxygenated blood to body tissues. An occlusion of arteries disrupts oxygen and blood supply to tissues, leading to ischemia. Depending on the extent of ischemia, symptoms of arterial occlusion range from simple soreness and pain that can be relieved with rest, to a lack of sensation or paralysis that could require amputation.

Arterial occlusion can be classified into three types based on etiology: embolism, thrombosis, and atherosclerosis. These three types of occlusion underlie various common conditions, including coronary artery disease, peripheral artery disease, and pulmonary embolism, which may be prevented by lowering risk factors. Without proper prevention or management, these diseases can progress into life-threatening complications of myocardial infarction, gangrene, ischemic stroke, and in severe cases, terminate in brain death or cardiac arrest.

Arterial occlusion is diagnosed by exercise testing, ultrasonic duplex testing, and multi-detector coronary tomography angiography. Meanwhile, treatment can vary from surgical interventions such as bypass, endarterectomy, and embolectomy, to blood-thinning medication.

== Signs and symptoms ==
Signs and symptoms of arterial occlusion depend on several factors, including the location, extent, and onset of blockage. Normally, the blockage should affect approximately 70% of the artery for symptoms to become noticeable. Symptoms can be less severe during gradual narrowing, as this allows time for the widening of existing vessels and the formation of new ones (collateral vessels), allowing blood to still reach the area. Symptoms in this case will simply be intermittent claudication. Sudden narrowing leads to more severe consequences, given the lack of time for collateral vessels to grow. As such, coldness, numbness or even paralysis of the affected body parts may result.

The commonest symptom of arterial occlusion is intermittent claudication, which consists of a painful, aching sensation in the affected muscle. This is often provoked with physical activity and relieved with rest. Pain and muscle aching may build up with walking, and accelerate with light jogging or walking uphill. Often, pain is relieved after several minutes of rest. However, affected individuals are limited to short spurts of activity, impairing their quality of life.

For severe symptoms, the signs are usually visible and lead to ischemia. The clinical presentation of ischemia consists of the 6 Ps, including pallor, pain, paresthesia, paralysis, pulselessness, and poikilothermia. Affected individuals initially notice a paleness of the affected region and feel severe pain. As the condition worsens, the region appears bluish and numb. In extreme cases, this will give way to paralysis and poikilothermia, possibly requiring amputation of the affected limb.

== Types of arterial occlusion ==
Commonly observed types of arterial occlusion include thrombosis, atherosclerosis, and embolism.

=== Embolism ===
An embolism involves the occlusion of blood vessels by an embolus. Arterial occlusion by an embolus is termed 'arterial embolism'. An embolus is an agent that blocks blood flow by physically obstructing blood vessels. This includes gas bubbles, fatty deposits, amniotic fluid, blood clots, and foreign material. Arterial emboli occasionally detach from primary sites and travel via circulation to occlude secondary arteries, causing multiple ischemic sites.

=== Thrombosis ===
Thrombosis occurs when thrombi occlude vessels in the body. A thrombus, or a blood clot, is a mobilized mass of blood cells that circulates within the body. Thrombi can occlude veins (venous thrombosis) or arteries (arterial thrombosis). The etiology of thrombosis is described by Virchow's Triad, which includes hemostasis, vascular wall damage, and hypercoagulability. Arterial thromboses significantly narrow or completely block arterial blood flow and oxygen delivery to tissues.

=== Atherosclerosis ===
In atherosclerosis, the inner endothelial layer of arteries is stiffened by the deposition of an atheromatous plaque. Atheromatous plaques, also called atherosclerotic plaques, are made of fats and lipid-laden macrophages. Plaque deposition both physically narrows an artery and impairs the function of endothelial cells, potentiating their production of vasoconstrictive chemicals to constrict the arterial lumen. This leads to turbulent blood flow in the arteries, affecting oxygen supply to tissues downstream.

== Diseases of arterial occlusion ==
The pathophysiology of diseases of arterial occlusion depends on the type of occlusion, the severity of blockage, and the location of the occluded artery. Common diseases of arterial occlusion include Coronary Artery Disease, Peripheral Artery Disease, and Pulmonary Embolism.

=== Coronary Artery Disease ===
Coronary Artery Disease (CAD) results from the stenosis of coronary arteries by an atherosclerotic plaque. The coronary arteries perfuse the cardiomyocytes located within the myocardium. Cardiomyocytes require constant perfusion to aid the pumping of the heart. In CAD, atheromatous plaque formation in a coronary artery limits oxygen supply to cardiomyocytes, impairing heart contractility.

CAD severity varies based on the extent of coronary artery occlusion. At 75% luminal narrowing, patients experience symptoms associated with limited perfusion of cardiomyocytes, especially under strenuous conditions. Under physical exertion, CAD induces chest pain, termed 'stable angina'. Stable angina may deteriorate into unstable angina, marking the initiation of Acute Coronary Syndrome, which may further deteriorate into a myocardial infarction.

Risk factors for CAD include smoking, high cholesterol, obesity, and family history of CAD. Primarily, the accumulation of cholesterol in the bloodstream from high-fat diets lead to atherosclerotic occlusion and its clinical consequences. Therefore, preventative measures for CAD mainly involve diet changes. A diet low in saturated and trans fats with an abundance of vegetables, fruits, and grains may lower the incidence of CAD.

=== Peripheral Artery Disease ===
Peripheral artery disease (PAD), or limb ischemia, affects the femoral, popliteal, or iliac arteries. PAD is caused by atherosclerotic plaques that occlude blood flow to extremities. Once blood flow is impeded, ischemic muscle cells switch from aerobic to anaerobic metabolism to cope with oxygen scarcity. Anaerobic metabolism, however, is energy-inefficient, lowering the concentration of the intracellular energy molecule, ATP, within muscles. ATP depletion leads to a leakage of calcium into muscle cells, disrupting various muscular components and eventually causing muscle fiber necrosis.

Risk factors for PAD include old age, smoking, hypertension, and high cholesterol, with smoking being the greatest contributing factor. This is because tobacco smoke contains potent chemicals that severely increase the occurrence of PAD. Thus, primary prevention of PAD is achieved with smoking cessation.

=== Pulmonary Embolism ===
Pulmonary embolism (PE) involves occlusion of a pulmonary artery by an embolus, most often a thrombus, obstructing blood flow to the lungs. Impairment of pulmonary circulation leads to severe ventilation-perfusion mismatching of the lungs, terminating in hypoxemia and respiratory failure. Most PEs are sequelae of Deep Vein Thrombosis (DVT), resulting from the breakage and propagation of a venous thrombus formed within the extremities to a pulmonary artery.

As DVT commonly precedes PE, risk factors for PE overlap with risk factors for DVT. These include a sedentary lifestyle, prior surgery, trauma, history of DVT, and hypertension. A sedentary lifestyle and lack of movement are critical modifiable risk factors for PE. Immobility reduces the rate of leg muscle contraction, enhancing thrombus formation in vessels of the calves that may propagate to the lungs. Thus, physical activity is essential in preventing PE.

== Complications ==
Diseases of arterial occlusion may progress into life-threatening conditions with improper prevention or management. Myocardial infarction, gangrene, and ischemic stroke are among the complications of severe arterial occlusion.

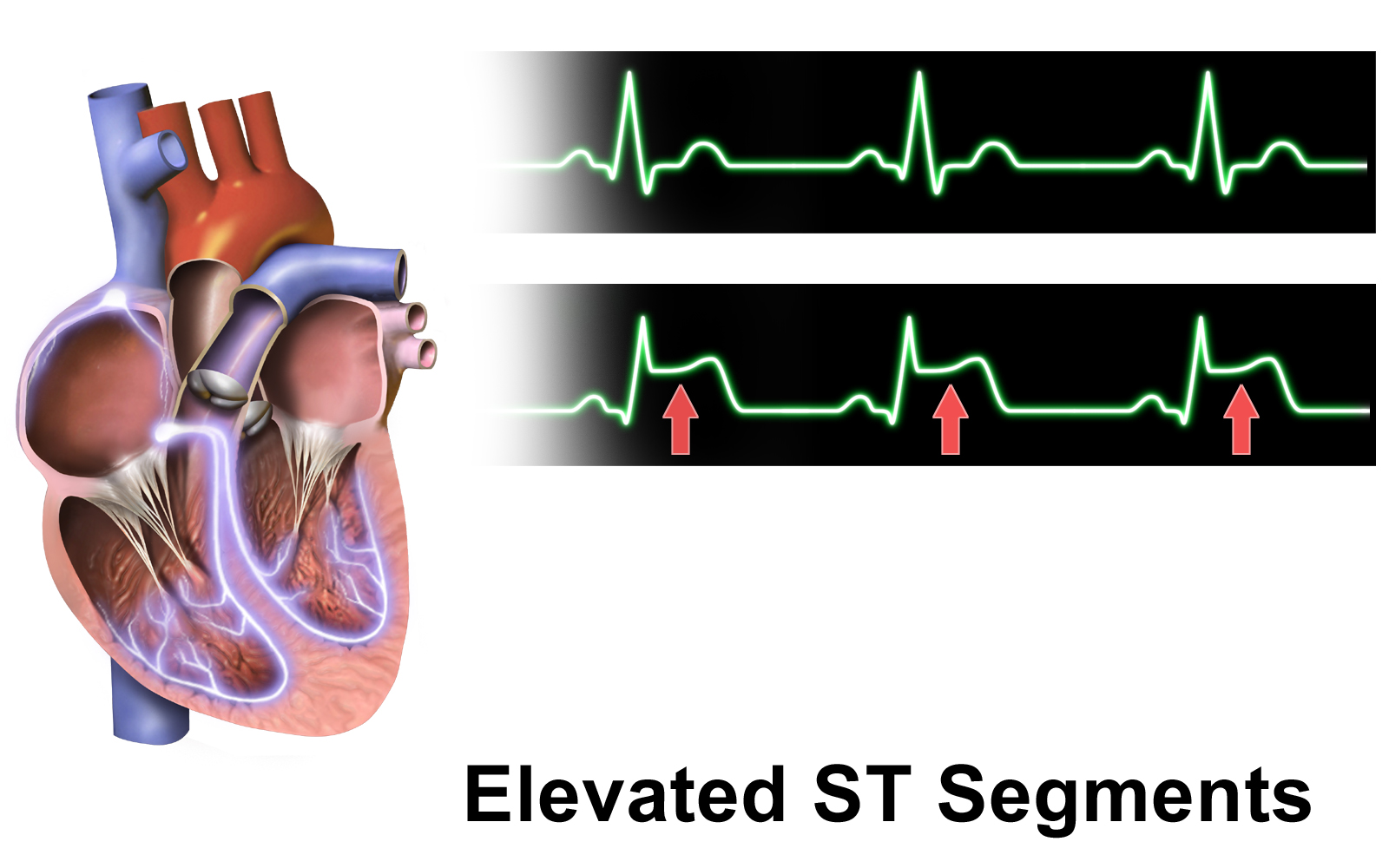
ECG traces recorded in a healthy heart (top) and in myocardial infarction (bottom). MIs cause an elevation of the ST segment on ECG traces. In MI, transmural ischemia impairs electrical potential within the heart, causing a great difference in voltage potential between uninjured and ischemic cardiomyocytes. This difference is recorded by ECG leads and is presented as ST segment elevation in ECG traces.

=== Myocardial Infarction ===
A myocardial infarction (MI), or heart attack, arises from complete occlusion of a coronary artery. The most frequent cause of MI is the rupturing of an atherosclerotic plaque formed in CAD. Plaque rupture exposes the subendothelial matrix beneath the plaque, initiating thrombus formation within the vasculature. The thrombus deposits on the ruptured plaque to completely block the coronary artery, halting oxygen supply to cardiomyocytes. Under hypoxia, cardiomyocytes perform anaerobic respiration, producing more lactate. With blocked coronary circulation, lactate clearance from cardiomyocytes is also hindered. Lactate accumulation reduces contractility and eventually necroses cardiomyocytes, releasing their troponin storage into the bloodstream. Serum troponin elevation is a characteristic biomarker of MI.

Depending on the severity of ischemia, MIs are categorized as NSTEMI or STEMI. NSTEMI stands for 'Non-ST Elevation Myocardial Infarction', referencing the lack of ST-segment elevation in ECG traces. This is because in NSTEMI, only part of the myocardial wall is infarcted, which does not diagnostically present with ST-elevation.

NSTEMI becomes STEMI when the entire myocardial wall is infarcted. Diagnostically, STEMI displays prolonged ST-segment elevation in ECG traces, and is thus named 'ST-Elevation Myocardial Infarction'. Minutes after STEMI, fatal cardiac arrest could occur. STEMI is life-threatening if immediate reperfusion therapy is not initiated.

=== Gangrene ===
Gangrene, specifically dry gangrene, is caused by an atherosclerotic or thromboembolic arterial occlusion. Gangrene is a complication of prolonged PAD, leading to shriveling, blackening, and infarction of peripheral tissue, commonly in the extremities. In severe cases, amputation of the affected limb is required.

=== Ischemic Stroke ===
Ischemic stroke is a thrombotic, or rarely, thromboembolic or atherosclerotic complication of arteries supplying the brain. Occlusion of brain arteries leads to rapid ischemic death of neurons, both at the infarct core and ischemic penumbra. Similar to cardiomyocytes, neurons require constant perfusion for proper function. Any interruption of blood supply causes neurons to switch to anaerobic metabolism, exhausting intracellular ATP levels. ATP depletion causes an influx of calcium cations into neurons and efflux of excess glutamate, triggering the apoptosis and necroptosis of neurons.

Neuronal necrosis precipitates irreversible brain damage. Cerebral areas most susceptible to ischemic damage include the speech and motor cortices, leading to contralateral paralysis, speech, and comprehension loss. Severe or prolonged strokes may terminate in coma or brain death. Therefore, the diagnosis and treatment of ischemic stroke are time-dependent.

== Diagnosis ==
There are several methods of diagnosing arterial occlusion, ranging from straightforward setups like exercise testing, to advanced scanning equipment such as ultrasonic duplex scanning or Multi-Detector Coronary Tomography (MDCT) angiography.

=== Exercise Testing ===
Exercise testing is a simplistic, non-invasive method of diagnosing intermittent claudication. Blood pressure measurements at the suspected area can be taken before and after exercise, as some symptoms only appear during strenuous activity. Commonly, a treadmill setting at 2 mph with a 12-degree slope is utilized. Subjects are asked to walk on the treadmill for a maximum of 5 minutes or until moderate pain is felt. The time to pain or maximal walking duration is recorded and compared with baselines.

Healthy individuals maintain systolic blood pressures at a normal range. Once exercise becomes more intense, there may be a temporary fall in systolic pressure, which quickly returns to normal with rest. However, those with intermittent claudication struggle to maintain standard values of systolic pressure, while recovery back to baseline is prolonged.

=== Ultrasonic Duplex Testing ===
Ultrasonic duplex scanning was developed to primarily determine the extent of atherosclerosis in carotid arteries. Since then, its application has widened to include arteries in the limbs. The technique utilizes high-frequency sound waves for visualization of flow direction and velocity within the arteries in an area of interest. The term duplex refers to 2 modes of ultrasound scanning being conducted. The B-mode transducer allows for an image of the vessel to be obtained, providing visual cues on the extent of occlusion. Meanwhile, the doppler probe is used to acquire data on velocity and direction of blood flow.

=== Multi-Detector Coronary Tomography (MDCT) Angiography ===
Traditionally, angiography is an invasive technique which involves inserting a flexible plastic catheter into the artery of interest. A radioactive contrast dye is then injected through the catheter and viewed on an X-ray. This contrast material does not permanently discolor any organs, but simply interacts with X-rays to produce a more precise diagnosis.

Due to technological advances, clinicians have begun to use a less invasive approach called Multi-Detector Coronary Tomography (MDCT) angiography. Rather than inserting a large catheter into the artery, this technique requires a small injection of contrast dye using a standard intravenous catheter inserted into the arm, much like a regular injection. MDCT scanners then locate the contrast dye to show blockages within the arteries. MDCT angiography is more sensitive in detecting blockage and subsequent diseases such as CAD compared to invasive X-ray angiography.

== Treatment ==
Treatment for arterial occlusion varies depending on the extent of blockage. In severe cases, surgical intervention is needed to remove the blockage from the affected artery. Currently, there are 3 types of surgical approaches, including surgical bypass, endarterectomy, and embolectomy. If surgery is not required, blood-thinning medication may be prescribed.

=== Surgical Bypass ===
A surgical bypass is a procedure performed to treat CAD. This procedure involves bypassing the blocked portion of the artery by replacing it with a healthy vessel from elsewhere in the body. The surgeon attaches one end of the new vessel right before the blockage, and the other end in the area after the affected portion. This reestablishes proper blood flow toward the desired area.

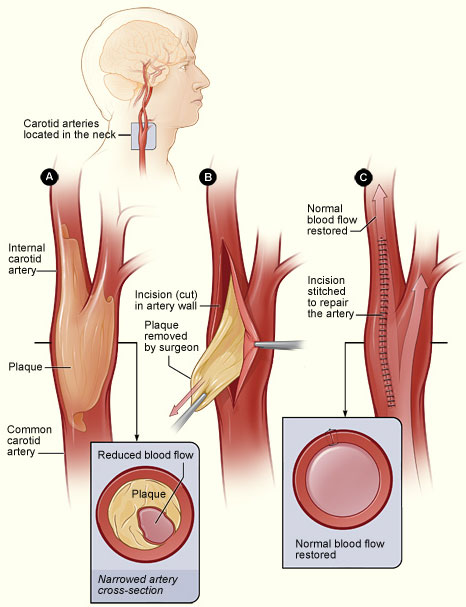
Steps of performing an endarterectomy on the carotid artery, in which the accumulated atheroma is removed via surgery.

=== Endarterectomy ===
An endarterectomy is an intervention aiming to remove accumulated plaques directly from the affected artery. This involves an incision on the side of the neck of the affected artery. The plaque is then exposed and removed accordingly, with the artery then stitched back together. With the plaque removed, blood can travel through the artery unimpeded.

=== Embolectomy ===
An embolectomy is a procedure conducted when a blockage moves from its original site to another place in the body, thus forming an embolus. There are two methods of performing embolectomy. The first method is catheter embolectomy, which involves the insertion of a catheter into the affected artery and the subsequent removal of the embolus. This option is minimally invasive, and thus lowers risk and recovery time. The other option is a traditional surgical option, where the surgeon will expose the affected region, open the blood vessel and remove the embolus.

=== Blood-thinning Medication ===
Blood-thinning medications are beneficial short-term options in managing arterial occlusion. Anticoagulants such as warfarin and antiplatelets such as aspirin and clopidogrel reduce the risk of thrombosis by making blood flow easily through arteries. Side effects include increased bleeding and heavier bruising.
