= List of Ubisoft games: 1986–1999 =

Games from 1986 to 1999 manufactured by Ubisoft

Title	Platform(s)	Release date	Developer(s)	Ref.
Zombi	Amstrad CPC	1986	Ubi Soft	
Trivial Pursuit	Thomson TO8	1986	Ubi Soft	
Asphalt	Amstrad CPC	1987	Ubi Soft	
Defender of the Crown	Atari ST	1987	Ubi Soft	
Le Maître des Âmes	Amstrad CPC	1987	Ubi Soft	
Le Maître des Âmes	DOS	1987	Ubi Soft	
Le Nécromancien	Amstrad CPC	1987	Ubi Soft	
Le Nécromancien	Atari ST	1987	Ubi Soft	
Le Nécromancien	DOS	1987	Ubi Soft	
Mange Cailloux	Amstrad CPC	1987	Ubi Soft	
ST Krak	Atari ST	1987	Ubi Soft	
Night Hunter	Atari ST	1988	Ubi Soft	
Night Hunter	DOS	1988	Ubi Soft	
B.A.T.	Atari ST	1989	Computer's Dream	
Defender of the Crown	Amstrad CPC	1989	Ubi Soft	
Final Command	Amiga	1989	Ubi Soft	
Final Command	Atari ST	1989	Ubi Soft	
Fred	Atari ST	1989	Incal Product	
Ilyad	Amiga	1989	Ubi Soft	
Intruder	Atari ST	1989	Ubi Soft	
Iron Lord	Amiga	1989	Ubi Soft	
Iron Lord	Atari ST	1989	Ubi Soft	
Iron Lord	ZX Spectrum	1989	Ashminster Computing	
Pro Tennis Tour	Amiga	1989	Blue Byte	
Pro Tennis Tour	Amstrad CPC	1989	Esprit Software Programs	
Pro Tennis Tour	Atari ST	1989	Blue Byte	
Pro Tennis Tour	Commodore 64	1989	Esprit Software Programs	
Pro Tennis Tour	DOS	1989	Blue Byte	
Pro Tennis Tour	ZX Spectrum	1989	Esprit Software Programs	
Othello Killer	Amiga	1989	Ubi Soft	
Othello Killer	Atari ST	1989	Ubi Soft	
Puffy's Saga	Amiga	1989	Butterfly Software	
Puffy's Saga	Amstrad CPC	1989	Ubi Soft	
Puffy's Saga	Atari ST	1989	Ubi Soft	
Puffy's Saga	DOS	1989	Ubi Soft	
Puffy's Saga	ZX Spectrum	1989	Ashminster Computing	
Skateball	Amstrad CPC	1989	Ubi Soft	
Skateball	Atari ST	1989	Ubi Soft	
Skateball	Commodore 64	1989	Ubi Soft	
Skateball	ZX Spectrum	1989	Ubi Soft	
TwinWorld: Land of Vision	Amiga	1989	Blue Byte	
TwinWorld: Land of Vision	Atari ST	1989	Blue Byte	
B.A.T.	Amiga	1990	Esprit Software Programs	
B.A.T.	Commodore 64	1990	Computer's Dream	
B.A.T.	DOS	1990	Computer's Dream	
Brain Blasters	Amiga	1990	Ubi Soft	
Brain Blasters	Atari ST	1990	Ubi Soft	
Fred	Amiga	1990	Incal Product	
Hexsider	DOS	1990	Ubi Soft	
Iron Lord	Acorn 32-bit	1990	Cygnus Software	
Iron Lord	Amstrad CPC	1990	Ubi Soft	
Iron Lord	Commodore 64	1990	Ordilogic Systems	
Iron Lord	DOS	1990	Ubi Soft	
Jupiter's Masterdrive	Amiga	1990	P.O.F. Corporation	
Jupiter's Masterdrive	Atari ST	1990	P.O.F. Corporation	
Night Hunter	Amiga	1990	Ubi Soft	
Night Hunter	Amstrad CPC	1990	Ubi Soft	
Night Hunter	ZX Spectrum	1990	Ubi Soft	
Pick 'n Pile	Amiga	1990	Ubi Soft	
Pick 'n Pile	Amstrad CPC	1990	Ubi Soft	
Pick 'n Pile	Apple IIGS	1990	Atreid Concept	
Pick 'n Pile	Atari 2600	1990	Ubi Soft	
Pick 'n Pile	Atari ST	1990	Ubi Soft	
Pick 'n Pile	Macintosh	1990	Atreid Concept	
Pick 'n Pile	ZX Spectrum	1990	Ubi Soft	
Pool of Radiance	Amiga	1990	Ubi Soft	
Puffy's Saga	Commodore 64	1990	Ubi Soft	
Ranx: The Video Game	Amiga	1990	Legend Software	
Ranx: The Video Game	Atari ST	1990	Ubi Soft	
Ranx: The Video Game	DOS	1990	Ubi Soft	
Tom and the Ghost	Amiga	1990	Blue Byte	
Tom and the Ghost	Atari ST	1990	Blue Byte	
Tom and the Ghost	DOS	1990	Blue Byte	
TwinWorld: Land of Vision	Acorn 32-bit	1990	Cygnus Software	
TwinWorld: Land of Vision	Amstrad CPC	1990	Blue Byte	
TwinWorld: Land of Vision	Commodore 64	1990	Blue Byte	
TwinWorld: Land of Vision	ZX Spectrum	1990	Blue Byte	
Unreal	Amiga	1990	Ordilogic Systems	
Zombi	Amiga	1990	Ubi Soft	
Zombi	Atari ST	1990	Ubi Soft	
Zombi	Commodore 64	1990	Ubi Soft	
Zombi	DOS	1990	Ubi Soft	
Zombi	ZX Spectrum	1990	Ubi Soft	
B.A.T.	Amstrad CPC	1991	Ubi Soft	
Battle Isle	Amiga	1991	Blue Byte	
Battle Isle	DOS	1991	Blue Byte	
Bomberman	Amiga	January 1992	Actionamics	
Celtic Legends	Amiga	1991	Ubi Soft	
Pro Tennis Tour 2	Amiga	1991	Blue Byte	
Pro Tennis Tour 2	Atari ST	1991	Blue Byte	
Pro Tennis Tour 2	DOS	1991	Blue Byte	
Maupiti Island	Atari ST	1991	Lankhor	
Pick 'n Pile	Apple II	1991	Ubi Soft	
Pick 'n Pile	Commodore 64	1991	Esprit Software Programs	
Pick 'n Pile	DOS	1991	Ubi Soft	
Unreal	Atari ST	1991	Art & Magic	
Unreal	DOS	1991	Art & Magic	
Bomberman	Atari ST	January 1992	Hudson Soft	
Bomberman	DOS	January 1992	Hudson Soft	
Jimmy Connors Pro Tennis Tour	Super Nintendo Entertainment System	December 1992	Blue Byte	
Hyper V-Ball	Super Nintendo Entertainment System	December 1992	Video System	
First Samurai	DOS	1992	Vivid Image	
Mega-Lo-Mania	DOS	1992	Audio Visual Magic	
Starush	Amiga	1992	Ubi Soft	
The Koshan Conspiracy	Amiga	1992	Computer's Dream	
The Koshan Conspiracy	DOS	1992	Computer's Dream	
The Perfect General	Amiga	1992	White Wolf Productions	
Vroom	Amiga	1992	Lankhor	
Jimmy Connors Tennis	Game Boy	May 1993	NMS Software	
Jimmy Connors Tennis	Atari Lynx	August 1993	NMS Software	
Jimmy Connors Tennis	Nintendo Entertainment System	November 1993	NMS Software	
Star Wars	Game Boy	June 17, 1993	NMS Software, LucasArts	
F1 Pole Position	Super Nintendo Entertainment System	December 1993	Human Entertainment	
Indiana Jones and the Last Crusade: The Action Game	Nintendo Entertainment System	December 1993	NMS Software	
Championship Manager	Amiga	1993	Domark Software	
Championship Manager	Atari ST	1993	Domark Software	
F1 Pole Position	Game Boy	1993	Natsu System	
The Koshan Conspiracy	Atari ST	1993	Computer's Dream	
Star Wars: The Empire Strikes Back	Game Boy	1993	Sculptured Software, LucasArts	
Indiana Jones and the Last Crusade: The Action Game	Game Boy	July 1994	NMS Software	
Street Racer	Super Nintendo Entertainment System	November 1994	Vivid Image	
F1 Pole Position 2	Super Nintendo Entertainment System	October 1994	Human Entertainment	
Hyper V-Ball	Super Nintendo Entertainment System	1994	Video System	
Soul Blazer	Super Nintendo Entertainment System	1994	Quintet	
Rayman	PlayStation	September 7, 1995	Ubi Soft Paris	
Action Euro Soccer 96	DOS	1995	Ubi Soft Bucharest	
Action Soccer	DOS	1995	Ubi Soft Bucharest	
Kiyeko and the Lost Night	Microsoft Windows	1995	Ubi Soft Paris	
Rayman	Atari Jaguar	September 19, 1995	Ubi Soft Paris	
Rayman	DOS	December 1995	Ubi Soft Paris	
Rayman	Microsoft Windows	1995	Ubi Soft Paris	
Rayman	Sega Saturn	December 1995	Ubi Soft Paris	
Street Racer	Sega Genesis	November 1995	Vivid Image	
Payuta and the Ice God	Microsoft Windows	1996	Ubi Soft Paris	
Adventures in Music with the Recorder	Microsoft Windows	1996	Ubi Soft	
Amazing Learning Games with Rayman	DOS	1996	Ubi Soft	
Amazing Learning Games with Rayman	Microsoft Windows	1996	Ubi Soft	
Maths and English with Rayman: Volume 2	DOS	1996	Ubi Soft	
Maths and English with Rayman: Volume 2	Microsoft Windows	1996	Ubi Soft	
Maths and English with Rayman: Volume 3	DOS	1996	Ubi Soft	
Maths and English with Rayman: Volume 3	Microsoft Windows	1996	Ubi Soft	
Secrets of the Luxor	Microsoft Windows	April 4, 1996	Mojave	
The Adventures of Valdo & Marie	Microsoft Windows	1996	Ubi Soft	
F1 Pole Position 64	Nintendo 64	October 15, 1997	Human Entertainment	
Sub Culture	Microsoft Windows	November 11, 1997	Criterion Games	
Earth 2140	Microsoft Windows	1997	TopWare Interactive	
F1 Racing Simulation	Microsoft Windows	1997	Ubi Soft	
POD	Microsoft Windows	March 28, 1997	Ubi Soft	
POD: Back to Hell	Microsoft Windows	1997	Ubi Soft	
Pro Pinball: Timeshock!	Microsoft Windows	1997	Cunning Developments	
Rayman Designer	Microsoft Windows	1997	Ubi Soft Paris	
Sean Dundee's World Club Football	Microsoft Windows	1997	Ubi Soft Bucharest	
S.C.A.R.S.	PlayStation	September 25, 1998	Vivid Image	
All Star Tennis '99	PlayStation	November 20, 1998	Smart Dog	
S.C.A.R.S.	Nintendo 64	December 4, 1998	Vivid Image	
Buck Bumble	Nintendo 64	November 20, 1998	Argonaut Games	
Cob to the Rescue!	Mac OS	1998	Scène Interactive	
Football World Manager	Microsoft Windows	1998	Caffeine Studios	
Gex: Enter the Gecko	Microsoft Windows	September 30, 1998	LTI Gray Matter	
Hell-Copter	Microsoft Windows	1998	Drago Entertainment	
Hexcite: The Shapes of Victory	Game Boy Color	1998	Gu Inc., Landwarf	
Redline Racer	Microsoft Windows	March 1998	Criterion Games	
S.C.A.R.S.	Microsoft Windows	December 3, 1998	Vivid Image	
Shadow Gunner: The Robot Wars	PlayStation	1998	Vertex Multimedia	
Speed Busters: American Highways	Microsoft Windows	November 23, 1998	Ubi Soft Montreal	
The Fifth Element	Microsoft Windows	October 1998	Kalisto Entertainment	
World Football 98	Microsoft Windows	1998	Ubi Soft	
All Star Tennis '99	Nintendo 64	January 26, 1999	Smart Dog	
Star Wars: Episode I - Racer	Microsoft Windows	May 18, 1999	LucasArts	
Requiem: Avenging Angel	Microsoft Windows	May 15, 1999	Cyclone Studios	
Monaco Grand Prix Racing Simulation 2	PlayStation	June 1999	Ubi Soft	
Tonic Trouble	Nintendo 64	September 7, 1999	Ubi Soft Montreal	
Monaco Grand Prix Racing Simulation 2	Dreamcast	September 1999	Ubi Soft	
Monaco Grand Prix Racing Simulation 2	Nintendo 64	September 1999	Ubi Soft	
Wall Street Tycoon	Microsoft Windows	October 20, 1999	Lumis Studios	
Rayman 2: The Great Escape	Microsoft Windows	November 4, 1999	Ubi Soft	
Rayman 2: The Great Escape	Nintendo 64	November 8, 1999	Ubi Soft	
Rocket: Robot on Wheels	Nintendo 64	November 17, 1999	Sucker Punch Productions	
Mobil 1 Rally Championship	Microsoft Windows	November 1999	Magnetic Fields, Creative Asylum	
Tonic Trouble	Microsoft Windows	December 3, 1999	Ubi Soft Montreal	
The Longest Journey	Microsoft Windows	December 13, 1999	Funcom Oslo	
Evolution: The World of Sacred Device	Dreamcast	December 16, 1999	Sting, Gekkou	
Alex Builds His Farm	Microsoft Windows	1999	Ubi Soft Montreal	
Laura's Happy Adventures	Microsoft Windows	1999	Ubi Soft Montreal	
Monaco Grand Prix Racing Simulation 2	Microsoft Windows	1999	Ubi Soft	
Rich Diamond	Microsoft Windows	1999	Core Concepts	
Skullcaps	Microsoft Windows	1999	Creative Edge	
Seven Kingdoms II: The Fryhtan Wars	Microsoft Windows	October 1, 1999	Enlight Software	
Shadow Company: Left for Dead	Microsoft Windows	October 20, 1999	Sinister Games	
Speed Devils	Dreamcast	October 14, 1999	Ubi Soft Montreal	
Suzuki Alstare Extreme Racing	Dreamcast	April 29, 1999	Criterion Games	
Suzuki Alstare Extreme Racing	Game Boy Color	November 1999	Visual Impact	
