= Battle Isle =

Battle Isle series
- Compilation release cover art
- Genres: Turn-based strategy Turn-based tactics
- Developers: Blue Byte; Cauldron
- Publishers: Blue Byte; Ubi Soft; Accolade
- Platforms: Amiga, MS-DOS, Windows
- First release: Battle Isle; 1991
- Latest release: Battle Isle: The Andosia War; 2000

Battle Isle is a series of turn-based strategy/tactics video games developed in the 1990s by Blue Byte and released for Amiga and MS-DOS and later for Microsoft Windows. The settings are wars on a fictional planet, Chromos.

== Plot ==
The Battle Isle storyline is set on a fictional planet called Chromos, whose society is technologically slightly more advanced than that of contemporary Earth, possessing the knowledge of advanced robotics (robots), computers (AIs) and limited spaceflight (enough to set up space colonies on the moon of Chromos). The individual games represent various wars that took place on Chromos.

== Gameplay ==
The first three games are played on a hexagonal grid for a map. Players not only control the combat units (ranging from infantry and tanks to helicopters, fighters and bombers, armored trains, surface warships and submarines, stationary gun turrets), but (especially in the later games) also many support logistics units (ammo and fuel transports, scout and radar units, road and construction vehicles, and others). Units have various weapons and can gain experience (which in later games can be transferred over in a campaign). Fuel and ammo is limited, and logistics require careful attention. Players also control buildings, where units can be repaired, and sometimes, produced. Weather conditions change, affecting unit movements (for example, a sea or river can freeze, immobilizing ships but allowing light units to move through it). Fog of war is prevalent and players have to use scouting units to gain information about the battlefield. Some of those options were added in expansions or sequels.

Players have various tasks, ranging from eliminating all opponent forces to capturing specific buildings or protecting certain units or places. In some missions events from outside the battlefield can suddenly change the situation, giving players new objectives, reinforcements, allies or enemies. In some battles there are more than two sides, each with their own objectives, not all of them directly involved in hostilities - some of them can be even allied. At the same time, those allegiances can change because of some events or actions.

Battle Isle one had the screen divided into two parts, one for each player. The turns were also divided into move and attack phases. While one player moved his units, the other commanded his own troops to carry out his actions. Battle Isle 2 gave the player the entire screen, and merged move and attack phases, and introduced the 3-D display of combat. Battle Isle 3 was very similar to Battle Isle 2, with improved graphics, more units and a new storyline. Battle Isle: The Andosian War was entirely set in the 3-D environment and combined elements of real-time and turn-based strategies.

The AI is relatively weak, relying on mass frontal assaults. After a player survives the first few turns and the AI's overwhelming numbers using protected artillery and terrain advantage, the computer is usually unable to mount a proper defense.

== History ==
Battle Isle was Blue Byte's first big success in Europe. It was completed in 1991. Inspired by the Japanese game Nectaris for the PC Engine, Battle Isle spawned numerous add-ons, sequels (most notable are Battle Isle 2 from 1993 and Battle Isle 3 from 1995) and imitations. Of those among the most notable is Blue Byte's own History Line: 1914-1918 from 1993, which moves the science fictionish climate of Battle Isle into the times of First World War. Others include the open source projects of Crimson Fields and Advanced Strategic Command.

After the release of Battle Isle 2, Blue Byte decided to release a Windows version on CD'. This was one of the first games for Windows (3.11/95 and NT). The program was to be converted to Windows while the maps were to be replaced with new ones and a new storyline was to be written. The project was led by Patric Lagny who wrote the video player for Battle Isle 2 and had many of the original graphic artists from the Battle Isle 2 team. While the program was being developed, Blue Bytes Marketing Department suggested to name this product Battle Isle 3 instead of marketing it as a Data CD for Battle Isle 2 with Windows support.

Over 600,000 copies were sold. Two data disks were released for Battle Isle, and one for Battle Isle 2. Battle Isle 3 represented the most developed variant of Battle Isle 2. However, in the late 1990s, Blue Byte decided that the old model was no longer sufficient and decided to change the model of the series.

In July 1997, an entry in the Battle Isle franchise was in the works by Blue Byte for the Panasonic M2, but it never happened due to the cancellation of the system. In 1997 a new Battle Isle game was released as a 3-D tactical squad game: Incubation, similar to UFO: Enemy Unknown and, later in 2000, Battle Isle: The Andosia War which tried to bridge the gap between turn-based strategies and real-time strategies. Both titles, while mildly successful, alienated many older players who had come to expect that the Battle Isle brand would represent traditional, board game style games.

Blue Byte attempted to use the Battle Isle brand name on yet another game (and genre), this time a MMORPG DarkSpace, which for a time was known as Battle Isle V: DarkSpace, but after Blue Byte was bought by Ubisoft the DarkSpace became an independent project.

The first games were available for the Amiga and MS-DOS. Later, Microsoft Windows became the target for the games.

In 2013, Stratotainment, LLC, a mobile game company owned by Thomas Hertzler (co-founder of Blue Byte), announced the development and the reboot of Battle Isle. Battle Isle: Threshold Run was scheduled for iOS release that year. After several delays, including an unsuccessful crowdfunding campaign, the project was halted in September 2014. In 2015, Stratotainment announced a spiritual successor to Battle Isle titled Gamma Protocol. In 2016 the trademark Battle Isle was acquired by Ubisoft.

== Reception ==
Overall, the Battle Isle series has received positive feedback in reviews. In a 1992 survey of science fiction games Computer Gaming World gave the title three-plus stars out of five, writing that "it was enjoyable for the persistent gamer looking for new worlds to conquer". A 1994 survey gave the game two-plus stars out of five, stating that "there is still a blandness in the final result". The series has sold 650,000 copies worldwide.

== Games ==
- Battle Isle (1991, strategy)
- Battle Isle Data Disk I (1992, strategy)
- Battle Isle Data Disk II (1993, strategy)
  - Also known as Battle Isle '93: The Moon of Chromos.
- Battle Isle 2200 (1994, strategy)
  - European title: Battle Isle 2
- Battle Isle II Data Disk I (1994, strategy)
  - Also known as Battle Isle II: Titan's Legacy or Battle Isle II Scenery CD
- Battle Isle 2220: Shadow of the Emperor (1995, strategy)
  - European title: Battle Isle 3: Shadow of the Emperor
- Incubation: Time Is Running Out (1997, tactics)
  - European title: Incubation: Battle Isle Phase Four
- Incubation: The Wilderness Missions (tactics)
  - Expansion pack to Incubation
- Battle Isle: The Andosia War (2000, strategy)
  - German title: Battle Isle: Der Andosia-Konflikt
- Battle Isle: Threshold Run (planned 2013 reboot, project cancelled)

== Legacy ==
In 1992, History Line: 1914-1918, a World War I game with the Battle Isle '93 engine, was released by Blue Byte.

Battle Isle has inspired two free open source clones:

- Advanced Strategic Command, first released in 1998, has two modes of play: one very similar to Battle Isle and its own, with more complex management of resources. It is available for Windows and Linux.
- Crimson Fields, first released in 2001, follows the original Battle Isle game mechanics closely, except that it doesn't allow for building of new buildings. The game is available on a variety of platforms, including Linux, Windows, Mac OS X, BeOS, Dreamcast and AROS. It is also ported to a number of embedded devices: Sharp Zaurus, Nokia 770, Windows CE, Windows Mobile (Pocket PC), Palm OS 5, Android, iStation V43 and GP2X.

Both clones include a map editor and a converter that can load Battle Isle and History Line maps.

In 2013, Battle Worlds: Kronos, described as a spiritual successor to Battle Isle, was released by King Art Games following a successful Kickstarter campaign the same year.
