= Jimmy Connors Tennis =

1993 video game

- North American NES cover art
- Developers: NMS Software; Hand Made Software (Lynx)
- Publishers: Ubi Soft; Atari Corporation (Lynx)
- Composer: Mark Cooksey
- Platforms: Nintendo Entertainment System, Game Boy, Atari Lynx
- Release: NA: November 1993; EU: 1993; Lynx: NA: August 1993; EU: 1993
- Genre: Tennis
- Modes: Single-player, multiplayer

Jimmy Connors Tennis is a tennis simulation video game developed by NMS Software and published by Ubi Soft for the Nintendo Entertainment System and the Game Boy. A version for the Atari Lynx console developed by Hand Made Software was released by Atari Corporation the same year. A Sega Genesis version was planned but never released.

The game features the name and likeness of American world-number-one tennis champion Jimmy Connors. Ubisoft published Jimmy Connors Tennis two years after Connors' late-career comeback in the Men's Singles division at the 1991 US Open, where he reached the semifinals.

Jimmy Connors Tennis is the fourth game in Ubisoft's tennis series following Pro Tennis Tour (1989), Pro Tennis Tour 2 (1991), and Jimmy Connors Pro Tennis Tour (1992).

== Gameplay ==
The player can compete in an ATP World Tour at one of three difficulty levels, or just practice hitting tennis balls. Two players may play competitively. The Game Boy version of the game allows two-player competitive play over a Game Link Cable.

== Reception ==
Reception

Review scores
Publication	Score
Computer and Video Games	Lynx: 90/100
Jeuxvideo.com	12/20
Total!	62%
Video Games (DE)	74%
