= Battle Isle 2220 =

1995 video game

Battle Isle 2220 Battle Isle 3
- Box art of North American edition of the game
- Developer: Blue Byte
- Publisher: Blue Byte
- Series: Battle Isle
- Platform: Windows
- Release: EU: 1995; US: 1996
- Genre: Turn-based strategy
- Modes: Single-player, multiplayer

Battle Isle 2220: Shadow of the Emperor, known as Battle Isle 3: Shadow of the Emperor (German: Battle Isle 3: Schatten des Imperators) in Europe, is a 1995 strategy video game developed and published by Blue Byte for the Windows 95 Operating System. It is part of the Battle Isle series.

== Story ==
Set 20 years after the events of Battle Isle 2200 player plays as Caro, the leader of the Kais, in a civil conflict against the Drulls, on the planet Chromos. The Drulls are led by Ben Haris, the son of Val Haris, the protagonist of the previous game in the series. Caro's aircraft crashes on an island where, in tunnels under the island, she comes into contact with the Emperor Punt Vassius, a disembodied survivor of a long-dead imperial dynasty, who offers his support to her, including the many powerful military units entombed with him, in return for restoring the empire and doing his bidding.

== Development ==
The game was developed by the German software development company Blue Byte as a sequel to their previous Battle Isle games. The game was developed specifically to operate on the Windows '95 platform. Music for the game was made by the German Goth-Metal band Still Patient?.

== Gameplay ==
The game is a hex-based wargame. A single-player campaign of 20 missions is included. The goal of each mission typically involves the destruction of enemy forces and the capture of various objectives. Video cut-scenes originally shot in German and dubbed into English are interspersed throughout the game to progress the plot and provide information to the player. Multiplayer and single-map missions are also available.

== Reception ==
A December 1995 review written by Andrew Wright in the British magazine PC Zone was highly positive, describing the game's graphics as "gorgeous" and praising the improved game interface and cut-scenes. The PC Zone review gave the game a score of 93% and awarded it their PC Zone Classic award. An April 1996 review in PC Entertainment magazine was broadly positive about the game, praising the graphics and cut-scenes, though criticising the dubbing and occasional corrupted saves in the Windows 95 version of the game. A review in the May 1996 edition of the US PC Gamer magazine was also mixed, praising the AI and quirky ideas behind the series but criticising the steep learning curve, and giving it a score of 80% overall. The editors of the CGR computer games reviews website gave the game mixed reviews, praising the AI but criticising the FMV video scenes.

== Legacy ==
The game was re-released as part of the Battle Isle Platinum compilation in September 2000.
