= Incubation: Time Is Running Out =

1997 turn-based tactics video game

- Developer: Blue Byte
- Publisher: Blue Byte
- Series: Battle Isle
- Engine: Extreme Assault
- Platform: Windows
- Release: October 17, 1997
- Genre: Turn-based tactics
- Modes: Single-player, multiplayer

Incubation: Time Is Running Out, known in Europe as Incubation: Battle Isle Phase Four (German: Incubation: Battle Isle Phase Vier) is a turn-based tactics computer game from Blue Byte released in 1997. It is the fourth game in the Battle Isle series. In the game, the player controls a squad of soldiers in a campaign against an alien threat. An expansion pack, The Wilderness Missions, was released in 1998.

== Gameplay ==
The single-player campaign includes around 30 missions set in futuristic interiors full of aliens, as a squad of space marines battles to save the civilians and themselves. The game has some head-to-head and co-op multiplayer support via LAN and software such as Kali. There are three difficulty levels which influence parameters like monster respawn and damage rates.

Outside of missions, the main decision is which weapons and equipment to purchase to outfit the squad. A variety of weapons are available. Some low-level guns feature bayonets for mêlée combat, which form a substantial element of the game. Equipment like jetpacks, scanners, improved armor, stimulants and medical kits becomes available as the space marines accumulate experience points.

== Plot ==
Incubation is part of the Battle Isle series, though it is only loosely related to the other installments. The plot is told outside of combat, through cutscenes and the main character's voiced weary, pessimistic monologues during mission briefings.

Cpl. Braddock is a space marine going stir crazy on a space station under Capt. Rachel Rutherford. He's at risk of hearing a fellow corporal's war story for the sixth time when the call comes to deploy to the planet below. Equipment failure has exposed the colonial city of Scay-Hallwa to the planet's environment and introduced a virus among the indigenous inhabitants, Scay'Ger, who are now turning into bloodthirsty monsters.

Bratt and his squad take part in a holding action to buy time for the city to be isolated again, and rescue a noted virologist. Gen. Urelis, the planetside commander, promotes Bratt to sergeant and sets to defending the city while the virologist cures the virus. Sadly, as Rutherford briefs her troops, this is the exact opposite of what the virologist actually tried to tell Urelis. The virus (herpes simplex) is common and endemic to humans, and has no cure. Urelis shows a flair for dramatic and counterproductive maneuvers, unveils a counterattack strategy entirely too late, authorizes lethal force against fleeing civilians to maintain order, and to Bratt's grim satisfaction, is overrun and killed. As the city falls, the marines give up even the pretense of obeying Urelis and escort civilian evacuees to an airlift to safety, but Bratt and his squad are caught in a rearguard action, cut off, and stranded. Rutherford parachutes down to assist, and together they fight their way to a pick-up point. As the marines return to the station, an exhausted Bratt asks his chatty colleague for a story, rejects hearing any of the new ones, and tells him to take his time.

== Release ==
Incubation was released on October 17, 1997 as one of the first strategy titles to use fully 3D graphics, and supported hardware acceleration on the 3dfx Voodoo.

== Expansion pack ==
The game's expansion pack, The Wilderness Missions, was released on April 24, 1998. A direct sequel revolving around Sergeant Bratt's attempts to escape the planet before he and his marines are overrun, it adds a long, challenging single-player campaign, with missions that are far more difficult and open-ended than those in the base game. It also includes new weapons and enemies, extra multiplayer features, and a map editor.

== Reception ==
Reception

Review scores
Publication	Score
Computer Gaming World	3.5/5
Computer and Video Games	4/5
GameRevolution	A-
GameSpot	6.6
PC Zone	9.4/10
Online Gaming Review	8.2/10

In the United States, the game sold only 4,805 copies during 1997. Critical reception of Incubation was mostly positive. PC Gamer awarded it the title of the Best Turn-Based Strategy Game of 1997. Others felt the game made some steps in the right direction but lacked the depth and challenge needed for a great strategy game. Writing for GameSpot, Greg Kasavin noted that "most weapons at your disposal carry limited ammunition and can overheat rather quickly, forcing you to fire only when you must". Niko Nirvi of Pelit, who initially considered Incubation a botched squad-based strategy game, came to think of it as a sort of puzzle game and was very taken with it. GamePro praised the originality, storyline, interface, and many cerebral challenges. They concluded, "Best of all, the game is both challenging and fun, proving that real-time strategy isn't always best. Incubation definitely ranks as a winner."

The Wilderness Missions was also generally well-received by critics. Kasavin rated it 8/10 points, stating that it "brings back all the strong features of the original and fixes many of its shortcomings", and that it would please fans of the original who did not think it reached its full potential. He praised the more difficult missions and high-color 3D graphics. The French Backstab Magazine also rated the game 8/10.
