= Sean Dundee =

Footballer (born 1972)

Personal information
- Full name: Sean William Dundee
- Date of birth: 7 December 1972 (age 53)
- Place of birth: Durban, South Africa
- Height: 1.87 m (6 ft 2 in)
- Position: Striker

Youth career
- Bayview Durban
- 1989–1992: D'Alberton Callies

Senior career*
Years	Team	Apps	(Gls)
1992–1994	Stuttgarter Kickers	7	(0)
1994–1995	TSF Ditzingen	34	(24)
1995–1998	Karlsruher SC	85	(36)
1998–1999	Liverpool	3	(0)
1999–2003	VfB Stuttgart	77	(25)
2003–2004	Austria Wien	18	(0)
2004–2006	Karlsruher SC	52	(14)
2006–2008	Kickers Offenbach	15	(0)
2007	→ Stuttgarter Kickers (loan)	5	(1)
2008–2009	AmaZulu	4	(0)
Total		300	(100)

International career
2000	Germany B	1	(1)
- * Club domestic league appearances and goals

Sean William Dundee (born 7 December 1972) is a former professional footballer who played as a striker. Born in South Africa, Dundee represented Germany national B team once.

== Club career ==
Born in Durban, Dundee began his football career in South Africa with local teams Bayview Durban and D'Alberton Callies Durban, before moving to Germany and Stuttgarter Kickers in 1992. After spending the 1994–95 season with TSF Ditzingen he signed with Bundesliga team Karlsruher SC. Developing to become one of the ace goalscorers in the German league, he scored 16 goals in 1995–96 and 17 goals in 1996–97. He scored 61 goals in 162 Bundesliga games.

In July 1998, he joined Premier League club Liverpool for £2 million, as joint managers Gérard Houllier and Roy Evans needed an extra striker to cover for the injured Robbie Fowler, who was unavailable until the winter. However, Dundee failed to break up the partnership of Karl-Heinz Riedle and Michael Owen during the first quarter of the season, and when Fowler returned from injury his chances of first team action were looking even more remote. He only played three games in the league for Liverpool (all of them as a substitute during the final weeks of the campaign as their bid for a UEFA Cup place slipped away) and after the end of the season he returned to Germany in a £1 million move to VfB Stuttgart.

Still struggling to regain his old form, he moved to Austrian team Austria Wien in 2003. He failed to score in 18 games before returning to KSC in 2004. For the season 2006–07 he signed a two-year contract with Kickers Offenbach. Before finishing the contract he moved back to Stuttgarter Kickers in January 2007.

After leaving his German club he signed for AmaZulu in his native Durban on 17 August 2008.

== International career ==
Dundee went as far as switching nationality to Germany, but was however never used by the national team, although he did manage a solitary appearance at "B" level, scoring once against Russia.

== Off the pitch ==
Dundee endorsed Sean Dundee's World Club Football, a 1997 football video game.

On 13 November 2013, he returned to Germany to join amateur club VSV Büchig in the Kreisliga. He played there until the end of the 2015–16 season.

Dundee became an analyst/co-commentator for the Bundesliga world feed beginning with the 2017–18 season.

== Honours ==
VfB Stuttgart

- UEFA Intertoto Cup: 2000
