= Great Court =

Great Court may refer to:

- Trinity Great Court at Trinity College, Cambridge, England
- Queen Elizabeth II Great Court at the British Museum, London, England
- Great Court, University of Queensland, a heritage-listed university site at the University of Queensland, St Lucia, City of Brisbane, Queensland, Australia
- Great Court, one of the ruins of ancient Baalbek, known as Heliopolis in Greek and Roman antiquity
- Great Courts, the alternative name of Pro Tennis Tour
