= History Line: 1914–1918 =

1992 video game

- European cover art
- Developer: Blue Byte
- Publishers: EU: Blue Byte; NA: Strategic Simulations
- Platforms: Amiga, MS-DOS
- Release: 1992
- Genre: Turn-based tactics
- Modes: Single-player, single-system multiplayer

History Line: 1914–1918 (released in North America by Strategic Simulations as Great War: 1914–1918) is a turn-based tactics video game released in 1992 by the German team Blue Byte. The storyline takes the player through various battles of the First World War. It uses the software engine based on the better known Battle Isle '93.

== Plot ==
Unit information screen; this screen show the Voisin III plane.

The storyline takes the player through various battles of World War I. The player can choose to play either the French or German side. The game starts in August 1914, with Germany invading France. As during the real war, the open greenfields of the first battles, dominated by cavalry, are gradually replaced by terrain filled with trenches and bunkers; as the number of tanks, artillery and aeroplanes increases the cavalry and infantry troops become less effective. New units become available as the game progresses, such as A7V or Mark IV tanks.

The game includes a lot of information about the period: after each mission, historical facts about two months of wartime are displayed. The game was designed to be educational, starting with an animation depicting the Western Front in 1916, and a sequence showing the assassination of Archduke Franz Ferdinand of Austria, heir to the throne of the Austro-Hungarian Empire, whose assassination in Sarajevo precipitated the Austrian declaration of war against Serbia which triggered World War I. After completing each map the player receives information about the course of the war (the game is linear - it is impossible to change history). The information includes text and illustrations taken from contemporary newspapers, both on key historical events and on trivial domestic news such as sporting events. There are also some animations, such as a zeppelin on a bombing raid London Bridge.

== Gameplay ==
Screen split in two sides, each showing part of the map - the most common view in the game

The game uses a software engine very similar to the better known Battle Isle '93 game. It is played on a hexagonal grid for a map. Both players act simultaneously on a split screen, each showing a part of a larger map. The turns are also divided into move and attack (order) phases. While one player moves his units, the other commands his own troops to carry out his actions.

The objective is to capture the enemy's headquarters building (while guarding your own); the victory can also be achieved by annihilating every unit the enemy controls. The maps have various features - different terrain types, as well as depots (to repair units) and factories (to produce) as buildings. Captured building may contain 'free' units. The units gain experience, although this experience isn't carried over from mission to mission in campaign mode.

In addition to the 24 single-player campaign maps, there are 12 two-player maps.

The AI is relatively weak, relying on mass frontal assaults. After the player survives the first few turns and the AI's overwhelming numbers using protected artillery and terrain advantage, the computer is usually unable to mount a proper defense.

== Cultural influences ==
The designers specifically tried to avoid raising any controversy. Despite the setting being one of the most devastating wars known to mankind, Blue Byte, as a German company, developed History Line to meet the restrictions of the depiction of violence in computer games which exist in that country; thus even the battlescene animations avoid excessive violence. Further, the game manual declared the designers' opposition to violence and warfare, and the manual as well as the game itself tried to avoid interpretation, relying on bare facts. The setting being the First rather than the Second World War reflects this, as World War II video games were still controversial at that time.

The game was mildly successful, but although the name implied that there may be other 'history lines' and the designers speculated that they may go on to develop games set in pre-20th century conflicts, no such games were created, as Blue Byte decided to develop the more successful Battle Isle series.

== Reception ==
Computer Gaming World in 1993 stated that History Line was "both simple to play and serves as a challenging technical simulation of warfare". The magazine liked the "high quality" computer AI, and concluded that the game was "a genuinely unique product that may be dismissed by very serious wargamers, but will be welcomed by a much larger audience ... the best release yet from Blue Byte". A 1993 survey in the magazine of wargames stated that "history takes a back seat to playability". Another review in the magazine that year stated that it was "an abstract historical game", with many of the fictional maps and scenarios akin to puzzles. It concluded that as such, History Line was "a much more playable game than any historical recreation of events could hope to be".
