= Pro Tennis Tour 2 =

1991 video game

- Developer: Blue Byte Software
- Publisher: Ubi Soft
- Platforms: Amiga, Atari ST, MS-DOS
- Release: 1991
- Genre: Sports
- Modes: Single-player, multiplayer, co-op

Pro Tennis Tour 2 (published as Great Courts 2 in France and Germany, and Jimmy Connors Pro Tennis Tour in North America) is a sports video game developed by Blue Byte Software for the Amiga and published by Ubi Soft in 1991. It is the sequel to the 1989 game Pro Tennis Tour (also released as Great Courts). Pro Tennis Tour 2 was ported to MS-DOS compatible operating systems and the Atari ST. A sequel, Jimmy Connors Pro Tennis Tour (1992), was released for the Super Nintendo.

== Gameplay ==
A singles game on a clay court.

Players have three different game modes to play; "practice", "ball machine", and "tournament". "Practice" is a quick start mode, where the player can play single matches against the computer. "Ball machine" features the player returning balls from a motorized tennis serving machine. "Tournament" lets the player proceed through generated tournaments, and eventually Grand Slams. The player can also sign up to play doubles during each tournament and even compete in the Davis Cup. Players can also see statistics of match wins, tournament wins, and also prize money earned over the career.

Matches and tournaments can be played on many different surfaces. Matches can take place on grass (textured green) for a fast-paced game, clay (textured brown) which has a significantly slower pace, and asphalt (textured grey) with the fastest play speed of all of the courts. The game is controlled with a joypad and keyboard combination on all consoles. The game can be played by one or two players, either controlling a player or a team each, and can also be played co-cooperatively, with players forming a doubles pair. Each of the individual player characters have different strengths, and weaknesses, with variables such as forehand, backhand and fitness.

== Development ==
Pro Tennis Tour 2 was created by a team of five at Blue Byte Software. This team included coding by Lothar Schmitt, graphics by János Tóth, Thorsten Knop & Uwe Meier, and score by Haiko Ruttmann. Lothar Schmitt was also involved with the project. The game was released entirely in English, but the manual was also released in German, and French.

The Amiga game was published by Ubisoft in 1991 in the United Kingdom, and the United States, and was later released in France, and Germany in 1993. The game was also released in Italy by distribution company "Leader", and Spain by Spanish publisher "Dro Soft". The game was also self-published for MS-DOS in 1991.

The game would later have an unofficial sequel in Game, Net & Match! also released by Blue Byte Software in 1998 for Windows. The game's features expand on those in Pro Tennis Tour 2, and add internet play. Due to the game's differing name, and move to 3D, the game was never officially released as a sequel to the Pro Tennis Tour series. Its working title however was Great Courts 3'.

== Reception ==
Review Score

Review scores
Publication	Score
The One for ST	90% (Atari ST)
The One for Amiga Games	90% (Amiga)
Computer and Video Games	80% (Amiga)
Amiga Power	4/5 (Amiga)
Amiga Format	82% (Amiga)

Reviews for the game were almost universally positive. Amiga Power reviewed the game as 4/5 stars, claiming "possibly the most realistic sports sim to grace the Amiga, with features galore". The One for ST magazine agreed, giving the game 90%, stating the game was "simply the best tennis sim that money could buy".

The One for Amiga Games reviewed the Amiga version of Pro Tennis Tour 2 in 1991, giving it an overall score of 90%, beginning their review by expressing that it improves upon its predecessor, stating that "the original Pro Tennis Tour was a quality simulation of tennis but it had a few significant drawbacks, all of which have been rectified in this sequel. Two players can now compete at tournament level, there is a doubles option (including the unusual doubles verus single player mode), and you now have a choice of male or female players". The One praises Pro Tennis Tour 2's gameplay as "satisfying", calling its controls "much more user friendly", and furthermore states that "the quality and range of computer opponents is superb. It's changes like this that make this sequel totally different from its predecessor". The One praises the ability to edit player statistics as "an excellent additional feature" that "genuinely affects your [abilities]", and praises the graphics as having "subtle" and "mostly smooth" animation and expresses that the sound effects are "just about spot on". Despite this, The One expresses that "it's much more difficult serving down than up the screen, and more pre-match selection screens could be more aesthetically presented". The One acknowledges these criticisms as "minor" and concludes by calling Pro Tennis Tour 2 "a brilliant tennis simulation that is as close to being definitive as you are likely to get".

However, Computer and Video Games magazine wrote that "the problem with Pro Tennis Tour 2, is that underneath the flashy exterior, lies a pretty basic game", but still gave the game 80/100. Amiga Format said the game was difficult saying "it does take a lot of learning if you want to be able to play and beat the computer opposition", and scored the game 82%.

Pro Tennis Tour would be ranked number 42 in Amiga Power's list of 100 all-time best Amiga games in 1991.

The series sold 513,000 copies worldwide.
