= Might & Magic Heroes Online =

2014 video game

- Developer: Blue Byte
- Publisher: Ubisoft
- Series: Heroes of Might and Magic
- Platform: Browser
- Release: WW: September 30, 2014
- Genre: Role-playing
- Mode: Multiplayer

Might & Magic Heroes Online was a free-to-play MMORPG released in September 2014, and closed in December 2020, developed by Blue Byte. It is part of the Heroes of Might and Magic franchise.
