= For Honor =

2017 MOBA video game by Ubisoft

- Developer: Ubisoft Montreal (Note: Ported to Windows by Ubisoft Blue Byte. Additional work by Ubisoft Quebec, Ubisoft Singapore, Ubisoft Chengdu, Color4Games, Mineloader Software, Pixeland Digital Production, Redhotcg Inc, Ubisoft Shanghai, Snart Co Limited, Ubisoft Montpellier, Ubisoft Toronto, Audiokinetic Inc, Ubisoft Pune, Ubisoft Bucharest and Studio Gobo.)
- Publisher: Ubisoft
- Director: Federico Russo
- Producer: Barbara Lombardi
- Designer: Alessandro Foschi
- Programmer: Matteo Montrasio
- Artist: Christian Diaz
- Writers: Jason Vandenberghe; Ariadne MacGillivray; Philippe-Antoine Ménard; Travis Stout
- Composers: Danny Bensi; Saunder Jurriaans (Note: Additional music by Chase Deso, James Newberry and Arthur Pingey. Marching Fire expansion's soundtrack was composed by Luc St-Pierre.)
- Engine: AnvilNext 2.0
- Platforms: PlayStation 4 Windows; Xbox One; PlayStation 5 Xbox Series X/S
- Release: February 14, 2017
- Genres: Fighting, action
- Modes: Single-player, multiplayer

For Honor is an action game developed and published by Ubisoft. The game allows players to play the roles of historical forms of soldiers and warriors such as Knights, Samurai, Vikings, Wu-lin, and a 5th faction called Outlanders using a third-person perspective. The game was developed primarily by Ubisoft Montreal and released worldwide for PlayStation 4, Windows, and Xbox One in 2016.

For Honor received generally favorable reviews, with the difficult and original combat mechanics being highlighted.

== Gameplay ==
A gameplay screenshot of the game showing three players fighting

For Honor is an action fighting game set during a medieval, fantasy setting. Players can play as a character from one of the five different factions, namely the Iron Legion (Knights), the Warborn (Vikings), the Dawn Empire (Samurai), and the Wu Lin (Ancient Chinese; introduced in October 2018 with the Marching Fire expansion), in addition to the uniquely-themed Outlander faction (introduced in January 2022). Playable characters, referred to as "Heroes", are divided into four classes. The Vanguard class is described as "well-balanced" and has excellent offense and defense. The Assassin class is fast and efficient in dueling enemies, but the class deals much less damage to multiple enemies. The Heavies, also known as Tanks, are more resistant to damage and are suitable for holding capture points, though their attacks are slow. The last class, known as "Hybrid", is a combination of two of the three aforementioned types, and is capable of using uncommon skills.

All heroes are unique and have their own weapons, skills, and fighting styles. Players fight against their opponents with their class-specific melee weapons. When players perform certain actions, such as killing multiple enemies consecutively, they gain Feats, which are additional perks. These perks allow players to gain additional points and strengths, call in a barrage of arrows or a catapult attack, or heal themselves. In most missions, players are accompanied by numerous AI minions. They are significantly weaker than the player character, and do not pose much threat.

A tactical combat system, known as "Art of Battle", is initiated when the player encounters other players or player-like AI in the multiplayer or higher health AI in the campaign. Players enter a dueling mode with them wherein players aim at their opponent with their weapon. Players can then choose to rest and move their weapon(s) in one of three directions (left, right and top) which allows them to block incoming attacks and start attacks of their own from the chosen direction. By observing on-screen hints and the movements of their opponents, which reflect their respective attack position, players are able to choose the correct position to block the other players' attacks. Players also have other special abilities, which vary depending on the character they choose, such as barging into enemies with their own shoulders and performing back-stepping swipes. The strength of each attack can also be decided by players. The system aims at allowing players to "feel the weight of the weapon in [their] hand".

=== Multiplayer ===
Similar to the single-player campaign, most multiplayer modes feature feats, AI minions, and the Art of Battle system. As the competitive multiplayer modes feature a structure similar to that of shooters, the creative director of the game called For Honor a "shooter with swords". Friendly fire is also featured in the game. Players can cause damage to their own teammates by hitting them with melee attacks or feats. The multiplayer aspect also allows players to customize their characters with various armor variations, colors, materials and ornaments. There are seven game modes:

- Dominion: Dominion is a four-versus-four multiplayer mode featuring a battlefield with three capture zones, labelled A, B and C. Controlling capture zones and killing enemy minions, that primarily fight at zone B, generates Points. Two of the capture zones, usually A and C, can be captured by either team by remaining inside them for a period of time with no enemies present. Once captured they grant the team 100 temporary Points that can be lost by losing the zone to the enemy. The zones generate 1 additional permanent Point every second, remaining inside them doubles the generation rate. The third capture zone, usually B, features minions for both teams, Each giving 2 additional permanent points when killed. It is captured when at least three minions reach the opposing team's side of the zone. When either team reaches 1000 Points, the other team enters a state called 'breaking', meaning their players cannot respawn upon death unless revived by a teammate. The game ends when either all players of a breaking team die, resulting in that team's defeat, or a four minute timer, starting when a team goes breaking, expires, resulting in the victory of the team with more Points.
- Brawl: In this two-versus-two multiplayer mode, each team must eliminate the other, best out of five rounds wins.
- Duel: Duel is a one-versus-one multiplayer mode in which a player must eliminate their opponent or have more remaining health by the end of the five minute round in order to win. Best out of 5 rounds wins the match.
- Ranked Duel: Ranked duel features the same format and similar rules as regular duels. Additionally, players start in a qualifying stage called "unranked", where they will have to complete 8 matches before they are placed into one of seven rank tiers, Bronze, Silver, Gold, Platinum, Diamond, Master and Grand Master. Players placement depends on how many wins or losses they receive in the 8 qualifying matches as well as their rank in previous seasons. The player's rank resets at the end of every season. After players are placed within their respective rank tier, they will be pitted against other players within a similar rank tier. Completing a ranked Match will earn special effect rewards unique to each season, as well as a chance to earn Special add-ons ('Ornaments') for heroes released up to the Year 4 Marching Fire update.

Despite the new rewards each season, Ranked Duels have been in "beta" ever since they were released shortly after launch

- Skirmish: Skirmish is a four-versus-four multiplayer mode in which players gain points while killing enemies. Once either team earns enough points, they must eliminate the players from the other team and win the match.
- Elimination: A team of players must eliminate the entire opposing team in this four-versus-four multiplayer mode. The team that still has remaining warriors will automatically win the match.
- Tribute: A four-versus-four multiplayer mode where teams attempt to gather offerings and place them on their shrine. Each of the three offering gives the team a special power-up. The first team to capture all three offerings and defend them until the timer ends wins or the team with the most offerings at the end of the battle timer wins.
- Breach: A four-versus-four multiplayer mode where the attacker's goal is to lead a battering ram through two separate gates before fighting and killing 'The Commander'. While the defenders goal is to destroy the battle ram or keep the Commander alive. The attackers must complete a series of objectives such as capturing points, leading the battering ram to each of the two gates, breaking them both down and, ultimately, slaying the Commander; on the contrary, the defenders must prevent the attackers from completing all these objectives.

Once both gates are broken down, the Commander spawns and the attacking team gains a set amount of lives shared between the team corresponding to the battering ram's health when the second gate is broken down, If the lives shared between the attacking team hits zero the team becomes 'Breaking' and can no longer respawn unless revived. Forcing desperate melee for the Commander. The defenders can respawn infinitely, and win if they defeat each attacker while they are Breaking.

=== Arcade ===
The Marching Fire expansion introduced the solo/2 player co-op arcade mode for those who purchased the DLC (included in all game versions as of patch 2.50.0). Gameplay in arcade mode is a sequence of "chapters" within a "quest" in which the player faces 1-3 enemy AI. There are 5 difficulties of quests represented by the recommended "gear score". There is also a "Weekly Quest" that is a fixed difficulty. Gear score is the sum of your character's equipped gear levels and functions differently than in multiplayer. In arcade your damage and armor are proportional to gear score, meaning a player with 0 level gear score will deal a fraction of the damage to enemies in higher difficulties; and be dealt several times more damage. The recommended gear score begins at 0 for common quests and increases by 36 per level of difficulty, up to 144 at legendary. The maximum gear score of any player is 180, accomplished by having all six gear pieces at the max level of 30. Apart from gear requirements, difficulty also influences the amount of modifiers and the opposing AI intelligence. Before each chapter, the player is given a small interlude in which a simple story is presented. The potential opponents and modifiers are generally loosely tied to elements of the story but will have some degree of randomness. Weekly quests are unique in that they are always the same story over the course of the week. This includes the difficulty, modifiers, opponents, and arena or "map". Players can earn experience, steel and even complete orders (daily missions) within arcade.

=== The Faction War ===
Each online multiplayer match awards War Assets based on the outcome and the player's performance. These War Assets are then deployed in the Faction War – which stretches across all platforms – where they are used either to defend an allied territory or conquer a neighbouring one occupied by an enemy faction, with the most war assets deployed in a given territory determining the victor. Territories controlled are updated every six hours, while each round lasts for two weeks and each season lasts for ten weeks (five rounds). As the war progresses and territories change, the changing front will determine which maps that are played and their appearance (each map has variants depending on whether it is under Knight, Viking or Samurai control). Players who have distinguished themselves and helped their faction gain and defend ground earn higher quality equipment as spoils of war after each round and each season. After a season ends, the map is reset and a new season begins after an off-season period, but the outcome of the previous season impacts the story background of the new season.

=== Heroes ===
There are currently five factions in For Honor. The first three factions were introduced at game launch: Knights, Vikings, and Samurai. A Chinese-inspired fourth faction, the Wu Lin, was added with the Marching Fire expansion. The fifth faction, called The Outlanders, are a group of uniquely-themed warriors introduced in Y5S4 who have no cultural links to other factions, let alone each other. There are currently 9 heroes in the Knight faction, 8 in the Viking faction, 10 in the Samurai faction, 6 in the Wu Lin faction, and 6 in The Outlanders faction, making for a grand total of 39 playable heroes. Each hero has their own unique weapons and fighting styles.

== Single Player story ==
=== Setting ===
After a natural catastrophe pitted the most fearsome warriors against one another in a fight for resources and territory, the bloodthirsty warlord Apollyon believes the people of the Knights, Vikings, and Samurai have grown weak and wants to create an age of all-out war through manipulation of each faction. To this end the perspectives of characters within each faction are shown as events unfold, battles are waged, and agendas are created as Apollyon works to ensure continuous sparks of conflict between the Legion, the Warborn, and the Chosen from the Myre. With a later DLC, the Wu-Lin, based on Chinese culture, were added, while in-game lore links the Romans fighting for the Legion to a fifth Roman-based faction not present in the game.

=== Plot ===
The warmonger Apollyon takes control of the knights of the Blackstone Legion after murdering her rivals, who fight for the people of the land of Ashfeld, allowing her to sow the seeds of perpetual war and create stronger men to rule over the weak. During the Blackstone Legion's attempt to bring a dishonorable lord-turned-mercenary, Hervis Daubeny, to justice, his second-in-command, known as the Warden, helps to stop the Blackstone siege and battles the champion of the Blackstone knights. Upon defeating a Blackstone Legion captain, Ademar, the Warden is made a knight of the Legion by Holden Cross, Apollyon's lieutenant, and leaves with him. During his/her time in Apollyon's army, the Warden helps to defend against the Viking raiders of the Warborn, but soon realizes shortly after meeting with Apollyon that she cares nothing about protecting people and seeks to manipulate her enemies into endless battles. Starting with the Vikings, Apollyon and her warriors including Holden Cross, the Warden and fellow lieutenants Stone and Mercy, attack their settlements and sack their strongholds in the northern land of Valkenheim, leaving only enough food and supplies to fight over, and sparing those who would eagerly fight for those scraps or are strong enough to do so.

Afterwards, in Valkenheim, the Viking clans fight among themselves, killing one another for the dwindling scraps left by Apollyon. This continues until a powerful warrior known as Raider comes down from the mountains, and begins uniting the warriors of the various clans under the Warborn banner, alongside Warlord friend Stigandr, Valkyrie warrior Runa and Berserker Helvar, first by killing the brutal raider Ragnar, who steals what little remains from those who cannot feed themselves, and then Siv the Ruthless, who seeks to conquer and plunder their own people. After killing their rivals, Raider's rapidly growing army retake a Warborn stronghold from knights of Apollyon's army, and then set out to the land of the Myre to raid the Dawn Empire of the Chosen, a group of powerful Samurai, to resupply and feed their people. The Raider then leads the assault on the Samurai, kills the Samurai General, Tozen, and causes the Samurai to retreat back to their greatest city. In the chaos, Apollyon kills the Dawn Empire's ruler and his daimyōs that refuse to fight.

Into this chaos is brought the Orochi warrior known as the Emperor's champion, the strongest and most fearsome warrior in the Dawn Empire. The champion was imprisoned for speaking out of turn and was freed during the chaos of the Viking raid. The Orochi helps to push back the Vikings, but fails to prevent Apollyon from riding through the chaos and murdering the Imperial family, forcing the Daimyos to fight one another for supreme rulership as Emperor of the Dawn Empire. After learning of the devastation the Viking raid caused, the Orochi, fellow samurai Ayu, the Shugoki Okuma and Nobushi Momiji attempt to reunite the Daimyos under one banner, using Apollyon as a common enemy to rally against. The Emperor's Champion infiltrates the Emperor's palace with Momiji and confronts Seijuro, the Daimyo who took Apollyon's offer to become Emperor. After defeating Seijuro, the champion convinces him to join him against Apollyon. It is also during this time that the Emperor's Champion learns of Apollyon's manipulations of the various factions and rallies allies to stop Apollyon, invading Ashfeld to attack Blackstone Fortress. During a scouting mission with Momiji, the Orochi is met by the Warden, now leading the rebellious Iron Legion against Apollyon with Holden Cross, Stone and Mercy by his/her side, and after dueling him/her, realizes they are allied against the same enemy. Both armies besiege the castle on separate fronts, with the Orochi searching for Apollyon. After finding Apollyon, the Orochi fights with and kills her, but not before learning that she wanted to create eternal war to weed out the weak and create the strongest of men, making them evermore bloodthirsty. Despite her death, Apollyon got what she wanted: an age of bloodthirsty wolves.

In the aftermath, the armies of all three factions attacking the Blackstone Fortress; Knight, Samurai and Viking alike all turn on each other, resulting in a war lasting seven years. Realizing the war's futility, the Warden, now leader of the Iron Legion, sends Holden Cross to meet with the jarl of the vikings, Stigandr, and the samurai Ayu. Though all three realize that the prospect of peace may be futile, they all agree that peace is worth fighting for and striving for it will make for an unforgettable tale.

== Multiplayer Story ==
=== Year 1 ===
==== Season 1: Apollyon ====
This season revisits the events of the original campaign. Following the death of Apollyon, the temporary alliance between the Knights, Vikings, and Samurai collapses, and the factions once again turn against one another. With no unifying threat remaining, Heathmoor descends back into a prolonged state of conflict.

==== Season 2: Shadow & Might ====
As the conflict between the factions escalates, both the Knights and the Samurai turn to long-held reserves to gain an advantage. The Samurai summon the Shinobi, covert warriors trained in stealth and agility, while the Knights revive the legacy of a bygone empire by calling upon the Centurions, disciplined officers renowned for their battlefield precision.

==== Season 3: Grudge & Glory ====
With no end to the conflict in sight, the Knights continue to draw from their past, enlisting the Gladiators—fighters long accustomed to arenas and duels rather than open warfare—now seeking glory on an actual battlefield. In response to increasing pressure from both the Knights and the Samurai, the Vikings call upon the Highlanders, resilient warriors bound by ancient oaths who return to aid their allies in the struggle for Heathmoor.

==== Season 4: Order & Havoc ====
As the fighting drags on, both the Samurai and the Vikings turn to their more unpredictable allies to sustain the war effort. The Samurai enlist the Aramusha, wandering warriors without masters who pursue their own ambitions rather than the defense of their homeland. In turn, the Vikings call upon the Shamans, fierce and feral fighters who stalk their enemies with animalistic intensity. Their arrival signals a growing desperation across Heathmoor, echoing Apollyon’s original aim of allowing the most ruthless individuals within each faction to rise to prominence.

=== Year 2 ===
==== Season 1: Age of Wolfs ====
As the game reached its first anniversary, the season focused primarily on gameplay improvements, balance updates, and quality-of-life changes. Since the emphasis was on refining core systems rather than expanding the narrative, this season did not introduce significant new lore.

==== Season 2: Heroes March ====
As the war in Heathmoor continues, stories begin to circulate of newly emerging champions whose strength and resolve inspire the rank-and-file to persevere. These figures rise as symbols of courage for their factions, offering renewed morale amid the prolonged conflict.

==== Season 3: Reigning Inferno ====
As time passes, the land of Heathmoor begins to show signs of upheaval. Volcanoes erupt, tempests grow more violent, and fears of a new cataclysm spread across the factions. In response, each faction escalates its assaults, blaming the others for the worsening natural disasters. Amid this rising turmoil and mutual suspicion, Heathmoor is left vulnerable to an external threat soon to emerge.

==== Season 4: Marching Fire ====
While the three factions remain focused on their ongoing conflicts, they are caught off guard by the arrival of a new force: the Wu Lin. Having fled the collapse of their own empire, the Wu Lin seek to claim Heathmoor as their new homeland. Under the leadership of Gao Lei, they quickly establish a strong foothold. By the time the other factions shift their attention to this emerging power, the Wu Lin have already secured their place—making it clear they intend to remain in Heathmoor.

== Development ==
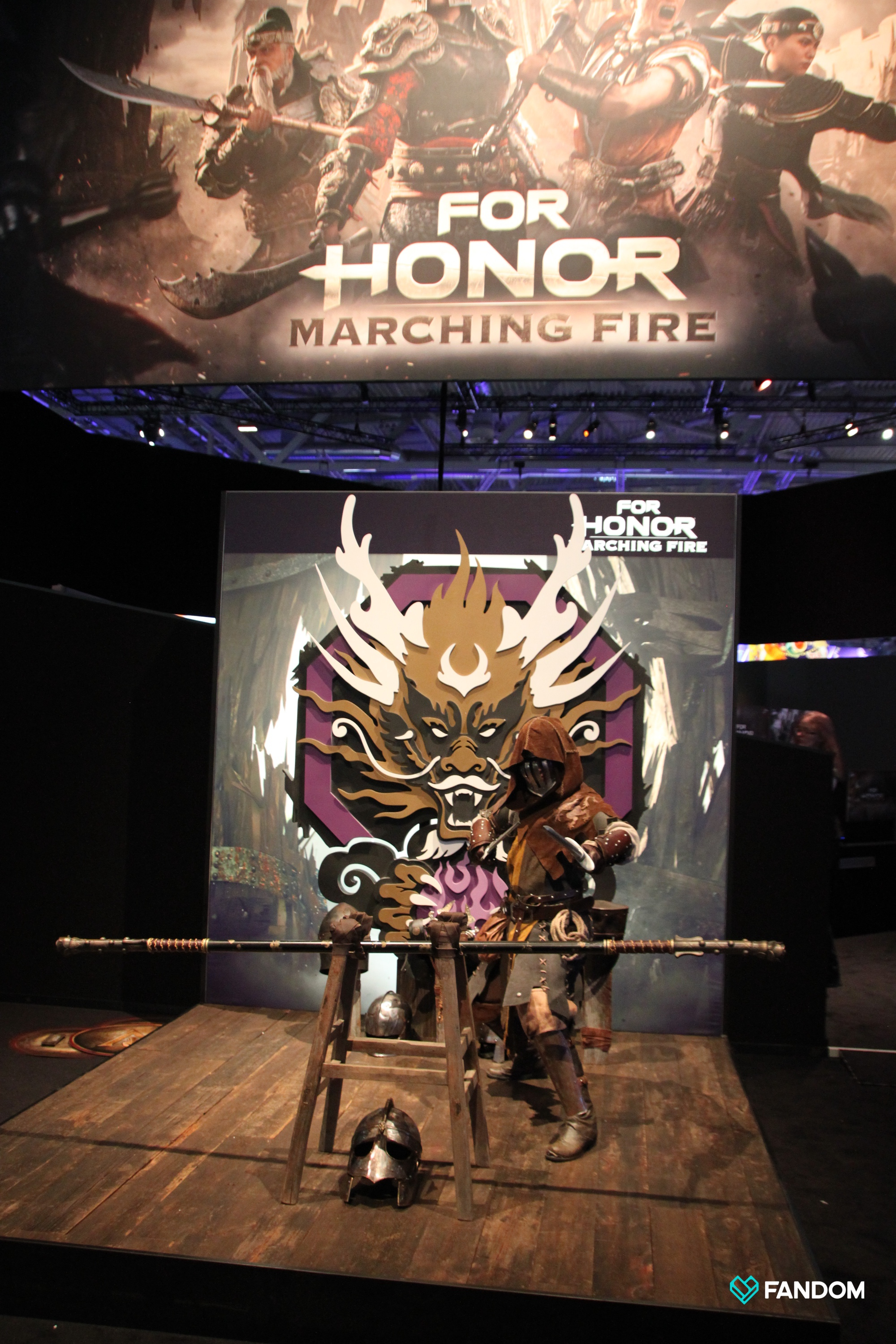
Booth at Gamescom 2018

For Honor was developed by Ubisoft Montreal. Blue Byte developed the game's PC version. It was announced during Ubisoft's E3 2015 press conference. A CGI trailer and a gameplay demo were shown during the conference. Development of the game began in 2012. For Honor was the company's first attempt at developing a strategy-action game. The structure of the game is inspired by shooter games. The game was released worldwide for PlayStation 4, Windows, and Xbox One on February 14, 2017. The game's original score was written and produced by film composers Danny Bensi, Saunder Jurriaans and Owen Wallis. A 20-track original soundtrack released alongside the game on February 14. On July 27, 2018, the game was announced to be joining the Xbox Games With Gold program.

The documentary Playing Hard shows the development of the game, from an idea of Jason Vandenberghe up to release.

The game features a Dolby Atmos soundtrack.

The Warden was later included as a playable DLC character in SNK's 2019 fighting game Samurai Shodown on June 24, 2020.

From October 21, 2021, to November 11, 2021, a Dead by Daylight crossover event called Survivors of the Fog was held. The event featured Dead by Daylight-inspired cosmetic items and a limited-time game mode that featured one of the game's original characters, the Trapper, as an AI-controlled enemy.

== Reception ==
Reception

Aggregate score
Aggregator	Score
Metacritic	PC: 76/100; PS4: 78/100; XONE: 79/100

Review scores
Publication	Score
Destructoid	5.5/10
Electronic Gaming Monthly	7/10
Game Informer	8.25/10
GameRevolution	4/5
GameSpot	8/10
GamesRadar+	4/5
IGN	8/10
PC Gamer (US)	74/100
Polygon	8/10
VideoGamer.com	7/10

For Honor received "generally favorable" reviews, according to video game review aggregator Metacritic.

PC Gamer awarded it a score of 74/100, saying "A tense, tactical medieval brawler that will reward anyone with the patience and will to master it."

Eurogamer ranked the game 25th on their list of the "Top 50 Games of 2017". The game won the People's Choice Award for "Best Fighting Game" in IGN's Best of 2017 Awards.

=== Sales ===
In Japan, For Honor debuted as the top-selling video game during its first week of release (February 13 to 19, 2017), selling 40,062 copies, according to Media Create. In the U.S., it was the top-selling video game of February 2017, according to The NPD Group's tracking of retail and some digital sales. In the UK, it was the best-selling game during the week ending February 18, 2017, according to Chart-Track data, which excludes digital sales. The game ranked seventh worldwide in digital sales of console games during February 2017, according to SuperData Research's digital sales report, selling over 700,000 digital copies for all three platforms.

=== Accolades ===
Year	Award	Category	Result	Ref.
2016	Gamescom 2016	Best PC Game	Won	
2016	Gamescom 2016	Best PlayStation 4 Game	Won	
2016	Gamescom 2016	Best Xbox One Game	Nominated	
2016	Gamescom 2016	Best Action Game	Nominated	
2016	Gamescom 2016	Best Multiplayer Game	Nominated	
2018	21st Annual D.I.C.E. Awards	Outstanding Achievement in Animation	Nominated	
2018	Italian Video Game Awards	People's Choice	Nominated	
2018	Game Critics Awards 2018	Best Ongoing Game	Nominated	
