= All Star Tennis '99 =

1998 video game

- European Nintendo 64 cover art, featuring Michael Chang and Jana Novotná
- Developer: Smart Dog
- Publisher: Ubi Soft
- Platforms: Nintendo 64, PlayStation, Game Boy Color
- Release: PlayStation: PAL: November 20, 1998; Nintendo 64: PAL: January 1999; NA: August 31, 1999; Game Boy Color: PAL: June 25, 1999
- Genre: Sports
- Modes: Single player, multiplayer

All Star Tennis '99 is a simulation tennis game for the Nintendo 64, PlayStation, and Game Boy Color released in 1999, that was developed by Smart Dog and published by Ubi Soft. The featured player on the US and Europe versions is Michael Chang while in the French version the featured player is Yannick Noah who has his name above the title as Yannick Noah All Star Tennis '99. It was one of the first tennis games for the N64 and the only one for that system in the USA until Mario Tennis. It was preceded by Let's Smash/Centre Court Tennis in Japan and Europe, for the Nintendo 64, while being one of many tennis games on PlayStation and Game Boy Color.

== Gameplay ==
It offered standard simulation game play with singles, doubles and tournament mode, as well as World Tour mode consisting of 11 international competitions. In addition to standard moves the player can turn on an option for three specialty moves, two of which are unique to the character that they are using, each time a player scores a point they are given 1 of 3 energy points that can be used to perform one of the two unique moves for their character. There is a Bomb Tennis mode that makes a bomb appear where the ball touches down, if the player is caught by its explosion, it causing the character to be knocked off their feet for a few seconds.

== Reception ==
Reception

Aggregate score
Aggregator	Score
GameRankings	55%

Review scores
Publication	Score
AllGame	2.5/5
Consoles +	89%
Electronic Gaming Monthly	5/10; 5.5/10; 5.5/10; 5.5/10
Famitsu	22/40
Game Informer	5.5/10
GameFan	68/100; 61/100
GamePro	3.5/5; 3.5/5; 4.5/5; 4/5
GameRevolution	D
GameSpot	5.1/10
IGN	7/10
N64 Magazine	68%
Next Generation	1/5
Nintendo Power	6.9/10

The Nintendo 64 version received mixed reviews according to the review aggregation website GameRankings. GameFan and Nintendo Power gave it average reviews, over three months before its U.S. release date. Jeffrey Adam Young of NextGen said, "For tennis purists, this game is a net loss – for gamers looking for a good time, the control issues make the game unacceptable." In Japan, where the PlayStation version was ported for release on December 2, 1999, Famitsu gave it a score of 22 out of 40.
