= Battle Isle: The Andosia War =

2000 video game

- Developer: Cauldron
- Publisher: Blue Byte
- Series: Battle Isle
- Platform: Windows
- Release: November 24, 2000
- Genre: Turn-based strategy
- Modes: Single-player, multiplayer

Battle Isle: The Andosia War (German: Battle Isle: Der Andosia Konflikt) is a 2000 turn-based strategy video game developed by Cauldron and published by Blue Byte for the Windows. It is the fifth and final game in the Battle Isle series. The game was sold in North America exclusively on Blue Byte's online store.

== Gameplay ==
The game is set in an archipelago on the planet Chromos in the year 345 of the New Age. The islands are split into battle and economic islands. Factories on the economic isle build units that need to be transported to the battlefield. Combat units have different attack and defense strengths and movement ratings. The game is turn-based but the player must move units within a fixed amount of time before the opposition takes its turn. The player can't move units but can develop their economy during the opposing turn. Supply comes from energy relay posts that must be connected to your military headquarters. Repair units can fix things on the battlefield if they're near a functional energy post. The game includes two campaigns with a total of 22 missions. Multiplayer supports LAN and Internet play. Modes offered are 1v1, 2v2 or 4v4 players.

== Reception ==
Reception

Aggregate score
| Aggregator | Score |
|---|---|
| GameRankings | 77% |

Review scores
| Publication | Score |
|---|---|
| GameSpot | 6.7/10 |
| GameSpy | 76/100 |
| GameZone | 10/10 |
| IGN | 7.5/10 |
| Génération 4 | 15/20 |
| Gry-Online | 6.5/10 |

GameSpy gave an overall positive review: graphics and music were praised but the camera controls were said to be clunky and the game had too much micromanagement. GameSpot commented: "The 3D graphics actually serve a purpose besides just looking good, but the game's central assumption - that a restricting time limit applied to a turn-based game will make it more intense - doesn't quite work." IGN summarized: "Overall, Battle Isle: Andosia War gets by largely on strong visual and visceral merits. The interface is very well conceived, the combat engine is compelling and the 3D engine is damned attractive, but it is simply not a strong enough product to rise above the competition in either the real-time or turn-based space. Additionally, the inane storyline and often-excruciating pace of play make this hard game to recommend." GameZone liked the imposed time limit: "The game is a race against the clock game and this gives the game a real feel of war where there is not always a lot of time to make a good strategically thought out decisions and the one you make better be a good one. This make the game a high paced game on all levels and gives you excellent challenge which is exactly what you look for in any war type game."
