= Jimmy Connors Pro Tennis Tour =

1992 video game

- North American cover art
- Developer: Blue Byte
- Publisher: Ubi Soft
- Platform: Super Nintendo Entertainment System
- Release: NA: December 1992; JP: October 29, 1993; PAL: October 27, 1994
- Genre: Sports (tennis)
- Modes: Single-player, multiplayer

Jimmy Connors Pro Tennis Tour is a video game developed by Blue Byte and published by Ubisoft and released in December 1992 for the Super Nintendo Entertainment System. It is the third game in the Pro Tennis Tour series developed by Blue Byte. It follows 1989's Pro Tennis Tour and 1991's Pro Tennis Tour 2. An 8-bit console version, Jimmy Connors Tennis, was developed by NMS Software and released in 1993.

== Cancelled port ==
A port of Jimmy Connors Pro Tennis Tour for the Atari Jaguar was announced in November 1993 after Ubi Soft was signed to be a third-party developer by Atari Corporation for the system, while Ubi Soft considered in releasing three more titles for the console. Despite kept being advertised and slated for an October/November 1994 launch, it was never released for unknown reasons.
