= Chewy: Esc from F5 =

1995 video game

- Developer: New Generation Software
- Publisher: Play Byte
- Director: Carsten Wieland
- Programmers: Helmut Theuerkauf; Alexander Diessner
- Artists: Carsten Wieland; Nihat Keesen; Stefan Frank
- Writers: Helmut Theuerkauf; Alexander Diessner; Carsten Wieland; Wolfgang Walk
- Composers: Carsten Wieland; Stelter Studios
- Platforms: MS-DOS, Windows
- Release: 1995: MS-DOS; 1997: Windows
- Genre: Adventure

Chewy: Esc from F5 (German: Chewy: Esc von F5) is a 1995 point-and-click adventure released for MS-DOS compatible operating systems in 1995. A Microsoft Windows version followed in 1997.

== Plot ==
The game is about a cute pink alien called Chewy, who along with his partner Clint goes on a mission to break into the Borxian high security zone called F5, to steal the powerful "Red Glump" so that the Borx can't use it for their evil plans. Chewy's partner Clint manages to steal the glump and escapes with it from the pursuing Borkian starships, but his spaceship gets caught in a wormhole during the chase and crashes on a planet called Earth.

== Gameplay ==
The game is a point-and-click adventure which sees player handle items, interact with characters, and solve puzzles to advance through the story.

== Reception ==
Tap-Repeatedly/Four Fat Chicks gave the game 80/100, writing "There's nothing groundbreaking here, no radical new interface or slick engine, no strikingly addictive gaming paradigms. Just a cool old-school adventure with good puzzles, fun characters and lots of eye candy."
