= Unreal (1990 video game) =

- Cover art by Tim White
- Developer: Ordilogic Systems
- Publisher: Ubi Soft
- Programmers: Yann Robert; Yves Grolet
- Artists: Franck Sauer; Marc Albinet
- Composer: Maniacs of Noise
- Platforms: Amiga, Atari ST, MS-DOS
- Release: 1990: Amiga; 1991: MS-DOS, ST
- Genres: Rail shooter, platform
- Mode: Single-player

Unreal is a video game released by Ubi Soft for the Amiga in 1990. The game, divided in 8 chapters, combined two different genres: In five levels, the player controls a pterodactyl-like creature in a pseudo-3D rail shooter environment. Three levels are side-scrolling platform games where the player controls a barbarian fighting monsters and solving puzzles. Ports for MS-DOS compatible operating systems and Atari ST were released in 1991.

== Plot ==
The backstory, as well as an extensive mythology of the fictional world (also called "Unreal") is given in the game manual.

A creator being called Sleeper, sent his servant Fragor to Unreal to create life with some life-giving eggs. Fragor was hit by a comet and fell on Unreal releasing chaotic forces on the planet. While the elements were separated or mixed in uncontrollable ways, the eggs formed life on the planet. Forces of evil dominated the elements while the evil Polymorphe, who has the form of a floating flaming head, became absolute master. Unknown to him the civilization of the Barbares was created out of a single egg which fell in a secluded valley.

Two Barbares, Artaban and Isolde, befriend a dragon named Dracus who came from the sky. When Dracus did not show up for some time, Isolde was caught by Polymorphe's servants while calling for him. Imprisoned in a dungeon, she was ordered to marry him, or Polymorphe would kill all life in the valley. Dracus and Artaban prepare to go to her rescue, and a mysterious wizard equips Artaban with an ancient sword forged from Fragor's comet.

The objective of the game is to guide Artaban (either on foot or riding Dracus on his back) to the Burning Sea where Polymorphe's Flying Castle is found.

== Gameplay ==
The game combined two different gameplay genres. Both Galaxy Force and Rastan Saga were inspirations for the game.

In five of the chapters, the player (as Artaban) guides Dracus as they fly over a natural landscape (forests, river canyons, glaciers or seas of lava). The gameplay of those levels are of a 3d scrolling shooters, the view being from behind Dracus. The player must avoid obstacles (like trees or spires of rock) and adversaries that come from the distance. Dracus fires fireballs that can destroy some of the monsters or parts of the scenery.

Dracus can fire more and stronger fireballs, when the player collects power-ups that appear on the ground. The player can attain 12 levels of firepower, but whenever the player crashes on the scenery, Dracus loses a level. Other bonuses include restoration of health and some limited invincibility.

The other parts of the game are of the platform arcade-adventure genre. The player guides Artaban on foot traversing forests, swamps and castles. He encounters adversaries which can be killed with the sword. The sword gives some limited interaction with the environment: and can be "charged" by touching fire found at some points of the levels; there are also some kinds of spells that give Artaban the power to hurl water or fireballs with the sword. The sword also is used for some puzzles.

The player has 100 health points. In the beginning of each level, the player is awarded 50 lost health points. There is also the option to save the game in 3 available slots.

== Release ==
The cover artwork, as well as the title screen, is a reproduction of the cover of the 1979 book Lord of The Spiders by Michael Moorcock.

The original artwork is designed by Tim White.

== Reception ==
Allen L. Greenberg reviewed the game for Computer Gaming World, and stated that "Overall, the effect is that the game lacks polish. Potential players, therefore, may be unwilling to invest their time and money in searching for the game's "gems" which lie scattered in the raw."

The January 1991 issue of Amiga Joker named Unreal the second Best Action Game of 1990.

The game was also nominated for the Gen D'or award for best art.
