= Battle Isle 2200 =

1994 video game

- European cover art
- Developer: Blue Byte
- Publishers: EU: Blue Byte; NA: Accolade
- Series: Battle Isle
- Platform: MS-DOS
- Release: US: 1994; EU: 1994
- Genre: Turn-based strategy
- Modes: Single-player, multiplayer

Battle Isle 2200 (released as Battle Isle 2 in Europe and also known as Battle Isle II) is a strategy video game developed by Blue Byte for IBM PC compatibles and published by Accolade in 1994. It is the second entry in the science fiction themed Battle Isle series. The game is a turn-based, hex-based, strategy wargame. An expansion was released the same year.

== Plot ==
The player takes the role of Val Haris, the leader of the Drullian defence counsel on the planet Chromos in its war against the evil computer Titan-Net for control of the planet.

== Gameplay ==
A single-player campaign is included. The goal of each mission typically involves the destruction of enemy forces and the capture of various objectives.

== Development ==
Battle Isle 2200 was developed by the German company Blue Byte as a sequel to their Battle Isle game. It was the first CD-ROM strategy game with 3D combat and animation.

== Reception ==
In April 1994, the German magazine Power Play Magazine reviewed the game positively, giving it a score of 90%. The British magazine PC Review published a review of the game in its May 1994 edition in which the game was generally assessed positively, with the AI and the weather being particularly praised, and giving the game a score of 8/10 overall. A review of the game in the November 1994 issue of the US magazine Electronic Games written by Bill Kunkel praised the graphics and "user-friendly" gameplay and interface, though he criticised the lack of a demo-mode and the amount of documentation that the player had to read to understand the game. In January 1996 the US Computer Gaming World magazine praised the variety of the weapons systems in the game, and the "tenacious" AI, though the mission-structure of the game was criticised as "frustrating". The 1996 edition of CD-ROM Review praised the game, saying that it was "a finely made game with high quality graphics, sound, and gameplay."

== Expansion ==
An expansion disk for the game called Titan's Legacy (and sometimes referred to as Battle Isle II Data Disk I) was released in late 1994. The expansion sped up the AI, and introduced full networked multiplayer into the game, a feature that had been previously promised but left out of the launch version of Battle Isle 2. The expansion centres on a civil war that erupts on Chromos in the aftermath of the defeat of Titan-Net, and begins with the player playing as Val Haris as he escapes from kidnappers. The expansion received 8 out of 10 in a November 1994 review from PC Review magazine.

The game is included in the Battle Isle Platinum compilation released in September 2000.
