= Twinworld =

1989 video game

- Developer: Blue Byte
- Publisher: Ubi Soft
- Composer: Haiko Ruttmann
- Platforms: Amiga, Atari ST, C64, Acorn Archimedes, Amstrad CPC, ZX Spectrum
- Release: 1989
- Genre: Platform
- Mode: Single-player

Twinworld (also spelled TwinWorld or Twin World) is a video game, published by Ubi Soft for the Amiga and Atari ST in 1989. Ports for the Commodore 64, Amstrad CPC, and Acorn Archimedes were released in 1990.

Twinworld is a platform game with a fantasy setting. Ulopa is a prince and the sole survivor of the Cariken royal family. Ulopa must travel through 23 levels to find the stolen amulet and confront the evil wizard Maldur.

== Gameplay ==
Screenshot from the first level, encountering a Bothria

Screenshot from the second world, Dark Forest

The 23 levels are set in five different "worlds": a normal rural landscape, a forest, a medieval-style fortress, swamps and finally the temple of the evil wizard Maldur. The first four "worlds" have five levels each, and Maldur's temple has three, with the last being a special "boss" level.

The gameplay mainly involves jumping between different platforms and shooting magical bouncy balls at enemies, which come in the form of various evil-looking fantasy animals. To complete a level, Ulopa must find a piece of the stolen amulet and go through the exit door.

=== Enemies ===
Various enemies in Twinworld include:

Argous
A predatory bird. It comes in two varieties: one flies around the screen in a pre-defined pattern, the other homes in on Ulopa. Takes three hits.
Bothria
Arguably the most dangerous enemy. A three-headed dragon that initially stands motionless, but shooting it splits it into three separate monsters, one walking and the other two flying, each taking several hits. One of the flying monsters will try to escape to the level exit, and if it succeeds, start firing bullets when encountered again. The other flying monster will chase the player akin to the second variety of Argous.
Goulou
Resembles a troll or a goblin. Takes three hits.
Green Goulou
A kind of lizard. Initially takes one hit, but later two hits. In Maldur's Temple, Green Goulous learn to fly.
Hiboussa
Resembles an owl. Sits motionless on a tree branch, but will swoop down towards Ulopa if he passes underneath it. Takes four or five hits.
Maldur
The boss enemy of the entire game. He only appears on the last level. He initially is only on the background, summoning various other enemies, but at the end of the level, he transforms into a giant dragon, shooting bullets at Ulopa and taking many hits to kill. Maldur is the last enemy in the game.

== Worlds ==
The levels are divided into five different worlds.

"Caves"
The first world is the only one without a name. It is a rural landscape, with various cliff formations that Ulopa can walk on. Spread throughout the landscape are doors, where Ulopa can enter caves. Inside the caves, Ulopa can collect jewels for bonus points. There are also tunnels leading back to the surface and to other parts of the caves.
In the first world, falling through the bottom of the screen on the surface landscape will kill Ulopa, instead of dropping him down to the caves.

Dark Forest
The Dark Forest consists of trees that are over ten times as tall as Ulopa. The screen is divided between the tree roots and the tree tops. Doors on the tree trunks lead between the root and top parts, and if Ulopa falls from a tree top, he drops down to the root part. In the forest, Ulopa can collect various flowers and fruits for bonus points.
In the Dark Forest, the game introduces two new items: an eye which makes Ulopa temporarily invulnerable, and a parachute which allows him to fall down from greater heights. The Hiboussa only appears in the Dark Forest.

Blackthorn
Blackthorn is a fortress with a moat under it. As in the previous worlds, doors lead between the different parts, and Ulopa can drop down from the fortress into the moat underneath. In Blackthorn, Ulopa can collect various pieces of jewellery for bonus points. Also, Ulopa's appearance seems to change when he reaches Blackthorn. He has a hat and a beard, indicating that he possibly ages during the game.
The moat in Blackthorn is the only part of the game that is filled with water. This affects Ulopa's movements, giving him greater inertia. He also swims when he jumps, allowing him to make longer jumps and float down more slowly. Various kinds of fish appear as the enemies in the moat.

Swamps of Montain
The Swamps of Montain mostly resemble the first world, except in this case Ulopa can drop down into the gold mines below the ground when he falls through the bottom of the screen. On the surface, Ulopa can collect flowers and fruits, and in the mines, he can collect gold for bonus points.
In the Swamps of Montain, blue bullets (Ulopa's most powerful weapon) do not disappear after they hit an enemy, but instead keep bouncing onwards. This allows Ulopa to kill more enemies with a single bullet.

Maldur's Temple
Maldur's Temple only consists of three levels, rather than five. Two of them are normal levels, and on the third level, Ulopa finally faces Maldur himself.
In Maldur's Temple, Ulopa can use doors and stairways to move through different parts of the levels. As in the previous world, blue bullets can kill more than one enemy.

All five worlds also have a "bonus level". For the first four worlds, the last level of the world acts as a bonus level. In the last level of Maldur's Temple, after killing Maldur, a secret door opens to a mini-sized bonus level. If Ulopa dies in a bonus level, he automatically proceeds to the next world, without losing a life.

== Reception ==
Reception

Review score
Publication	Score
ASM	10/12

"It is an excellent game which is an insane lot of fun."
Bernd Zimmermann in ASM issue 2/1990
