= Redline Racer =

1998 video game

- Developer: Criterion Games
- Publisher: Ubi Soft
- Artists: Michael Williamson; Trevor Moore
- Platforms: Microsoft Windows, Dreamcast, Game Boy Color
- Release: Windows: UK: March 1998; NA: 10 August 1998; Suzuki Alstare Extreme Racing: UK: 23 June 2000; NA: 12 December 2000; Dreamcast: JP: 29 April 1999; NA: 11 November 1999; EU: 26 November 1999; Game Boy Color: UK: November 1999
- Genre: Racing
- Modes: Single-player, multiplayer

Redline Racer (Suzuki Alstare Extreme Racing for the European and North American Dreamcast release, European Game Boy Color release and Microsoft Windows re-release) is a racing game that was developed by Criterion Games and published by Ubi Soft.

== Gameplay ==
The player controls a motorcycle racer and starts every race from the last position. There are three tracks and three bikes to choose from at first, with more becoming available (10 tracks and 8 bikes in total) as the player wins the races on each of the tracks. The player can also choose the team that the racer belongs to, as well as the racer's sex. All the tracks are set in different environments: a canyon, a tropical island without a highway, an area full of orchards, etc. A race lasts for three laps.

== Development ==
The game was first mentioned in January 1998. The Game Boy Color version was one of a number of Ubi Soft games for the platform that utilized the "Ubi Key" feature, allowing players to share data between games via the system's infrared port and unlock extra content.

== Reception ==
=== Redline Racer ===
Redline Racer

Aggregate score
Aggregator	Score
GameRankings	67%

Review scores
Publication	Score
CNET Gamecenter	4/10
Computer Games Strategy Plus	2.5/5
Computer Gaming World	2.5/5
Edge	7/10
Game Informer	7/10
GamePro	4/5
GameRevolution	A−
GameSpot	6.7/10
IGN	7/10
Next Generation	3/5
PC Accelerator	7/10
PC Gamer (UK)	50%
PC Gamer (US)	69%

The game received "average" reviews according to the review aggregation website GameRankings. Next Generation called it "just another average racing game with which to pass the time. It is a shame because Redline Racer does look really good."

=== Suzuki Alstare Extreme Racing ===
Suzuki Alstare Extreme Racing

Aggregate scores
Aggregator	Score	
Aggregator	Dreamcast	PC
GameRankings	56%	66%
Metacritic	N/A	55/100

Review scores
Publication	Score	
Publication	Dreamcast	PC
AllGame	2.5/5	N/A
CNET Gamecenter	5/10	N/A
Electronic Gaming Monthly	5.875/10 (Note: In Electronic Gaming Monthly's review of the Dreamcast version, two critics gave it each a score of 6/10, one gave it 5/10, and the other gave it 6.5/10.)	N/A
Eurogamer	N/A	5/10
Famitsu	26/40	N/A
Game Informer	7/10	N/A
GameFan	40%	N/A
GamePro	4/5	N/A
GameSpot	6/10	5.1/10
GameSpy	6/10	N/A
GameZone	N/A	9/10
IGN	4/10	5/10
Next Generation	1/5	N/A
PC Gamer (UK)	N/A	64%

The PC version of Suzuki Alstare Extreme Racing received "mixed" reviews according to the review aggregation website Metacritic. Jeff Lundrigan of NextGen said that the Dreamcast version "has the Suzuki team license (obviously) and some fairly decent graphics, but that's about it. In fact, on the whole, it's about as generic as they come." In Japan, where the same Dreamcast version was released first under the name Redline Racer (レッドラインレーサー, Reddorain Rēsā) on 29 April 1999, Famitsu gave it a score of 26 out of 40.

== See also ==
- Suzuki TT Superbikes
