= B.A.T. (video game) =

1989 video game

- Developer: Computer's Dream
- Publisher: Ubi Soft
- Designers: Hervé Lange; Olivier Cordoléani
- Platforms: Amiga, Amstrad CPC, Atari ST, Commodore 64, MS-DOS
- Release: 1989: Atari ST; 1990: Amiga, C64, MS-DOS; 1991: Amstrad
- Genres: Adventure, role-playing
- Mode: Single-player

B.A.T. (Bureau of Astral Troubleshooters) is a futuristic point and click adventure game with some role-playing video game elements. It was first released in 1989 and available on several home computer platforms, mostly in 1990 and 1991. It was developed by Computer's Dream and published by Ubisoft. A sequel, B.A.T. II – The Koshan Conspiracy, was released in 1992.

== Atari ST dongle ==
The Atari ST version shipped with a dongle promoted as a 16-channel sound card which was required to play the game. Headphones or external speakers were needed to hear the audio. The card contains a 12-bit DAC, giving the dynamic range for 16 simultaneous 8-bits samples at the expense of the CPU given the lack of DMA. The game audio itself only uses 4 simultaneous samples.

== Reception ==
Computer Gaming World praised the NPCs and graphics of the Amiga version of B.A.T., but criticized the combat, puzzles, user interface, and arcade sequences. The magazine advised traditional RPG fans to avoid the game.
