= The Adventures of Valdo & Marie =

1996 video game

The Adventures of Valdo and Marie
- Publisher(s): Ubi Soft
- Release: 1996
- Genre(s): Adventure, educational

The Adventures of Valdo & Marie (French: Les 9 Destins de Valdo) is a 1996 adventure educational video game for Windows by Ubi Soft Entertainment Software.

PC Team praised the game's commitment to being an educational historical adventure. Joystick felt it offered a beautiful experience to players. Personal Computer Magazine thought the game offered a "highly entertaining learning environment".

The game sold 100,000 copies in France alone.
