= Battle Isle (video game) =

1991 video game

- Developer: Blue Byte
- Publishers: GER: Blue Byte; EU/NA: Ubi Soft
- Producers: Lothar Schmitt; Thomas Hertzler
- Programmer: Bernhard Ewers
- Artist: Thorsten Knop
- Composers: Volker Struebing; Haiko Ruttmann; Chris Huelsbeck
- Series: Battle Isle
- Platforms: Amiga, MS-DOS
- Release: 1991
- Genre: Turn-based strategy
- Modes: Single-player, multiplayer

Battle Isle is a 1991 turn-based strategy video game developed by Blue Byte and published by Ubi Soft for the Amiga and MS-DOS. It is the first game in the Battle Isle series. Two official expansion packs were released: Data Disk I in 1992 and The Moon of Chromos in 1993. An unofficial expansion, Battle Field Creator, was released in 1994. An Atari ST version was advertised but never released.

== Gameplay ==
The game is played on a hexagonal grid. The goal is to take control of an island by defeating the enemy. This can be achieved by eliminating all enemy units or capturing their headquarters. The gameplay has two phases: movement and action. In the movement phase, units can be moved around. During the action phase, you can attack other units, storm buildings, and defend your own units. The game includes 32 scenarios and a two-player mode.

== Reception ==
Reception

Review scores
Publication	Score
Amiga Format	90%
Computer Gaming World	3.5/5 (Amiga, DOS)
The One	88% (Amiga)
Play Time	90% (Amiga, DOS)

Amiga Format said: "The programmers, Blue Byte, have reinvented the war-game genre making a game fit for heroes. It's simple but possesses real gameplay depth." The One commented: "Battle Isle retains all the best elements of traditional, board based strategy games, but adds the accessibility offered by a computer, The control interface is so well designed that it shouldn't take you more than a quarter of an hour to learn how to use it effectively." Play Time said "Battle Isle is a brilliant product from the concept, playability, variety of details to the technically perfect execution." Computer Gaming World gave a positive preview of the game but criticized the lack of mouse control support. A year later, the game was called "[e]njoyable for the persistent gamer looking for new worlds to conquer."

== See also ==
- History Line: 1914-1918, Blue Byte's game that uses the same engine as Battle Isle
