= Puffy's Saga =

1989 video game

- Publisher: Ubi Soft
- Platforms: Amiga, Amstrad CPC, Atari ST, Commodore 64, ZX Spectrum
- Release: 1989
- Genre: Maze
- Modes: Single-player, multiplayer

Puffy's Saga is a maze video game released in 1989 by Ubi Soft.
