= Iron Lord =

1989 video game

- Developers: Orou Mama; Ivan Jacot
- Publisher: Ubi Soft
- Composer: Jeroen Tel (C64)
- Platforms: Atari ST, Archimedes, Atari ST, Amiga, MS-DOS, Amstrad CPC, Commodore 64, ZX Spectrum
- Release: 1989
- Genre: Adventure
- Mode: Single-player

Iron Lord is an adventure video game developed by Orou Mama and Ivan Jacot for the Atari ST and published by Ubi Soft in 1989. It was ported to the Amiga, Acorn Archimedes, Amstrad CPC, Commodore 64, ZX Spectrum, and MS-DOS.

== Reception ==
Reception

Award
Publication	Award
Amstrad Action	Mastergame

Computer Gaming World approved of Iron Lord's graphics but criticized its performance and load times, especially as the reviewed Amiga version could not run from a hard drive. The magazine nonetheless concluded that the game was "an above-average combination of adventure, strategy and action gaming". The game was reviewed in 1990 in Dragon #159 by Hartley, Patricia, and Kirk Lesser in "The Role of Computers" column. The reviewers gave the game 4 out of 5 stars.
