= Secrets of the Luxor =

1996 adventure video game

- Developer: Mojave
- Publisher: Ubi Soft
- Platforms: Windows, Macintosh
- Release: NA: April 4, 1996; EU: 1996
- Genre: Adventure

Secrets of the Luxor is a 1996 adventure video game developed by American studio Mojave and published by Ubi Soft for Macintosh, Windows, and Windows 3.x.

== Plot and game-play ==
The player is an archaeologist who is exploring an ancient pyramid. Upon discovering a powerful artifact left behind by an ancient civilization, the player must prevent it from being taken by antagonists.

The game features a point-and-click interface and static 3D rendered graphics.

== Production ==
The game was developed by Mojave, an offshoot of 3D-graphics architects Strata. The hintbook was cowritten by Utah-born Tanya Rizzuti and Adrian Ropp.

Luxor was one of two video game created by Mojave, the other being Sinkha.

In 1998, there was a promotion where German iMac buyers could additionally purchase the Play Max iMac Edition 1 with various titles including Luxor.

== Critical reception ==
Reception

Review score
Publication	Score
MacHome Journal	3.5/5

Adventure Gamers felt that the thrilling first third was let down by the remainder of the game. Metzomagic described it as a 'bargain bin purchase'. Tap Repeatedly wrote that while the game was well designed, some of the puzzles seemed to be mind bogglingly hard. Gameboomers appreciated the subtle hits of humour. MacHome Journal liked the " rich plot and exceptional graphics". Eblong wrote that the plot was "cheesy". MacHome's biggest criticism was that "it's so challenging you progress too slowly". The Daily Herald felt that while it was scant on story, its puzzles were too long. Just Adventure described it as "one of the few games to rise above the now-derogatory label of Myst clone". The Age praised the "wonderful 3D-images". MacAddict deemed it visually stunning.
