= Game, Net & Match =

1998 sports video game

- Developer: Media Games
- Publisher: Blue Byte
- Platform: Microsoft Windows
- Release: EU: 1998; NA: July 10, 1998
- Genre: Sports game
- Modes: Single player, multiplayer

Game, Net & Match! is a video game developed by German studio Media Games and published by Blue Byte for Windows in 1998.

== Reception ==
Reception

Aggregate score
Aggregator	Score
GameRankings	72%

Review scores
Publication	Score
CNET Gamecenter	8/10
Computer Games Strategy Plus	2/5
Computer Gaming World	3.5/5
GameSpot	8.2/10
GameStar	59%
Hyper	85%
IGN	6/10
Next Generation	3/5
PC Accelerator	6/10
PC Gamer (UK)	62%
PC Gamer (US)	65%
PC Zone	80%
The Cincinnati Enquirer	3.5/5

The game received above-average reviews according to the review aggregation website GameRankings. Next Generation said that the game "does a decent job of filling in for the lack of tennis games on the market."
