= Indiana Jones and the Last Crusade: The Action Game =

1989 video game

- Developers: Tiertex; NMS Software (NES, Game Boy)
- Publishers: U.S. Gold; Ubi Soft (NES, Game Boy)
- Composers: Mark Tait; Mark Cooksey (Game Boy/NES)
- Platforms: Amiga, Amstrad CPC, Atari ST, C64, DOS, Game Boy, Game Gear, MSX, Genesis, Master System, NES, ZX Spectrum
- Release: 1989–1994
- Genre: Action-adventure
- Mode: Single-player

Indiana Jones and the Last Crusade: The Action Game was published in 1989 by Lucasfilm Games, based on the film of the same name. The game was released for the ZX Spectrum, Amstrad CPC, Commodore 64, Atari ST, Amiga, IBM PC, MSX, Master System, NES, Game Boy, Sega Genesis and Game Gear.

It is a different game from Indiana Jones and the Last Crusade: The Graphic Adventure, also released in 1989. There is also a different game for the Nintendo Entertainment System titled Indiana Jones and the Last Crusade, released by Taito in 1991.

== Gameplay ==
The player moves through a series of side‑scrolling levels drawn from the film, beginning with a chase across a moving train where the player jumps between cars and avoids hazards, then entering a castle to navigate corridors, defeat guards, and locate key items, after which the player travels to Berlin to retrieve the diary while dodging enemies, proceeds to an airport sequence requiring careful movement past soldiers and obstacles, and finally reaches the Grail temple where the player advances through traps and timed challenges to obtain the Holy Grail.

== Reception ==
Reception

Review scores
Publication	Score						
Publication	Amiga	Atari ST	C64	Master System	NES	PC	ZX
ACE	590/1000	590/1000					
Amiga Format	77%						
Amstrad Action						83% (CPC)	
Computer and Video Games	81%	81%		85%			
Nintendo Power					12.5/20		
Raze				89%			
ST Format		90%					
The Games Machine (UK)	48%	48%				38% (CPC)	46%
Commodore Format			35%				
Compute!	3.75/5						
Console XS				80%			
VideoGame				8/10			

The game grossed £5,500,000 or $7,534,000 (equivalent to $20,000,000 in 2025) in worldwide sales across all platforms by 1994.

Computer Gaming World gave the game a negative review and said it was "just another search and recover game" with little to do with Indiana Jones. The review praised the graphics and sound, but found the fight sequences both too easy and too short, since all enemies could be defeated in one hit and turned their backs shortly after attacking the player. Compute! liked the Commodore 64 version, approving of the graphics and describing gameplay as "quite addicting", but criticizing lack of savegame and replay value.

It reached number one in the UK charts, replacing RoboCop which had held the top spot for a record 36 weeks.

Nintendo Power, reviewing the NES version, praised the action gameplay and noted that the music and levels helped recreate the feel of the movie. Nintendo Power was not impressed with the character graphics but stated that the animation "is quite good" for the NES. Nintendo Power praised the Game Boy version for its graphics, password system, and challenging gameplay, but criticized the poor "hit detection" and the time limits on each level, both of which made the game more difficult. The action game features six levels and a password feature. Game Players rated the NES version 52 percent.
