= Centre Court Tennis =

1998 video game

- Developer: Hudson Soft
- Publishers: JP: Hudson Soft; EU: Gaga Interactive Media
- Platform: Nintendo 64
- Release: JP: October 9, 1998; PAL: 1999
- Genre: Sports
- Modes: Single-player, multiplayer

Centre Court Tennis (Note: Known in Japan as Let's Smash (Japanese: Let's スマッシュ(レッツスマッシュ), Hepburn: Rettsu Sumasshu).) is a sports video game developed by Hudson Soft for the Nintendo 64. It was published by Hudson Soft in Japan on October 9, 1998, and by Gaga Interactive Media in Europe in 1999.

== Reception ==
Reception

Review scores
Publication	Score
Consoles +	89%
Famitsu	7/10, 7/10, 8/10, 7/10
Hyper	88/100
M! Games	72%
Mega Fun	79/100
MeriStation	8/10
N64 Magazine	67%
Video Games (DE)	52%
64 Magazine	90%
Fun Generation	7/10
GamePlay 64	82/100
Gamers' Republic	B+
N64 Pro	92%, 90%
Ultra 64	72%
X64	89%

Centre Court Tennis received generally favorable reviews from critics.
