= Rich Diamond =

1999 video game

- Developer: Core Concepts
- Publisher: Ubisoft
- Platform: Microsoft Windows
- Release: May 1999
- Genre: Puzzle
- Mode: Single-player

Rich Diamond is a puzzle video game developed by Core Concepts and published by Ubi Soft for Microsoft Windows.

== Gameplay ==
Rich Diamond is a puzzle game in which the player is a treasure hunter searching for diamonds in over eighty levels full of dangers and threats.

== Development ==
The game was the first title from Core Concepts, a company founded in February 1998 in San Gabriel, California.

== Reception ==
Next Generation reviewed the PC version of the game, rating it two stars out of five, and stated that "Rich Diamond has a pleasant feel and a sticker price under thirty dollars: reason enough, perhaps, for some to give it a glance. However, considering how many better puzzle games there are out there (often costing even less), the rest of us don't think it's much of a bargain."

Ronnie Gill for the Orlando Sentinel commented that "we found the game pretty cool and look forward to Core Concepts' next release."

Newsday commented that "The game functioned well and was responsive, although the screen sometimes stuttered when we tried to move to get the overview of another play area."

Mark Hill reviewed the game for PC Zone and rated it 20 out of 100, describing it as "frustrating, repetitive, and not very enjoyable."

Burt Hochberg reviewed the game for Games and stated "The puzzles in Rich Diamond seem just right: easy to start with, tougher by the time you've learned a few tricks, and really hard only when you're ready, since you don't get to try the tough puzzles until you've solved the easier ones. Kudos to the creator of this fine game."

Sean Miller for The Electric Playground reviewed the game and found it boring, saying that "Rich Diamond is a game that's graphics and concept belong more in the 80s than the 90s, making for a repetitive and unimaginative game. If you want a non-violent game with minimum excitement then this may be for you."
