= Ubisoft Blue Byte =

German video game company

Ubisoft Blue Byte GmbH
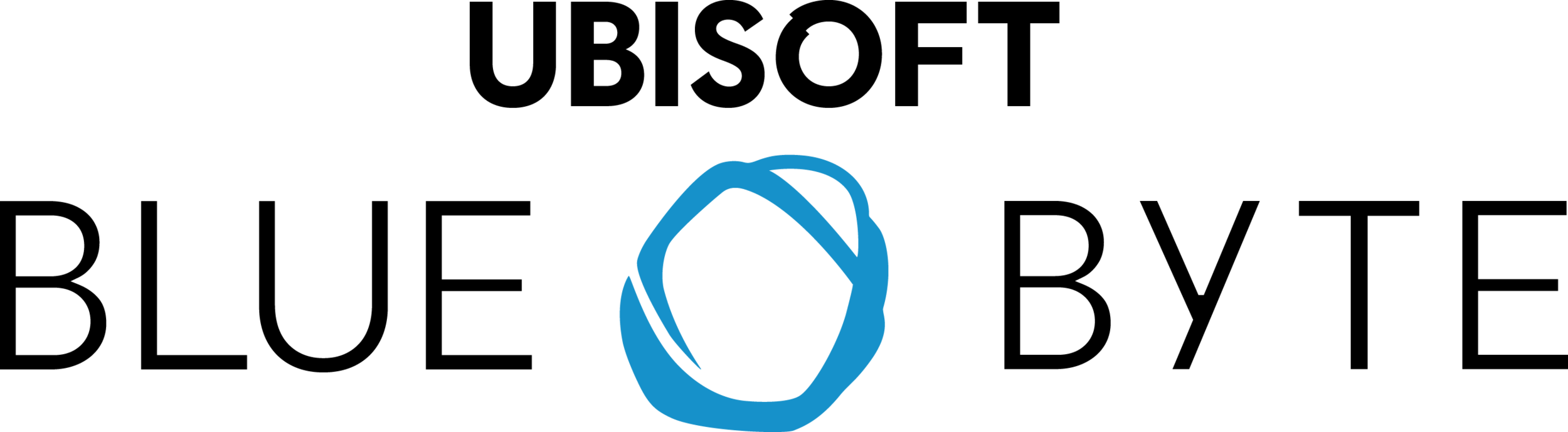
- Formerly: Blue Byte (1988–2017)
- Type: Subsidiary
- Industry: Video games
- Founded: October 1988; 38 years ago in Mülheim, Germany
- Founders: Thomas Hertzler; Lothar Schmitt
- Headquarters: Düsseldorf, Germany
- Number of locations: 3 studios (2020)
- Key people: Benedikt Grindel (managing director)
- Products: The Settlers; Battle Isle; Anno
- Number of employees: 695 (2024)
- Parent: Ubisoft (2001–present)
- Divisions: Ubisoft Berlin; Ubisoft Düsseldorf; Ubisoft Mainz
- Website: bluebyte.ubisoft.com

Ubisoft Blue Byte GmbH (Blue Byte until 2017) is a German video game holding company owned by Ubisoft. It was founded in October 1988 by Thomas Hertzler and Lothar Schmitt as a developer and is best known for developing the Anno and The Settlers series. The studio was acquired by Ubisoft in 2001. Related Designs was merged into Blue Byte in 2013, and a third studio in Berlin was established in 2018. Since 2019, Ubisoft Blue Byte acts as the parent company of Ubisoft's three German studios, which became branded as Ubisoft Düsseldorf, Ubisoft Mainz and Ubisoft Berlin. The three studios comprise 695 employees as of August 2024.

== History ==
=== Foundation and first games (1988–1993) ===
In 1988, Thomas Hertzler and Lothar Schmitt left Rainbow Arts, a German video game developer, and founded their own, Blue Byte, in October that year. To do so, Hertzler and Schmitt used a starting capital of 10,000 Deutsche Mark borrowed from Hertzler's parents and established an office in the attic of Hertzler's home in Mülheim.

Blue Byte's first published game was the tennis simulation Great Courts, released in 1989 by Ubi Soft (later renamed Ubisoft). Blue Byte's first big success in Germany and Europe was the turn-based strategy game Battle Isle, completed in 1991. Inspired by the Japanese game Nectaris for the PC Engine, Battle Isle spawned numerous add-ons and sequels, such as the World War I game History Line: 1914-1918. The company's next big success followed in 1993 with the release of the managerial game Die Siedler, marketed internationally as The Settlers. The Settlers also had numerous sequels and became the most well-known of Blue Byte's products.

=== Major projects (1994–2000) ===
Over the years, Blue Byte developed and/or published numerous innovative titles including Chewy: Escape from F5 and Albion, but most of them were not successful internationally. Efforts to break into the American market, usually aided with publishing by Accolade, failed and success was limited to Germany and parts of Europe. In 1995 a Chicago-based entrepreneur named Julian Pretto travelled to Germany and convinced the founders to open a North American office. Following the successful release of Battle Isle 2220 in the United States, Pretto left the firm to pursue other interests. Three years later, Blue Byte moved from Chicago, Illinois, to its new facilities in Austin, Texas.

The popular turn-based strategy Battle Isle series from the early 1990s achieved cult status similar to Settlers. However, when it was revised in 1997 as a 3-D tactical game Incubation similar to X-COM: UFO Defense and later in 2001 Battle Isle: The Andosia War, which tried to bridge the gap between turn-based strategies and real-time strategies, it alienated many players who came to expect that the Battle Isle brand would represent traditional turn-based strategies.

=== As a subsidiary of Ubisoft (2001–present) ===
In February 2001, Blue Byte was acquired by Ubi Soft and tasked to focus on Blue Byte's two most popular series. At the time of the acquisition, Blue Byte had a staff of 64 people and was active in the United Kingdom, Germany, and the United States.

Around 2013, Blue Byte worked with Related Designs on two of its titles including Might & Magic Heroes Online. Related Designs was acquired by Ubisoft in April 2013, from which point on the company would develop projects in tandem with Blue Byte. Related Designs was merged into Blue Byte in June 2014, becoming Blue Byte's second internal studio. In 2014, Blue Byte developed The Settlers: Kingdoms of Anteria. In 2015, the studio worked on Anno 2205. In 2016, the studio worked on Champions of Anteria, replacing The Settlers: Kingdoms of Anteria. The new game was a change from the original The Settlers series, with new gameplay. In 2017, the studio helped on the development for the game Skull & Bones. By late 2017, it had also worked on For Honor and Rainbow Six: Siege. In 2018, the studio announced The Settlers, the eighth game in the series. Blue Byte is also developing Anno 1800. The studio is also working on Beyond Good and Evil 2 together with Ubisoft Montpellier.

In 2017, Blue Byte was rebranded Ubisoft Blue Byte, with a new logo introduced just prior to the Gamescom event in August. A third Blue Byte studio in Berlin was announced in April 2017. The studio was formed out of a building formerly occupied by the Berliner Bank. Ubisoft Blue Byte's studio operations manager, Istvan Tajnay, became the new studio's studio manager. Although part of Ubisoft Blue Byte, the Berlin-based studio was intentionally named "Ubisoft Berlin". Ubisoft Berlin began operating in early 2018 and held its official opening on 25 September 2018, then employing 60 people. At the same time, Blue Byte's Düsseldorf and Mainz studios had 230 and 100 employees, respectively. At Gamescom in August 2019, Ubisoft Blue Byte revealed a new corporate identity in which its self-branded studios were renamed Ubisoft Düsseldorf and Ubisoft Mainz. The move primarily aimed at attracting further employees as Ubisoft Blue Byte expected to expand from 520 staff members at the time to 1,000 by 2023. All three studios remain under the Ubisoft Blue Byte legal umbrella. By December 2020, the "Ubisoft Blue Byte" branding was mostly phased out, with the previously stale social media channels deactivated. However, Ubisoft Blue Byte remained the legal parent to its three studios.

== Games developed or published ==
=== Pro Tennis Tour series ===
Title	Year	Developer	Publisher
Pro Tennis Tour	1989 (Amiga, Atari ST, DOS), 1990 (Amstrad CPC, C64, ZX Spectrum)	Blue Byte	Ubisoft
Pro Tennis Tour 2	1991 (Amiga, Atari ST, DOS)	Blue Byte	Ubisoft
Jimmy Connors Pro Tennis Tour	1992 (SNES)	Blue Byte	Ubisoft

=== Battle Isle series ===
Title	Year	Developer	Publisher
Battle Isle	1991 (Amiga, DOS)	Blue Byte	Blue Byte
Battle Isle Data Disk I	1992 (Amiga, DOS)	Blue Byte	Blue Byte
Battle Isle Data Disk II	1993 (Amiga, DOS)	Blue Byte	Blue Byte
Battle Isle II	1994 (DOS)	Blue Byte	Accolade
Battle Isle II Data Disk I	1994 (DOS)	Blue Byte	Blue Byte
Battle Isle III	1995 (Windows)	Blue Byte	Blue Byte
Incubation: Time Is Running Out	1997 (Windows)	Blue Byte	Blue Byte
Incubation: The Wilderness Missions	1997 (Windows)	Blue Byte	Blue Byte
Incubation: Hidden Worlds	1998 (Windows)	Blue Byte	Blue Byte
Battle Isle: The Andosia War	2000 (Windows)	Cauldron	Blue Byte

=== Settlers series ===
Title	Year	Developer	Publisher
The Settlers	1993 (Amiga), 1994 (DOS)	Blue Byte	Blue Byte
The Settlers II	1996 (DOS), 1997 (MacOS), 2007 (DS)	Blue Byte	Blue Byte
The Settlers III	1998 (Windows)	Blue Byte	Blue Byte
The Settlers IV	2001 (Windows)	Blue Byte	Ubi Soft & Gameloft
The Settlers: Heritage of Kings	2004 (Windows)	Blue Byte	Ubisoft
The Settlers II (10th Anniversary)	2006 (Windows)	Blue Byte	Ubisoft
The Settlers: Rise of an Empire	2007 (Windows)	Blue Byte	Ubisoft
The Settlers: Rise of Cultures	2008 (Windows)	Blue Byte	Ubisoft
The Settlers 7: Paths to a Kingdom	2010 (Windows)	Blue Byte	Ubisoft
The Settlers – My City	2010 (Windows)	Blue Byte	Ubisoft
The Settlers Online	2010 (Browser)	Blue Byte	Ubisoft
The Settlers: New Allies	2023	Blue Byte	Ubisoft

=== Anno series ===
Title	Year	Developer	Publisher
Anno Online	2013 (Browser)	Blue Byte	Ubisoft
Anno 1404	2009 (Windows)	Blue Byte, Related Designs	Ubisoft
Anno 2070	2011 (Windows)	Blue Byte, Related Designs	Ubisoft
Anno 2205	2015 (Windows)	Blue Byte	Ubisoft
Anno 1800	2019 (Windows)	Blue Byte	Ubisoft
Anno 117	2025 (Windows)	Blue Byte	Ubisoft

=== Other ===
Title	Year	Developer	Publisher
Twinworld	1989 (Amiga, Atari ST), 1990 (Acorn Archimedes, C64, ZX Spectrum)	Blue Byte	Ubisoft
Tom and The Ghost	1990 (Amiga, Atari ST, DOS)	Blue Byte	Ubisoft
Atomino	1990 (DOS), 1991 (Amiga, Atari ST, C64), 1994 (MacOS), 2002 (PalmOS, J2ME)	Blue Byte	Psygnosis
Apidya	1991 (Amiga), 2002 (Windows)	Kaiko	Play Byte
Ugh!	1992 (Amiga, C64, DOS)	Egosoft	Play Byte
History Line: 1914-1918	1992 (Amiga, DOS)	Blue Byte	Play Byte
Yo! Joe! Beat the Ghosts	1993 (Amiga, DOS)	Scipio	Play Byte
Albion	1995 (DOS), 2015 (Windows)	Blue Byte	Blue Byte
Dr. Drago's Madcap Chase	1995 (Windows)	Blue Byte	Blue Byte
Chewy: Esc from F5	1995 (DOS), 1997 (Windows)	New Generation Software	Blue Byte
Archimedean Dynasty	1996 (DOS), 2015 (Windows)	Massive Development	Blue Byte
Extreme Assault	1997 (DOS)	Blue Byte	Blue Byte
Game, Net & Match!	1998 (Windows)	Blue Byte	Blue Byte
Stephen King's F13	2000 (Windows, MacOS)	Blue Byte	Blue Byte
Your Shape: Fitness Evolved 2013	2012 (Wii U)	Blue Byte	Ubisoft
Silent Hunter Online	2013 (Browser)	Blue Byte	Ubisoft
Panzer General Online	2013 (Browser)	Blue Byte	Ubisoft
Might & Magic Heroes Online	2014	Blue Byte	Ubisoft
Tom Clancy's Rainbow Six Siege	2015 (Windows, PlayStation 4, Xbox One), 2020 (PlayStation 5, Xbox Series X|S)	Blue Byte	Ubisoft
Assassin's Creed Identity	2014 (iOS), 2016 (Android)	Blue Byte	Ubisoft
Champions of Anteria	2016 (Windows)	Blue Byte	Ubisoft
For Honor	2017 (Windows, PlayStation 4, Xbox One)	Blue Byte	Ubisoft
South Park: The Fractured but Whole	2017 (Windows, PlayStation 4, Xbox One, Nintendo Switch)	Blue Byte	Ubisoft
Far Cry 6	2021 (Microsoft Windows, PlayStation 4, PlayStation 5, Xbox One, Xbox Series X/S, Luna)	Blue Byte	Ubisoft
Avatar: Frontiers of Pandora	2023 (Microsoft Windows, PlayStation 5, Xbox Series X/S)	Blue Byte	Ubisoft
Beyond Good and Evil 2	TBA	Blue Byte	Ubisoft

== See also ==
- List of companies in Germany
- List of video game developers
