= Extreme Assault =

1997 action video game

- Developer: Blue Byte
- Publisher: Blue Byte
- Designer: Erik Simon
- Composers: Chris Hülsbeck, Fabian Del Priore
- Platform: MS-DOS
- Release: NA: July 22, 1997; EU: August 1997
- Genre: Action
- Modes: Single-player, multiplayer

Extreme Assault is a 1996 video game developed by Blue Byte.

== Development ==
The development of the game started in February 1996. The game was developed by 14 people.

== Reception ==
Reception

Review scores
Publication	Score
AllGame	2/5
CNET Gamecenter	7/10
Computer Games Strategy Plus	4/5
Computer Gaming World	4.5/5
Computer and Video Games	4/5
Edge	7/10
EP Daily	8.5/10
GameSpot	8.2/10
Next Generation	2/5
PC Gamer (US)	68%

Extreme Assault received mostly positive reviews. Most critics remarked that the game features stunning graphics even without the use of graphics acceleration cards, and approved of the use of lowbrow, accessible gameplay more commonly associated with console games than PC games. Next Generation disagreed on both points, contending that the graphics only look good if the optional 3dfx card is used, and that the simplistic gameplay and limited story will quickly bore the player. GamePro defended the game with the claim: "While it may be a little short on plot, Extreme Assault has something for every gamer..." (Note: GamePro gave the game 4.5/5 for graphics, sound, control, and fun factor.)

GamePro and The Electric Playground both also said the controls are easy to handle even when using just a keyboard. The Electric Playground's reviewer also lauded the difficulty curve, saying that "I found myself constantly and fairly challenged throughout the game". In contrast, GameSpot complained that the game's difficulty is "brutal", and criticized the fact that easy mode only allows one to play a portion of the game.
