= B.A.T. II – The Koshan Conspiracy =

1992 video game

- Developer: Computer's Dream
- Publisher: Ubi Soft
- Platforms: Amiga, Atari ST, MS-DOS
- Release: 1992 (Amiga, DOS); 1993 (Atari ST)
- Genre: Adventure game
- Mode: Single-player

B.A.T. II – The Koshan Conspiracy is a futuristic point and click adventure game written by Computer's Dream and published by Ubi Soft in 1992. It is the sequel to the 1990 game B.A.T.

The Koshan Conspiracy is a futuristic adventure game. The player starts in the city of Roma II on the planet Shedishan, but is quickly given the freedom to explore as they like. The player explores Roma II, talks to non-player characters, solves puzzles, travels to new cities by use of a mini-game, buys weapons and ammo, engages in fire fights (also by way of a mini-game), acquires a spaceship, and enters space. The player can even program a wrist computer (B.O.B) in the game to perform different functions. It has an open, non-linear play style.

The Amiga and Atari ST versions shipped with a physical dongle to prevent piracy.

The box art was painted by Luis Royo.

== Reception ==
Computer Gaming World stated that Koshan "was clearly a superior product" to its predecessor, with a much larger game world and both strategic and action combat options. The magazine concluded that it was "an enormous game, offering a richly textured, futuristic gameworld that gamers can find themselves easily drawn into".

Peter Olafson of Amiga World wrote that the tasks the game gave the player were "pleasantly sophisticated and grown-up", and praised the variety of things to explore and accomplish on Shedishan. He was unhappy that the Amiga version had some technical optimization issues and seemed inferior graphically to the IBM version in parts, though.
