= QuickStart =

QuickStart is a loading method used by several different software applications, designed to speed up the loading time of their software. Some load the core files and libraries during computer startup and allow the applications to start more quickly when selected later. QuickStarters typically place an icon in the System Tray. When the full application needs to be loaded, the base components are already in RAM, which significantly reduces load time.

QuickStarters are controversial because they use up RAM even when the application is not open. For this reason, QuickStarters can actually decrease performance as a whole. For example, if six applications load a QuickStarter into the System Tray at 50 megabytes per piece, that is 300 megabytes of RAM that could otherwise be used for working applications. If the user only has 256 megabytes of RAM, this will cause running applications to page to virtual memory and drastically reduce performance. On the other hand, if the user has one gigabyte of RAM, running applications will probably not be paged, and load times for QuickStart applications will be reduced (resulting in higher overall performance). The point from where the user powers on the system and when the system is ready for use will be delayed, as the system must incur a performance penalty in the form of reading the QuickStart applications from the hard drive and additional CPU processing and sub-system usage as the QuickStart application is loaded into memory.

The following are examples of applications which use the QuickStart method:

- Adobe Acrobat, Adobe Reader and Acrobat 3D, though these do not load the programs into memory (since version 7.0) (reader_sl.exe, adobearm.exe)
- Java Runtime (jqs.exe)
- The Microsoft Office Suite (OSA.exe)
- The OpenOffice.org Suite
- Apple QuickTime and iTunes (QTTask.exe, iTunesHelper.exe)
- Winamp Music Player

QuickStarters are a workaround for the poor performance of hard disk drives (HDDs) which have traditionally been the standard for desktop computers. Solid-state drives (SSDs) have lower latency and faster seek times than HDDs, so there is less need for QuickStarters on SSDs. SSD are slowly becoming more popular on certain types of computers.

== In a business setting ==
In a business setting, a quickstart can also be an informal, often short description of how to accomplish some specific task. It is generally meant to help non-experts, leave out details that are only important to experts, and may also be greatly simplified from an overall discussion of the topic.

== See also ==
- Prefetcher from Windows XP
- SuperFetch from Windows Vista
