= Rush (video games) =

Video gaming strategy of making an early attack

In real-time strategy (RTS) video games, a rush is an opening strategy in which a player commits to an attack during the early stages of a match, before an opponent has established a developed economy, technology base, or defensive position. Rushes rely on speed, surprise, and a build order that prioritizes immediate military pressure. They may employ inexpensive combat units, worker units, or offensive structures placed near an opponent's base. Because the attacker diverts resources away from longer-term development, containing the attack can leave the rushing player at a disadvantage. The tactic became particularly associated with the Zerg faction in StarCraft, giving rise to the term Zerg rush.

== Strategy ==
Strategic decision-making in RTS games includes choosing how much to invest in economic development, technology, and the production of combat units. Santiago Ontañón and his co-authors define rushing as rapidly constructing an army and sending it to attack as early as possible. Ben Weber and Michael Mateas similarly classify rushing as a build-order strategy intended to overwhelm an opponent with inexpensive units early in a match. They distinguish it from a timing attack, which is launched after a particular trigger, such as completing an upgrade.

Rushes are therefore defined principally by the timing and commitment of the attack rather than by one fixed unit composition. An analysis of StarCraft II identified three common forms: a gate rush, in which a Protoss player rapidly produces combat units; a cannon rush, in which offensive structures are constructed close to the opposing base; and a Zerg rush, using early groups of Zerglings or Banelings. Worker rushes similarly use resource-gathering units as an unexpectedly early attacking force.

Roland Li similarly characterizes rushing as a high-risk trade-off: resources committed to an early attack are unavailable for research, defences, or stronger units, and failure can therefore leave the attacker behind. Scouting can reveal the attacker's production buildings or unit choices and allow an opponent to construct an appropriate defence. A rush may attempt to win immediately or merely damage workers and production sufficiently to establish an economic advantage. Some rushes are effectively all-in strategies: PC Gamer described the Zergling rush as an aggressive commitment whose failure may leave the attacker without sufficient resources to resist more advanced units.

== History and multiplayer culture ==
Early rush strategies predated StarCraft. Dor describes players using early groups of Orc grunts in Warcraft II: Tides of Darkness, while the Soviet tank rush in Command & Conquer: Red Alert became notorious as a dominant strategy that was difficult to counter without using the same tactic.

The prevalence of early attacks also produced informal “no rush” rules in multiplayer communities. Games advertised on Battle.net sometimes prohibited rushing for a specified number of minutes, allowing players to develop their bases before combat began. Similar negotiated rules appeared among players of Age of Empires II, while Rise of Nations incorporated an equivalent restriction into its skirmish settings. Novice ladder maps in StarCraft II briefly used destructible obstacles to delay access to opposing bases and limit early rushes. Dor interprets these conventions as examples of players modifying a game's effective rules through community practice and its metagame.

== Zerg rush ==
A massed Zerg attack on a Terran base in StarCraft II, illustrating a “Zerg rush” by overwhelming an opponent with large numbers of inexpensive units.

Rush tactics became particularly associated with the Zerg in the StarCraft series, as it reflects the faction's presentation as a swarm composed of individually weaker creatures that attack collectively. In earlier versions of the 1998 video game StarCraft, a Zerg player could initially produce six Zerglings before a Terran or Protoss player could field an equivalent force, allowing the player to deploy Zerglings to harass worker units and buildings during the opening minutes of a game. A subsequent patch 1.08b, released on May 20, 2001, introduced various updates and balance changes to the game. It increased the cost of a building called the Spawning Pool, which delays Zergling production and reduces this early advantage.

The “Zerg rush” subsequently became a broader term for attacks based on quickly overwhelming an opponent with numerous inexpensive units. Video game scholars have discussed the Zerg rush in relation to the connection between faction design, player-developed strategies, software patches, and competitive balance. Game design literature has used the Zerg rush as an example of a potentially dominant strategy that remains counterable by skilled and prepared players, rather than guaranteeing victory by itself.

The expression later received recognition outside StarCraft. In April 2012, Google introduced an interactive Easter egg triggered by searching for “Zerg rush”, in which letter O characters attacked the displayed search results while users attempted to destroy them by clicking.

== See also ==
- Turtling (gameplay)
