= Kiko World Football =

1998 sports video game

- Developer(s): Ubi Soft
- Publisher(s): Ubi Soft
- Platform(s): MS-DOS, Windows
- Release: 1998
- Genre(s): Sports
- Mode(s): Single-player, multiplayer

Kiko World Football (also known as Puma World Football and World Football 98) is a football simulation game developed and published by Ubi Soft for the PC. It was released in 1998, just before 1998 FIFA World Cup. It was an ad-game, as in the break between halves an advertisement was shown.

Other names for the game when distributed as budget label were World Football, Sean Dundee's World Club Football and Kiko World Football '98.

The game was later distributed as a gift when buying Danone yogurts under the name of Danone World Football.
