= Pro Tennis Tour =

1989 video game

- Developers: Blue Byte; ESP (C64)
- Publisher: Ubi Soft
- Platforms: Amiga, Atari ST, MS-DOS, Amstrad CPC, Commodore 64, ZX Spectrum
- Release: 1989
- Genre: Sports
- Modes: Single-player, multiplayer

Pro Tennis Tour (known in Germany and France as Great Courts) is a 1989 sports video game developed by Blue Byte and published by Ubi Soft for the Amiga, Atari ST and MS-DOS. 8-bit ports for the Amstrad CPC, Commodore 64, and ZX Spectrum were released later. Electronic Arts distributed the game in North America. A sequel, Pro Tennis Tour 2, was released in 1991.

== Gameplay ==
The game offers a pseudo three-dimensional view of the court. The joystick or keyboard controls the movement. Shots are played by pressing the fire button and releasing it to hit the ball. Positioning is important, since the player character can't be moved while swinging. A crosshair appears on the ground when the opponent hits the ball, to mark where to hit the ball. The crosshair can be switched off in higher difficulties. Tournament play is the main part of the game. The player begins ranked 64th and plays computer-controlled opponents in succession. Tournaments have different surfaces: grass at Wimbledon, clay at the French Open, cement at the Australian Open and the US Open. In practice mode, skills can be worked on against computer-controlled opponents or the ball machine. In two-player mode, the foreground views are alternated between the players after a round is over.

== Reception ==
Reception

Review scores
Publication	Score
ACE	900/1000 (Amiga); 850/1000 (DOS)
Aktueller Software Markt	41/60 (Amiga)
Your Sinclair	85% (ZX)
Zzap!64	88% (Amiga); 82% (C64)
Amstar Informatique	16/20 (CPC)
The One	83% (ST)

ACE said "What really makes this particular tennis simulation stand out is attention to detail." and "This is easily the best tennis simulation to date [...]" Zzap!64 noted that "[t]he difficulty of hitting the ball is disconcerting at first, but once mastered the novel hitting technique works really well." The game was summarized as "[u]ndoubtedly the best tennis sim yet." Zzap!64 also reviewed the Commodore 64 port: "This is a really good conversion [...], retaining the Amiga game's simple playability and featuring some very good, large player sprites. The game plays almost identically to the original with a high speed of play that makes hitting the ball a difficult task at first." Amiga World concluded: "While its graphics are gorgeous and the sound very life-like, Pro Tennis Tour is below the usual quality of the Electronic Arts sports line. Sit out this match." Amstar Informatique called the game "a must have". Your Sinclair called the game "The best tennis sim on the Speccy so far."
