= Ro-100-class submarine =

Submarine class

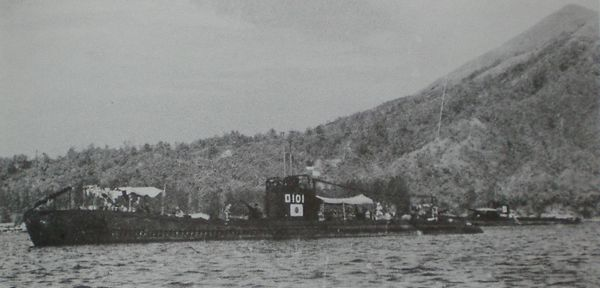
- Ro-101 in 1943

Class overview
- Name: Ro-100-class submarine
- Builders: Kure Naval Arsenal; Kawasaki Shipbuilding
- Operators: Imperial Japanese Navy
- Built: 1941–44
- In commission: 1942–45
- Planned: 18
- Completed: 18
- Lost: 18

General characteristics
- Type: Submarine
- Displacement: 611 tonnes (601 long tons) surfaced; 795 tonnes (782 long tons) submerged
- Length: 60.90 m (199 ft 10 in) overall
- Beam: 6.00 m (19 ft 8 in)
- Draft: 3.51 m (11 ft 6 in)
- Installed power: 1,000 bhp (750 kW) (diesel); 760 hp (570 kW) (electric motor)
- Propulsion: Diesel-electric; 2 × diesel engines; 2 × electric motors; 2 x shafts
- Speed: 14.2 knots (26.3 km/h; 16.3 mph) surfaced; 8 knots (15 km/h; 9.2 mph) submerged
- Range: 3,500 nmi (6,500 km; 4,000 mi) at 12 knots (22 km/h; 14 mph) surfaced; 60 nmi (110 km; 69 mi) at 3 knots (5.6 km/h; 3.5 mph) submerged
- Test depth: 75 m (246 ft)
- Crew: 38
- Armament: 4 × bow 533 mm (21 in) torpedo tubes; 2 × 25 mm (1 in) Type 96 anti-aircraft guns or 1 × 76.2 mm (3.00 in) L/40 AA gun

The Ro-100-class submarine (呂百型潜水艦, Ro-hyaku-gata Sensuikan) was a group of medium-sized coastal submarines built for the Imperial Japanese Navy (IJN) during World War II. The IJN official designation for this class was Ko type submarine (小型潜水艦, Ko-gata Sensuikan, "Small type Submarine") or Senshō type submarine (潜小型潜水艦, Sen-Shō-gata sensuikan, "Submarine-Small Type"). They are also known as Type KS submarine. The type name was shortened to Sensuikan Ko-gata (潜水艦小型, Submarine-Small Type).

== Design and description ==
In 1940, the IJN designed a point-defence coastal submarine because they wanted to save their larger submarines for fleet battles. The Ro-100 class was derived from the preceding Kaichū type. They displaced 611 tonnes (601 long tons) surfaced and 795 tonnes (782 long tons) submerged. The submarines were 60.9 meters (199 ft 10 in) long, had a beam of 6 meters (19 ft 8 in) and a draft of 3.51 meters (11 ft 6 in). They had a double hull and a diving depth of 75 meters (246 ft).

For surface running, the boats were powered by two 500-brake-horsepower (373 kW) diesel engines, each driving one propeller shaft. When submerged each propeller was driven by a 380-horsepower (283 kW) electric motor. They could reach 14.2 knots (26.3 km/h; 16.3 mph) on the surface and 8 knots (15 km/h; 9.2 mph) underwater. On the surface, the Ro-100s had a range of 3,500 nautical miles (6,500 km; 4,000 mi) at 12 knots (22 km/h; 14 mph); submerged, they had a range of 60 nmi (110 km; 69 mi) at 3 knots (5.6 km/h; 3.5 mph).

The boats were armed with four internal bow 53.3 cm (21.0 in) torpedo tubes and carried a total of eight torpedoes. They were also armed with two single mounts for 25 mm (1 in) Type 96 anti-aircraft guns or a single 76.2 mm (3.00 in) L/40 AA gun.

== Boats ==
18 boats were built in 1941-1944 under the Maru Rin Programme (Boat #210-218) and the Maru Kyū Programme (Boat #400-408).

Boat #	Name	Builder	Laid down	Launched	Completed	Results	Fate
210	Ro-100	Kure Naval Arsenal	1941-06-30	1941-06-12	1942-08-23		Sunk by naval mine off Bougainville Island 1943-11-25.
211	Ro-101	Kawasaki-Kōbe Shipyard	1941-09-30	1942-04-17	1942-10-31		Sunk by USS Saufley and PBY southeast of San Cristobal 1943-09-15.
212	Ro-102	Kawasaki-Kōbe Shipyard	1941-09-30	1942-04-17	1942-11-17		Disappeared south of Rabi after 1943-05-09.
213	Ro-103	Kure Naval Arsenal	1941-06-30	1941-12-06	1942-10-21	Sank USS Aludra 1943-06-23; Sank USS Deimos 1943-06-23	Disappeared in the Solomon Islands after 1943-07-28, possibly sunk by a mine or a PT boat.
214	Ro-104	Kawasaki-Kōbe Shipyard	1941-11-19	1942-07-11	1943-02-25		Sunk by USS England north of the Admiralty Islands 1944-05-23.
215	Ro-105	Kawasaki-Kōbe Shipyard	1941-11-19	1942-07-11	1943-03-05		Sunk by USS England north of the Admiralty Islands 1944-05-31.
216	Ro-106	Kure Naval Arsenal	1941-12-17	1942-05-30	1942-12-26	Sank USS LST-342 1943-07-11	Sunk by USS England north of the Admiralty Islands 1944-05-22.
217	Ro-107	Kure Naval Arsenal	1941-12-17	1942-05-30	1942-12-26		Sunk by USS Taylor east of Kolombangara 1943-07-21.
218	Ro-108	Kawasaki-Kōbe Shipyard	1942-04-20	1942-10-26	1943-04-20	Sank USS Henley 1943-10-03	Sunk by USS England north of the Admiralty Islands 1944-05-26.
400	Ro-109	Kawasaki-Kōbe Shipyard	1942-04-20	1942-10-26	1943-04-29		Sunk by USS Horace A. Bass south of Okinawa Island 1945-04-25.
401	Ro-110	Kawasaki-Kōbe Shipyard	1942-08-20	1943-01-26	1943-07-06		Sunk by HMAS Launceston, HMAS Ipswich and HMIS Jumna in the Bay of Bengal 1944-02-12.
402	Ro-111	Kawasaki-Kōbe Shipyard	1942-08-20	1943-01-26	1943-07-10	Sank RMS Peshawar 1943-12-23	Sunk by USS Taylor north of the Admiralty Islands 1944-06-10.
403	Ro-112	Kawasaki-Senshū Shipyard	1942-06-20	1943-03-25	1943-09-14		Sunk by USS Batfish in the Luzon Strait 1945-02-11.
404	Ro-113	Kawasaki-Senshū Shipyard	1942-07-11	1943-04-24	1943-10-12		Sunk by USS Batfish in the Luzon Strait 1945-02-12.
405	Ro-114	Kawasaki-Senshū Shipyard	1942-10-12	1943-06-19	1943-11-20		Sunk by USS Melvin and USS Wadleigh east of Saipan 1944-06-17.
406	Ro-115	Kawasaki-Senshū Shipyard	1942-10-12	1943-06-19	1943-11-30		Sunk by USS Jenkins, USS O'Bannon and USS Bell west of Mindoro 1945-02-01. Holmes contradicts the identification, indicating that Ro-115 acknowledged orders to proceed to Manila two days after the supposed date of its sinking, and was more likely to have been sunk by USS Batfish on 1945-02-10.
407	Ro-116	Kawasaki-Senshū Shipyard	1943-01-16	1943-09-13	1944-01-21		Sunk by USS England north of the Admiralty Islands 1944-05-24.
408	Ro-117	Kawasaki-Senshū Shipyard	1943-01-16	1943-09-13	1944-01-31		Sunk by USN patrol bomber southeast of Saipan 1944-05-24.

== Bibliography ==
- Bagnasco, Erminio (1977). Submarines of World War Two. Annapolis, Maryland: Naval Institute Press. ISBN 0-87021-962-6.
- Carpenter, Dorr B. & Polmar, Norman (1986). Submarines of the Imperial Japanese Navy 1904–1945. London: Conway Maritime Press. ISBN 0-85177-396-6.
- Chesneau, Roger, ed. (1980). Conway's All the World's Fighting Ships 1922–1946. Greenwich, UK: Conway Maritime Press. ISBN 0-85177-146-7.
- "Rekishi Gunzō"., History of Pacific War Vol.17 I-Gō Submarines, Gakken (Japan), January 1998, ISBN 4-05-601767-0
- Rekishi Gunzō, History of Pacific War Extra, "Perfect guide, The submarines of the Imperial Japanese Forces", Gakken (Japan), March 2005, ISBN 4-05-603890-2
- The Maru Special, Japanese Naval Vessels No.43 Japanese Submarines III, Ushio Shobō (Japan), September 1980, Book code 68343-43
- The Maru Special, Japanese Naval Vessels No.132 Japanese Submarines I "Revised edition", Ushio Shobō (Japan), February 1988, Book code 68344-36
