= Blanche Channel =

Channel in Solomon Islands

Coordinates: 8.578°S 157.54°E

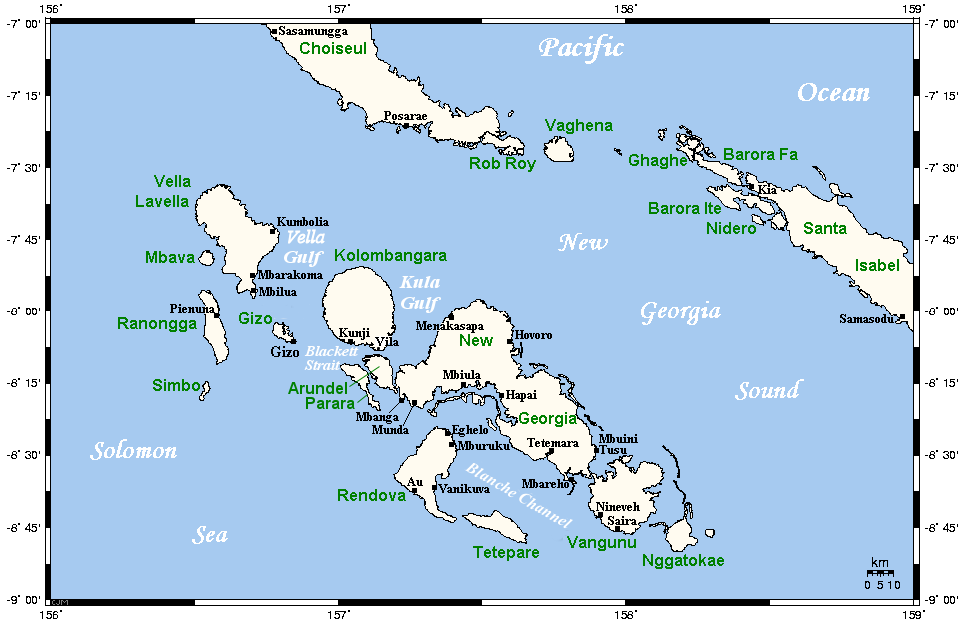
Blanche Channel, separating large + irregular New Georgia Island from smaller islands to its south.

Blanche Channel is a strait and waterway in the Western Province of the Solomon Islands.

It lies between New Georgia Island and Vangunu island on the northeast, and Rendova Island and Tetepare Island on the southwest. The channel opens to the Solomon Sea at both its east and west ends.

On 18 July 1943, the Japanese submarine Ro-106 torpedoed the United States Navy tank landing ship USS LST-342 in the Blanche Channel off New Georgia.

== See also ==
- Straits of the Solomon Islands
