= Japanese submarine Ro-116 =

History

Japan
- Name: Submarine No. 407
- Builder: Kawasaki, Senshu and Kobe, Japan
- Laid down: 16 January 1943
- Renamed: Ro-116 on 5 July 1943
- Launched: 13 September 1943
- Completed: 21 January 1944
- Commissioned: 21 January 1944
- Fate: Sunk 24 May 1944
- Stricken: 10 August 1944

General characteristics
- Class & type: Ro-100-class submarine
- Displacement: 611 tonnes (601 long tons) surfaced; 795 tonnes (782 long tons) submerged
- Length: 60.90 m (199 ft 10 in) overall
- Beam: 6.00 m (19 ft 8 in)
- Draft: 3.51 m (11 ft 6 in)
- Installed power: 1,000 bhp (750 kW) (diesel); 760 hp (570 kW) (electric motor)
- Propulsion: Diesel-electric; 1 × diesel engine; 1 × electric motor
- Speed: 14.2 knots (26.3 km/h; 16.3 mph) surfaced; 8 knots (15 km/h; 9.2 mph) submerged
- Range: 3,500 nmi (6,500 km; 4,000 mi) at 12 knots (22 km/h; 14 mph) surfaced; 60 nmi (110 km; 69 mi) at 3 knots (5.6 km/h; 3.5 mph) submerged
- Test depth: 75 m (246 ft)
- Crew: 38
- Armament: 4 × bow 533 mm (21 in) torpedo tubes; 2 × 25 mm (1 in) Type 96 anti-aircraft guns or 1 × 76.2 mm (3.00 in) L/40 AA gun

Ro-116 was an Imperial Japanese Navy Ro-100-class submarine. Completed and commissioned in January 1944, she served in World War II and was sunk in May 1944 during her second war patrol.

== Design and description ==
The Ro-100 class was a medium-sized, coastal submarine derived from the preceding Kaichū type. They displaced 611 tonnes (601 long tons) surfaced and 795 tonnes (782 long tons) submerged. The submarines were 60.9 meters (199 ft 10 in) long, had a beam of 6 meters (19 ft 8 in) and a draft of 3.51 meters (11 ft 6 in). They had a double hull and a diving depth of 75 meters (246 ft).

For surface running, the boats were powered by two 500-brake-horsepower (373 kW) diesel engines, each driving one propeller shaft. When submerged each propeller was driven by a 380-horsepower (283 kW) electric motor. They could reach 14.2 knots (26.3 km/h; 16.3 mph) on the surface and 8 knots (15 km/h; 9.2 mph) underwater. On the surface, the Ro-100s had a range of 3,500 nautical miles (6,500 km; 4,000 mi) at 12 knots (22 km/h; 14 mph); submerged, they had a range of 60 nmi (110 km; 69 mi) at 3 knots (5.6 km/h; 3.5 mph).

The boats were armed with four internal bow 53.3 cm (21.0 in) torpedo tubes and carried a total of eight torpedoes. They were also armed with two single mounts for 25 mm (1 in) Type 96 anti-aircraft guns or a single 76.2 mm (3.00 in) L/40 AA gun.

== Construction and commissioning ==
Ro-116 was laid down as Submarine No. 407 on 16 January 1943 by Kawasaki at Senshu, Japan. She was renamed Ro-116 on 5 July 1943 and was attached provisionally to the Yokosuka Naval District that day. She was launched on 13 September 1943, then was towed to Kawasaki's shipyard at Kobe, Japan, for fitting-out. She was completed and commissioned at Kobe on 21 January 1944.

== Service history ==
=== January–March 1944 ===
Upon commissioning, Ro-116 was attached formally to the Yokosuka Naval District and was assigned to Submarine Squadron 11 for workups. She called at the 3rd Fuel Depot at Tokuyama, Japan, from 28 to 29 March 1944 to refuel.

=== First war patrol ===
Ro-116 got underway from Japan on 31 March 1944 along with the submarine Ro-117 for her first war patrol, ordered to intercept an Allied task force operating in the vicinity of the Palau Islands. She did not find the task force, and returned to Japan on 13 April 1944.

=== Second war patrol ===
On 4 May 1944, Ro-116 was reassigned to Submarine Division 51 in Submarine Squadron 7 in the 6th Fleet. She departed Kure, Japan, that day bound for Saipan in the Mariana Islands, which she reached on 10 May 1944.

Ro-116 got underway from Saipan on 15 May 1944 for her second war patrol with orders to join the submarines Ro-104, Ro-105, Ro-106, Ro-108, Ro-109, and Ro-112 in forming a submarine picket line north of the Admiralty Islands designated Scouting Line NA. The picket line was tasked with providing warning of any move toward the Palau Islands by Allied invasion forces.

On 18 May 1944, U.S. Navy signals intelligence personnel intercepted and decrypted Japanese signals indicating the formation of Scouting Line NA between Truk and the Admiralties. A hunter-killer group composed of the destroyer escorts USS England (DE-635), USS George (DE-697), and USS Raby (DE-698) departed Purvis Bay in the Solomon Islands to intercept the submarine I-16, then attack the submarines assigned to Scouting Line NA. After England sank I-16 on 19 May 1944, the hunter-killer group turned its attention to Scouting Line NA and had its first successes against the line when England sank Ro-106 on 22 May 1944 and Ro-104 on 23 May 1944.

=== Loss ===
At 01:20 Lima Time on 24 May 1944, Ro-116 was on the surface 225 nautical miles (417 km; 259 mi) north-northwest of Kavieng on New Ireland when George gained radar contact on her at a range of 17,000 yards (15,500 m). Ro-116 submerged at 01:28, causing George to lose contact. At 01:50, however, England made sonar contact on Ro-116 at a range of 750 yards (690 m). Operating at a depth of 170 feet (52 m), Ro-116 began to emit sound impulses to jam England′s sonar and to make violent evasive maneuvers intended to disrupt England′s sonar by creating underwater wakes. England aborted her first two attack runs, then fired a barrage of 24 Hedgehog projectiles, at least three of which hit and sank Ro-116 at 00°53′N 149°14′E. After sunrise, debris was recovered from the ocean's surface in the area.

Ro-116 was the fourth of six Japanese submarines England sank over a 13-day period in May 1944: She previously had sunk I-16 on 19 May Ro-106 on 22 May, and Ro-104 on 23 May, she went on to sink Ro-108 on 26 May, and Ro-105 on 31 May.

On 25 June 1944, the Imperial Japanese Navy declared Ro-116 to be presumed lost north of the Admiralty Islands with all 56 men on board. The Japanese struck her from the Navy list on 10 August 1944.
