= Japanese submarine Ro-105 =

History

Japan
- Name: Submarine No. 215
- Builder: Kawasaki, Kobe, Japan
- Laid down: 19 November 1941
- Renamed: Ro-105
- Launched: 11 July 1942
- Completed: 5 March 1943
- Commissioned: 5 March 1943
- Fate: Sunk 31 May 1944
- Stricken: 10 August 1944

General characteristics
- Class & type: Ro-100-class submarine
- Displacement: 611 tonnes (601 long tons) surfaced; 795 tonnes (782 long tons) submerged
- Length: 60.90 m (199 ft 10 in) overall
- Beam: 6.00 m (19 ft 8 in)
- Draft: 3.51 m (11 ft 6 in)
- Installed power: 1,000 bhp (750 kW) (diesel); 760 hp (570 kW) (electric motor)
- Propulsion: Diesel-electric; 1 × diesel engine; 1 × electric motor
- Speed: 14.2 knots (26.3 km/h; 16.3 mph) surfaced; 8 knots (15 km/h; 9.2 mph) submerged
- Range: 3,500 nmi (6,500 km; 4,000 mi) at 12 knots (22 km/h; 14 mph) surfaced; 60 nmi (110 km; 69 mi) at 3 knots (5.6 km/h; 3.5 mph) submerged
- Test depth: 75 m (246 ft)
- Crew: 38
- Armament: 4 × bow 533 mm (21 in) torpedo tubes; 2 × 25 mm (1 in) Type 96 anti-aircraft guns or 1 × 76.2 mm (3.00 in) L/40 AA gun

Ro-105 was an Imperial Japanese Navy Ro-100-class submarine. Completed and commissioned in March 1943, she served in World War II, operating in the Aleutian Islands campaign, New Guinea campaign, and Solomon Islands campaign and in the vicinity of Truk, Rabaul, and the Admiralty Islands before she was sunk in May 1944 during her fourth war patrol.

== Design and description ==
The Ro-100 class was a medium-sized, coastal submarine derived from the preceding Kaichū type. They displaced 611 tonnes (601 long tons) surfaced and 795 tonnes (782 long tons) submerged. The submarines were 60.9 meters (199 ft 10 in) long, had a beam of 6 meters (19 ft 8 in) and a draft of 3.51 meters (11 ft 6 in). They had a double hull and a diving depth of 75 meters (246 ft).

For surface running, the boats were powered by two 500-brake-horsepower (373 kW) diesel engines, each driving one propeller shaft. When submerged each propeller was driven by a 380-horsepower (283 kW) electric motor. They could reach 14.2 knots (26.3 km/h; 16.3 mph) on the surface and 8 knots (15 km/h; 9.2 mph) underwater. On the surface, the Ro-100s had a range of 3,500 nautical miles (6,500 km; 4,000 mi) at 12 knots (22 km/h; 14 mph); submerged, they had a range of 60 nmi (110 km; 69 mi) at 3 knots (5.6 km/h; 3.5 mph).

The boats were armed with four internal bow 53.3 cm (21.0 in) torpedo tubes and carried a total of eight torpedoes. They were also armed with two single mounts for 25 mm (1 in) Type 96 anti-aircraft guns or a single 76.2 mm (3.00 in) L/40 AA gun.

== Construction and commissioning ==
Ro-105 was laid down as Submarine No. 215 on 19 November 1941 by Kawasaki at Kobe, Japan. She had been renamed Ro-105 by the time she was launched on 11 July 1942. She was completed and commissioned on 5 March 1943.

== Service history ==
=== March–June 1943 ===
Upon commissioning, Ro-105 was attached to the Kure Naval District and was assigned to the Kure Submarine Squadron. She participated in torpedo practice with the submarines I-37, I-38, and Ro-104 on 26 March 1943. She was reassigned to Submarine Squadron 11 on 1 April 1943 for workups and then to Submarine Squadron 7 on 11 June 1943.

=== Aleutian Islands campaign ===
On the day Ro-105 was assigned to Submarine Squadron 7, she was detailed to Submarine Squadron 1 for service in the Aleutian Islands, where the Aleutian Islands campaign was in its final stages. The Battle of Attu of 11–30 May 1943 had ended in U.S. forces retaking Attu and annihilating its Japanese garrison, and on 21 May 1943 — even before the battle ended — Japanese Imperial General Headquarters had decided to evacuate the isolated Japanese garrison on Kiska. In operations with Submarine Squadron 1, Ro-105 and her sister ship Ro-104 — which had been detailed to the squadron on 5 June 1943 — were to support the evacuation. Ro-105 departed Kure on 16 June 1943 bound for Paramushiro in the Kurile Islands, which she reached on 21 June 1943.

==== First war patrol ====
Ro-105 got underway from Paramushiro on 28 June 1943 for her first war patrol, assigned to operate with the Northern Submarine Patrol Unit. From 3 to 9 July 1943 she operated as a unit of Patrol Line A, patrolling in the Bering Sea northwest of Kiska to support the evacuation of the garrison. After an uneventful patrol, she returned to Paramushiro on 12 July 1943. Reassigned to Submarine Squadron 7 on 16 July 1943, she left the same day for Yokosuka, Japan, where she arrived on 22 July 1943 and began repairs and an overhaul.

=== Voyage to Rabaul ===
With her overhaul complete, Ro-105 departed Yokosuka on 11 August 1943 bound for Rabaul on New Britain. While she was making 13 to 14 knots (24 to 26 km/h; 15 to 16 mph) on the surface northwest of Marcus Island on 12 August 1943, the submerged United States Navy submarine USS Tarpon (SS-175) sighted her at 17:27 Kilo Time. Observing Ro-105 through Tarpon′s periscope, Tarpon′s commanding officer described her as an "I-153-class submarine" with the Japanese "merchant ship flag" and "D-105" painted on her conning tower. After a submerged approach, Tarpon fired two Mark 14 Mod 3A torpedoes from her stern torpedo tubes at Ro-105 at 18:01. Ro-105′s lookouts apparently sighted the torpedo wakes, because Ro-105 made a sharp turn toward Tarpon and the torpedoes missed. Ro-105 passed close to Tarpon, increased speed, began to zigzag, and escaped the encounter without damage.

While at sea, Ro-105 was reassigned to Submarine Division 51 on 20 August 1943. She reached Rabaul on 23 August 1943.

=== Operations from Rabaul ===
==== Second war patrol ====
Ro-105 departed Rabaul on 2 September 1943 to begin her second war patrol, assigned a patrol area in the southeastern Solomon Islands south of San Cristobal. On 24 September 1943 she rescued several Imperial Japanese Navy Air Service pilots who had been shot down on 22 September 1943. On 25 September 1943, she joined the submarine Ro-109 and eleven destroyers in covering the evacuation of Japanese forces from Kolombangara in the central Solomons. One of the submarines fired torpedoes at the U.S. Navy light cruiser USS Columbia (CL-56), but missed. Ro-105 concluded her patrol with her return to Rabaul later on 25 September 1943.

==== October 1943 ====
On 7 October 1943, Ro-105 departed Rabaul to carry supplies to Sarmi on the northern coast of New Guinea in support of Japanese forces fighting in the New Guinea campaign. She reached Sarmi on 9 October 1943, unloaded her cargo, and got back underway the same night for the return voyage. She arrived at Rabaul on 11 October 1943.

On 12 October 1943, the United States Army Air Forces Fifth Air Force and the Royal Australian Air Force combined to stage the largest Allied air raid of the Pacific War up to that time, with 349 aircraft based in New Guinea and Australia hitting Japanese airfields around Rabaul and shipping in Simpson Harbour at Rabaul. Ro-105 and the submarines I-36, I-38, I-176, I-177, and Ro-108 were in the harbor during the air raid and most of them submerged to avoid attack. Ro-105 suffered minor damage from near-misses by bombs.

Ro-105 put to sea from Rabaul on 14 October 1943 for another supply voyage to Sarmi. She called at Sarmi on 16 October 1943, unloaded her cargo, and headed back to Rabaul, which she reached on 18 October 1943. She got underway again on 22 October 1943 with orders to intercept and attack an Allied task force, but found no targets and returned to Rabaul on 24 October 1943.

==== Third war patrol ====
On 27 October 1943, Ro-105 began her third war patrol, departing Rabaul bound for a patrol area off Mono Island in the Treasury Islands. On 1 November 1943, the Bougainville campaign began with U.S. landings at Cape Torokina on Bougainville, and a Japanese attempt to bring reinforcements to Bougainville resulted in the Battle of Empress Augusta Bay on 2 November 1943. Ro-105′s lookouts observed star shells and gun flashes from the battle in the distance early in the morning of 2 November. The Japanese light cruiser Sendai and destroyer Hatsukaze were sunk during the battle, and later on 2 November 1943 Ro-105 received orders to search for their survivors. She found bodies in the water but no living Japanese, although she did rescue two downed Japanese naval aviators from a life raft southeast of New Britain on 6 November 1943. She arrived at Rabaul on 9 November 1943.

==== November 1943–February 1944 ====
Ro-105 departed Rabaul on 17 November 1943 for her third supply run to Sarmi. She arrived there on 18 November 1943, unloaded her cargo, and then put back to sea to patrol off New Britain in the Arawe-Cape Merkus area. She returned to Rabaul on 23 November 1943. She got underway for Sarmi again on 6 December 1943, carrying a cargo of 7 metric tons of ammunition, provisions, stores, and medicine for the Imperial Japanese Army forces on New Guinea, and 4 metric tons of cargo in rubber bags on deck for Navy forces on the island. When she arrived at Sarmi on 8 December 1943, she could not unload due a breakdown in communications with Japanese forces ashore and withdrew. On 10 December 1943, she made a second try, and succeeded in delivering her cargo. Leaving Sarmi the same day, she again patrolled in the Arawe-Cape Merkus area before returning to Rabaul on 20 December 1943.

On 30 December 1943, Ro-105 got underway from Rabaul to rescue crews of Imperial Japanese Army Air Force Nakajima Ki-43 (Allied reporting name "Oscar") fighters and Nakajima Ki-49 (Allied reporting name "Helen") bombers who had been shot down on 26 December 1943. While at sea on 1 January 1944, she received orders to intercept U.S. Navy Task Force 74, which a Japanese patrol plane reported north of Choiseul. When she found no U.S. ships, she joined the submarine I-181 on lifeguard duty for downed Japanese pilots. She returned to Rabaul on 8 January 1944.

Three more supply runs from Rabaul to Sarmi followed. For her fifth voyage there, Ro-105 departed Rabaul on 16 January 1944, called at Sarmi on 18 January, and returned to Rabaul on 20 January 1944. She began her sixth run on 26 January, unloaded at Sarmi on 28 January, and headed back to Rabaul, which she reached on 30 January 1944. For her seventh and final run, she got underway from Rabaul on 12 February 1944, discharged her cargo at Sarmi on 14 February 1944, and returned to Rabaul on 17 February 1944.

=== February–May 1944 ===
Upon arrival at Rabaul, Ro-105 was reassigned to the 1st Advance Submarine Unit. She departed Rabaul on 20 February 1944 and patrolled off Truk. She called at Truk from 7 or 8 March to 13 March, then set course for Japan, where she arrived at Sasebo on 25 March 1944 and began repairs and an overhaul. With the work complete, she departed Sasebo on 7 May 1944 and proceeded to Saipan in the Mariana Islands, which she reached on 14 May 1944.

=== Fourth war patrol ===
Ro-105 got underway from Saipan on 17 May 1944 for her fourth war patrol in company with the submarine Ro-104. They had orders to join the submarines Ro-108, Ro-112, and Ro-116, which had left Truk on 15 May 1944, and the submarines Ro-106 and Ro-109, which had departed Truk on 16 May 1944, to form a submarine picket line north of the Admiralty Islands designated Scouting Line NA. The picket line was tasked with providing warning of any move toward the Palau Islands by Allied invasion forces.

On 18 May 1944, U.S. Navy signals intelligence personnel intercepted and decrypted Japanese signals indicating the formation of Scouting Line NA between Truk and the Admiralties, and a hunter-killer group composed of the destroyer escorts USS England (DE-635), USS George (DE-697), and USS Raby (DE-698) departed Purvis Bay in the Solomon Islands to intercept the submarine I-16, then attack the submarines assigned to Scouting Line NA. By 27 May 1944, when the three destroyer escorts put in to Seeadler Harbor on Manus Island in the Admiralties to replenish their ammunition, England had sunk I-16, Ro-106, Ro-104, Ro-116, and Ro-108. At Manus, the escort aircraft carrier USS Hoggatt Bay (CVE-75), the destroyers USS Hazelwood (DD-531) and USS McCord (DD-534), and the destroyer escort USS Spangler (DE-696) joined the hunter-killer group, which soon got back underway to attack the surviving submarines of Scouting Line NA.

=== Loss ===
Ro-105 was on the surface north of the Admiralty Islands on 30 May 1944 when Hazelwood established radar contact on her at a range of 6,000 yards (5,500 m) at 01:44. Ro-105 submerged and disappeared from Hazelwood′s radar at 01:53, but Hazelwood quickly gained sonar contact on her and mounted a depth-charge attack. George and Raby took over from Hazelwood at 04:35 and made several Hedgehog attacks while the submerged Ro-105 maneuvered radically to disrupt their sonars and avoid the barrages of Hedgehog projectiles. George appeared to score three hits, but she did not sink Ro-105.

Spangler and England arrived on the scene at 05:00 on 31 May 1944, and Spangler fired a Hedgehog salvo which missed. England made sonar contact at 07:29 and fired a 24-projectile Hedgehog barrage. She scored hits which resulted in a large underwater explosion at 00°47′N 149°56′E, marking the demise of Ro-105. Oil began to reach the surface two hours later within 500 yards (460 m) of the sinking, and the American ships recovered debris from the water.

Ro-105 was the last of six Japanese submarines England sank over a 13-day period in May 1944: She previously had sunk I-16 on 19 May, Ro-106 on 22 May, Ro-104 on 23 May, Ro-116 on 24 May, and Ro-108 on 26 May.

On 25 June 1944, the Imperial Japanese Navy declared Ro-105 to be presumed lost north of the Admiralty Islands with all 55 men on board. The Japanese struck her from the Navy list on 10 August 1944.
