= Japanese submarine Ro-104 =

History

Japan
- Name: Submarine No. 214
- Builder: Kawasaki, Kobe, Japan
- Laid down: 19 November 1941
- Renamed: Ro-104
- Launched: 11 July 1942
- Completed: 25 February 1943
- Commissioned: 25 February 1943
- Fate: Sunk 23 May 1944
- Stricken: 10 August 1944

General characteristics
- Class & type: Ro-100-class submarine
- Displacement: 611 tonnes (601 long tons) surfaced; 795 tonnes (782 long tons) submerged
- Length: 60.90 m (199 ft 10 in) overall
- Beam: 6.00 m (19 ft 8 in)
- Draft: 3.51 m (11 ft 6 in)
- Installed power: 1,000 bhp (750 kW) (diesel); 760 hp (570 kW) (electric motor)
- Propulsion: Diesel-electric; 1 × diesel engine; 1 × electric motor
- Speed: 14.2 knots (26.3 km/h; 16.3 mph) surfaced; 8 knots (15 km/h; 9.2 mph) submerged
- Range: 3,500 nmi (6,500 km; 4,000 mi) at 12 knots (22 km/h; 14 mph) surfaced; 60 nmi (110 km; 69 mi) at 3 knots (5.6 km/h; 3.5 mph) submerged
- Test depth: 75 m (246 ft)
- Crew: 38
- Armament: 4 × bow 533 mm (21 in) torpedo tubes; 2 × 25 mm (1 in) Type 96 anti-aircraft guns or 1 × 76.2 mm (3.00 in) L/40 AA gun

Ro-104 was an Imperial Japanese Navy Ro-100-class submarine. Completed and commissioned in February 1943, she served in World War II, operating in the Aleutian Islands campaign, New Guinea campaign, and Solomon Islands campaign before she was sunk in May 1944 during her tenth war patrol.

== Design and description ==
The Ro-100 class was a medium-sized, coastal submarine derived from the preceding Kaichū type. They displaced 611 tonnes (601 long tons) surfaced and 795 tonnes (782 long tons) submerged. The submarines were 60.9 meters (199 ft 10 in) long, had a beam of 6 meters (19 ft 8 in) and a draft of 3.51 meters (11 ft 6 in). They had a double hull and a diving depth of 75 meters (246 ft).

For surface running, the boats were powered by two 500-brake-horsepower (373 kW) diesel engines, each driving one propeller shaft. When submerged each propeller was driven by a 380-horsepower (283 kW) electric motor. They could reach 14.2 knots (26.3 km/h; 16.3 mph) on the surface and 8 knots (15 km/h; 9.2 mph) underwater. On the surface, the Ro-100s had a range of 3,500 nautical miles (6,500 km; 4,000 mi) at 12 knots (22 km/h; 14 mph); submerged, they had a range of 60 nmi (110 km; 69 mi) at 3 knots (5.6 km/h; 3.5 mph).

The boats were armed with four internal bow 53.3 cm (21.0 in) torpedo tubes and carried a total of eight torpedoes. They were also armed with two single mounts for 25 mm (1 in) Type 96 anti-aircraft guns or a single 76.2 mm (3.00 in) L/40 AA gun.

== Construction and commissioning ==
Ro-104 was laid down as Submarine No. 214 on 19 November 1941 by Kawasaki at Kobe, Japan. She had been renamed Ro-104 by the time she was launched on 11 July 1942. She was completed and commissioned on 25 February 1943.

== Service history ==
=== February–June 1943 ===
Upon commissioning, Ro-104 was attached to the Kure Naval District and was assigned to the Kure Submarine Squadron for workups. She participated in torpedo practice with the submarines I-37, I-38, and Ro-105 on 26 March 1943. She was reassigned to Submarine Squadron 11 on 1 April 1943 and then to Submarine Squadron 7 on 5 June 1943.

=== Aleutian Islands campaign ===
On the day Ro-104 was assigned to Submarine Squadron 7, she was detailed Submarine Squadron 1 for service in the Aleutian Islands, where the Aleutian Islands campaign was in its final stages. The Battle of Attu of 11–30 May 1943 had ended in U.S. forces retaking Attu and annihilating its Japanese garrison, and on 21 May 1943 — even before the battle ended — Japanese Imperial General Headquarters had decided to evacuate the isolated Japanese garrison on Kiska. In operations with Submarine Squadron 1, Ro-104 was to support the evacuation.

Ro-104 departed Kure on 7 June 1943 bound for Paramushiro in the Kurile Islands, which she reached on 13 June 1943. She and the submarine I-31 refueled from the auxiliary fleet oiler Teiyō Maru there on 14 June 1943.

==== First war patrol ====
Ro-104 got underway from Paramushiro on 19 June 1943 for her first war patrol, assigned a patrol area off Kiska. She joined Patrol Line A west of Attu on 23 June 1943 and operated in it until 28 June, when she was reassigned to the Northern Patrol Unit. Early on the morning of 29 June 1943 she sighted what her commanding officer identified as a large transport and began to pursue it. While she was on the surface at 06:45, she spotted a torpedo fired at her by a submerged submarine and crash-dived. She resurfaced two hours later and resumed her pursuit of the transport, but ultimately discontinued the chase when she identified it as a neutral Soviet merchant ship. She returned to Paramushiro on 30 June 1943.

==== Second war patrol ====
Ro-104 departed Paramushiro on 6 July 1943 to begin her second war patrol, again with orders to join Patrol Line A. Her patrol was uneventful, and it concluded with her return to Paramushiro on 21 July 1943. She departed Paramushiro bound for Yokosuka, Japan, which she reached on 28 July 1943.

=== New Guinea campaign, August–October 1943 ===
Ro-104 departed Yokosuka on 14 August 1943 bound for Rabaul on New Britain, which she reached on 26 August 1943.

==== Third war patrol ====
On 4 September 1943, Allied forces landed at Lae, New Guinea, in Operation Postern. Ro-104 departed Rabaul that day to begin her third war patrol, ordered to attack the landing force. She encountered no Allied ships during her patrol, and she returned to Rabaul on 17 September 1943.

==== Fourth war patrol ====
Ro-104 got underway from Rabaul on 23 September 1943 for her fourth war patrol, ordered to join the submarines I-174 and I-177 in intercepting and attacking United States Navy Task Force 76 in the vicinity of Finschafen on New Guinea′s Huon Peninsula. She again found no targets, and she returned to Rabaul on 30 September 1943.

==== Supply runs ====
On 9 October 1943, Ro-104 departed Rabaul to carry supplies to Sarmi on the northern coast of New Guinea in support of Japanese forces fighting in the New Guinea campaign. She reached Sarmi on 11 October 1943, unloaded her cargo, and headed back for Rabaul the same night, arriving there on 13 October 1943. She left Rabaul on another supply run on 16 October 1943, calling at Sarmi to discharge her cargo on 18 October and returning to Rabaul on 20 October 1943. Her third supply run to Sarmi began with her departure from Rabaul. She arrived at Sarmi on 27 October 1943 and unloaded her cargo.

=== Solomon Islands campaign ===
==== Fifth war patrol ====
After discharging her cargo at Sarmi, Ro-104 began her fifth war patrol on 27 October 1943, proceeding directly from Sarmi to a patrol area in the northern Solomon Islands off Bougainville. After an erroneous report of an Allied landing on Mono Island in the Treasury Islands, she received orders on 31 October 1943 to attack the supposed landing force there. On 1 November 1943, however, the Bougainville campaign began with U.S. landings at Cape Torokina on Bougainville, and a Japanese attempt to bring reinforcements to Bougainville resulted in the Battle of Empress Augusta Bay on 2 November 1943. The Japanese light cruiser Sendai was sunk during the battle, and on 3 November 1943 Ro-104 arrived on the scene and rescued 75 survivors from Sendai, including the commander of Destroyer Squadron 3, Rear Admiral Matsuji Ijuin. She arrived at Rabaul on 5 November 1943.

==== Sixth war patrol ====
Ro-104 got underway from Rabaul on 9 November 1943 for her sixth war patrol, ordered to intercept and attack the damaged U.S. Navy light cruiser USS Birmingham (CL-62). She failed to find Birmingham, and on 13 November 1943 received orders to rescue the crews of Mitsubishi G4M (Allied reporting name "Betty") bombers that Allied forces had shot down off Bougainville. She returned to Rabaul on 23 November 1943.

==== Seventh war patrol ====
Ro-104′s seventh war patrol began with her departure from Rabaul on 4 December 1943 bound for a patrol area in the vicinity of Bougainville. The patrol was uneventful, and she returned to Rabaul on 13 December 1943.

=== New Guinea campaign, December 1943–January 1944 ===
==== Eighth war patrol ====
On 26 December 1943, Ro-104 put to sea from Rabaul for her fourth supply run to Sarmi, New Guinea. After delivering her cargo at Sarmi on 28 December 1943, she proceeded to a patrol area in the Dampier Strait. On 30 December 1943, she took up a patrol station off Cape Gloucester on the coast of New Britain, where the Battle of New Britain had begun with U.S. landings on 26 December 1943. She encountered no Allied ships, and she departed her patrol area on 4 January 1944, returning to Rabaul later that day.

==== Gali supply run ====
Ro-104 got underway from Rabaul along with the submarine I-181 on 13 January 1944 to make a supply voyage to Gali, New Guinea. Based on a message Submarine Squadron 7 transmitted on 12 January 1944 that it had intercepted and decrypted, Fleet Radio Unit, Melbourne (FRUMEL) — an Allied signals intelligence unit headquartered in Melbourne, Australia — provided the entire schedule for Ro-104′s voyage to Allied forces on the day of her departure. When she arrived off Gali on the evening of 16 January 1944, she found the area patrolled by Allied destroyers. She loitered at sea until 18 January, then delivered her cargo at Gali and headed back to Rabaul, which she reached on 22 January 1944.

=== January–April 1944 ===
On 31 January 1944, Ro-104 departed Rabaul bound for Kure, where she arrived on 12 February 1944 to undergo repairs and an overhaul. With the work complete, she left Kure on 2 April 1944 and proceeded to Truk.

=== Ninth war patrol ===
Ro-104 departed Truk on 20 April 1944 for her ninth war patrol, assigned a patrol area south of Truk. The patrol was quiet, and she concluded it with her arrival at Saipan in the Mariana Islands.

=== Tenth war patrol ===
On 17 May 1944, Ro-104 began her tenth war patrol, leaving Saipan in company with the submarine Ro-105. They had orders to join the submarines Ro-108, Ro-112, and Ro-116, which had left Truk on 15 May 1944, and the submarines Ro-106 and Ro-109, which had departed Truk on 16 May 1944, to form a submarine picket line north of the Admiralty Islands designated Scouting Line NA. The picket line was tasked with providing warning of any move toward the Palau Islands by Allied invasion forces.

On 18 May 1944, U.S. Navy signals intelligence personnel intercepted and decrypted Japanese signals indicating the formation of picket line "NA" between Truk and the Admiralties, and a hunter-killer group composed of the destroyer escorts USS England (DE-635), USS George (DE-697), and USS Raby (DE-698) departed Purvis Bay in the Solomon Islands to intercept the submarine I-16, then attack the submarines assigned to Scouting Line NA. After England sank I-16 on 19 May 1944, the hunter-killer group turned its attention to Scouting Line NA and had its first success against the line when England sank Ro-106 on 22 May 1944.

=== Loss ===
On 23 May 1944, an Allied patrol plane sighted Ro-104 on the surface 250 nautical miles (460 km; 290 mi) north-northwest of Kavieng, New Ireland, and reported the sighting to the hunter-killer group. Raby acquired radar contact on Ro-104 at a range of 4 nautical miles (7.4 km; 4.6 mi) at 06:04 local time. Ro-104′s radar detector detected Raby′s radar signal, and Ro-104 worked up from 5 to 8 knots (9.3 to 14.8 km/h; 5.8 to 9.2 mph) and crash-dived at 06:10. Raby established sonar contact on Ro-104 at 06:19 and conducted four Hedgehog attacks while Ro-104 made radical evasive maneuvers to disrupt Raby′s sonar — fish-tailing to create wakes and turning into Raby′s wake — and echo-ranged on Raby to confuse her sonar operator. Raby lost contact at about 06:49.

George took over the attack, launching one Hedgehog salvo before she, too, lost contact. Making 5 knots (9.3 km/h; 5.8 mph), Ro-104 attempted to escape to the northwest, but George regained contact, launched a Hedgehog attack, then fired three more Hedgehog barrages between 07:30 and 08:10. All three destroyer escorts then formed a ring around the probable location of Ro-104 in order to reestablish contact.

At 08:19, England moved in to attack and fired two full Hedgehog salvoes. After the second salvo, her crew heard a large underwater explosion and estimated that she had scored 10 to 12 hits on Ro-104 at a depth of 300 feet (91 m). England then dropped a pattern of 13 depth charges set to explode at depths between 350 and 450 feet (107 and 137 m). Debris began to reach the surface at 10:45 and an oil slick began to form, indicating the sinking of Ro-104 at 01°26′N 149°20′E. While their boats recovered debris and oil samples from the water, the three destroyer escorts continued to search for Ro-104 until sunset in case she had survived, but found no sign of her.

Ro-104 was the third of six Japanese submarines England sank over a 13-day period in May 1944: She previously had sunk I-16 on 19 May and Ro-106 on 22 May, and she went on to sink Ro-116 on 24 May, Ro-108 on 26 May, and Ro-105 on 31 May.

On 25 June 1944, the Imperial Japanese Navy declared Ro-104 to be presumed lost with all 58 men on board. The Japanese struck her from the Navy list on 10 August 1944.
