= USS Spangler =

Buckley-class destroyer escort

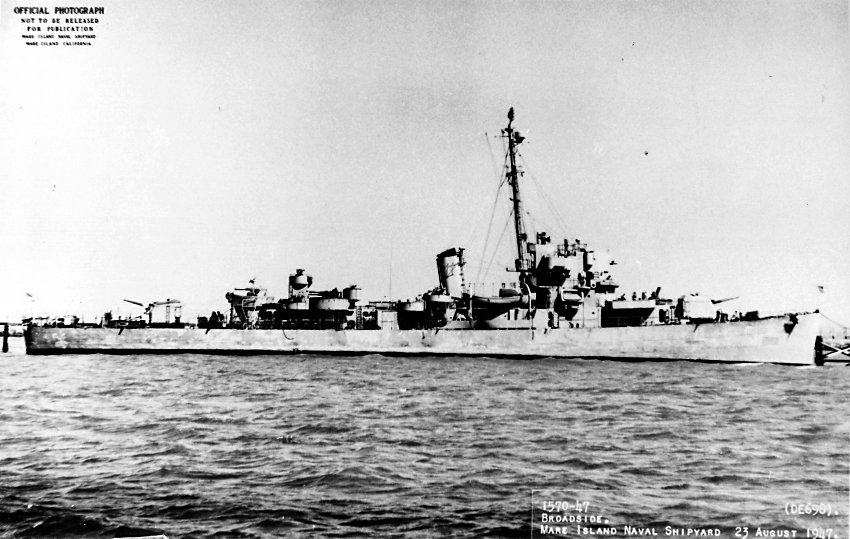

History

United States
- Name: USS Spangler
- Namesake: Donald H. Spangler
- Ordered: 1942
- Builder: Defoe Shipbuilding Company, Bay City, Michigan
- Laid down: 28 April 1943
- Launched: 15 July 1943
- Commissioned: 31 October 1943
- Decommissioned: 8 October 1958
- Stricken: 1 March 1972
- Honors and awards: 2 battle stars (World War II)
- Fate: Sold for scrap, 20 November 1972

General characteristics
- Class & type: Buckley-class destroyer escort
- Displacement: 1,400 long tons (1,422 t) standard; 1,740 long tons (1,768 t) full load
- Length: 306 ft (93 m)
- Beam: 37 ft (11 m)
- Draft: 9 ft 6 in (2.90 m) standard; 11 ft 3 in (3.43 m) full load
- Propulsion: 2 × boilers; General Electric turbo-electric drive; 12,000 shp (8.9 MW); 2 × solid manganese-bronze 3,600 lb (1,600 kg) 3-bladed propellers, 8 ft 6 in (2.59 m) diameter, 7 ft 7 in (2.31 m) pitch; 2 × rudders; 359 tons fuel oil
- Speed: 23 knots (43 km/h; 26 mph)
- Range: 3,700 nmi (6,900 km) at 15 kn (28 km/h; 17 mph); 6,000 nmi (11,000 km) at 12 kn (22 km/h; 14 mph)
- Complement: 15 officers, 210 men
- Armament: 3 × 3"/50 caliber guns; 1 × quad 1.1"/75 caliber gun; 8 × single 20 mm guns; 1 × triple 21-inch (533 mm) torpedo tubes; 1 × Hedgehog anti-submarine mortar; 8 × K-gun depth charge projectors; 2 × depth charge tracks

USS Spangler (DE-696) was a Buckley-class destroyer escort of the United States Navy. The ship was named after Donald Spangler, a naval officer killed aboard USS Atlanta during the Naval Battle of Guadalcanal on 13 November 1942.

== Construction and commissioning ==
Spangler was laid down on 28 April 1943 at the Defoe Shipbuilding Company, Bay City, Michigan. She was launched on 15 July 1943; sponsored by Mrs. Myrtle Spangler; and commissioned on 31 October 1943, with Lieutenant Commander W. A. Burgett in command.

== Service history ==
=== World War II, 1943–1945 ===
After shakedown in the vicinity of Bermuda, Spangler joined a convoy on 24 December 1943, and headed for the Pacific via the Panama Canal. She arrived at Bora Bora in the Society Islands, on 20 January 1944. There she received orders to rendezvous with convoy Task Unit 116.15.3 as the flagship of Commander Escort Division 39, and to head for Espiritu Santo New Hebrides Islands. In mid-February, she escorted Shasta (AE-6) to Purvis Bay, Florida Island, in the Solomons, and then took up patrol station off Guadalcanal two days later. After escorting Alnitah (AK-127) to Torokina Point on Bougainville, she rounded out the month patrolling off Blanche Harbor, Treasury Island, and off Purvis Bay. For the next three months, Spangler escorted convoys on shuttle runs between various islands in the South Pacific. During that period, she visited Guadalcanal, Espiritu Santo, New Caledonia, Florida Island, Majuro, Emirau, Rendova, and Manus.

In late May, Spangler sailed from Tulagi to the Admiralty Islands with a supply of hedgehog depth charges for her sister destroyer escorts England (DE-635), Raby (DE-698), and George (DE-697). She rendezvoused with the three ships at Manus on 27 May, delivered her cargo, and the four ships sortied the next day to join a hunter/killer group formed around the escort carrier Hoggatt Bay (CVE-75). The task group was steaming north during the waning hours of 30 May when the destroyer Hazelwood (DD-531) made a sound contact on the Ro-105. While England and Spangler headed toward the southern end of the scouting line, Raby and George charged to the attack. Both ships attacked the enemy, but with no apparent success. During the night, they lost contact with the submerged enemy. However, after a few hours, the Japanese commanding officer obligingly surfaced between Raby and George, and switched on his searchlights. England and Spangler raced toward the shaft of light which fixed Ro-105's position for them perfectly. By 05:00 on 31 May, they were in contact with Raby and George, and with the Officer in Tactical Command (OTC). At first light, Raby and George each attacked the Japanese submarine in quick succession. When their efforts failed, Spangler joined the fray. She attacked with 24 depth charges, but without success. England's full pattern of depth charges at 07:35 brought a huge explosion and a watery grave to Ro-105.

On 2 June, the ships joined Task Group 30.4 (TG 30.4) and returned to Seeadler Harbor at Manus. Spangler continued to operate with Hoggatt Bay until 21 June, when she headed for Purvis Bay and overhaul. From the completion of overhaul in late July until the end of September, the destroyer escort operated out of Purvis Bay on escort assignments and anti-submarine warfare training. During that period, she called at Guadalcanal, Espiritu Santo, Barika Island, Tulagi, Eniwetok, Tarawa, and Hollandia. In October, Spangler became station ship at Funafuti in the Ellice Islands. However, she was employed in this role only briefly, and soon returned to Purvis Bay and escort duty, and, for the remainder of 1944, screened ships shuttling to Kossol Passage, Ulithi, and Guam.

Spangler's base of operations was changed to Guam on New Year's Day 1945. She was assigned to escort duty on the Guam-Ulithi supply route and the additional duty of hunter-killer operations. Over the next three months, she escorted and patrolled as a part of the Marianas-Iwo Jima air-sea rescue unit. From 26 April to 27 May, she served as station ship at Saipan; then she returned to her screening station off Guam until the end of World War II. On 4 September, after returning to Guam from Okinawa, Spangler got underway, in company with Raby, and headed back to the United States. The two destroyer escorts stopped at Pearl Harbor on 22 September; then continued on to San Pedro, Los Angeles, for overhaul.

=== Post-war activities, 1946–1958 ===
After overhaul, Spangler departed the west coast on 20 February 1946 to return to the Western Pacific, via Pearl Harbor and Guam. She remained in the Far East for the next five months and, during the deployment, visited the Chinese ports of Swatow, Hong Kong, Shanghai, and Tsingtao. Spangler put in at Okinawa on 19 November, and remained until 1 February 1947, when she got underway in company with Osmus (DE-701) and Currier (DE-700) to return to the United States.

Spangler entered San Diego on 2 March 1947 and, for the next eight and one-half years, operated out of that port along the California coast. During those years, she often visited Long Beach and San Francisco, and made five voyages to Hawaii and one to Acapulco, Mexico. On 4 October 1955, the destroyer escort departed San Diego for the western Pacific. She stopped briefly at Pearl Harbor and at Midway Atoll, and made Yokosuka, Japan, on 22 October. Spangler was deployed for six months, during which time she visited Sasebo, Japan; Hong Kong; and Subic Bay in the Philippines. She left Yokosuka on 13 March 1956 and after stops at Midway and Pearl Harbor, reached San Diego on 31 March. With the exception of one short trip to Long Beach and back in mid-September, Spangler spent the remainder of 1956 in port at San Diego.

On 3 January 1957, the destroyer escort again headed westward from San Diego. This voyage took Spangler on a tour to many of the places made famous over a decade before; among her ports of call were Kwajalein Atoll and Auckland, New Zealand, in January; Manus in the Admiralty Islands in February, Guam in February and March; and Corregidor, Manila, and Singapore in April. She also visited Yokosuka, Japan; Sattahip, Thailand; Hong Kong; Kaohsiung, Taiwan; Sasebo, Japan; Chinhae, Korea; and Kobe and Beppu, Japan. On 20 June 1957, Spangler headed homeward from Yokosuka. She returned to San Diego on 7 July, and, for the next 15 months, operated along the west coast.

=== Decommissioning and sale ===
On 8 October 1958, Spangler was decommissioned at Astoria, Oregon, and joined the Columbia River Group of the Pacific Reserve Fleet. She remained in reserve until 1 March 1972, when her name was struck from the Navy list. Her hulk was sold on 20 November 1972 to Zidell Explorations, Inc., of Portland, Oregon, for scrapping.

== Awards ==
Spangler earned two battle stars during World War II.
