= Japanese submarine Ro-106 =

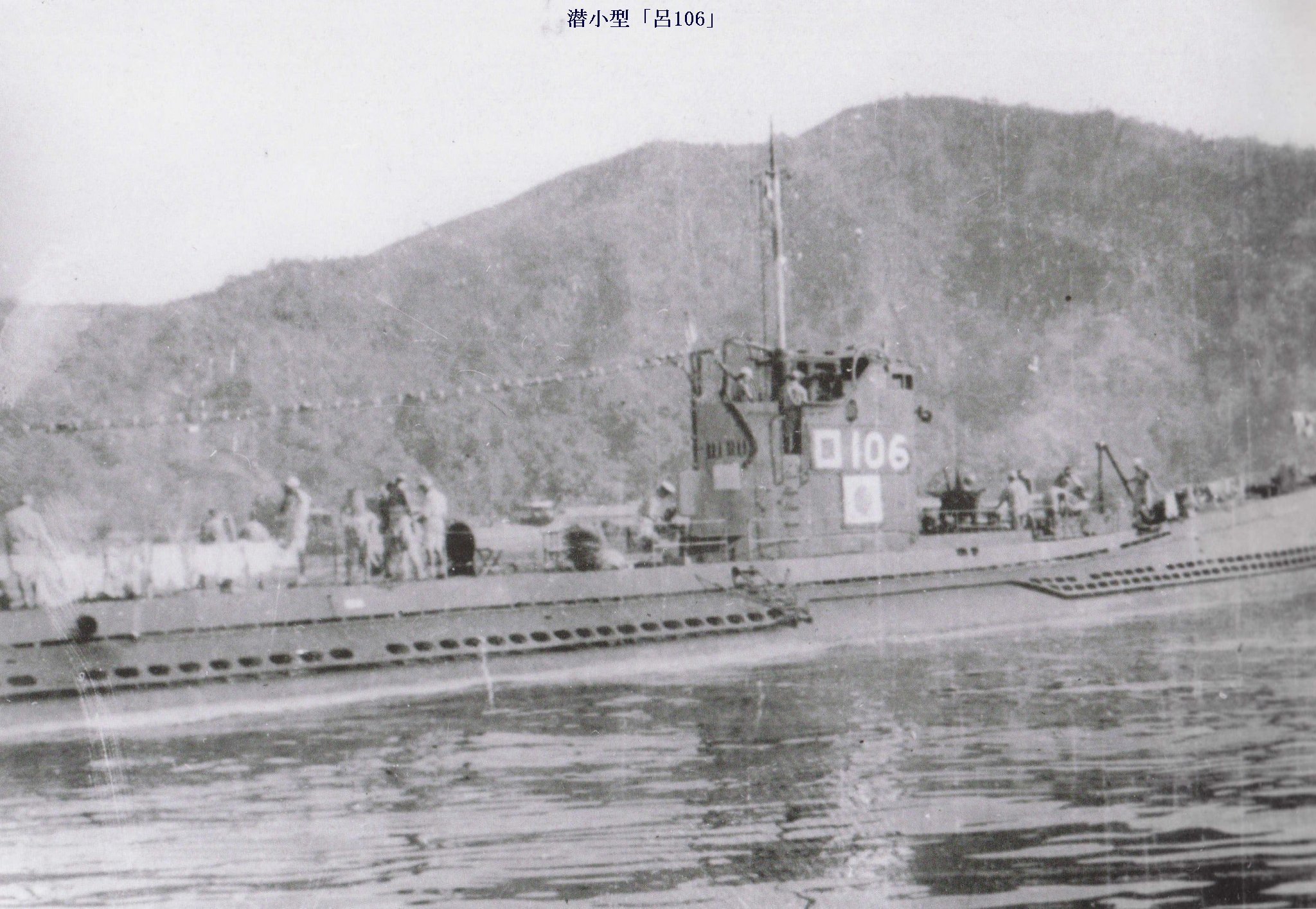
- Ro-106 anchored off Rabaul, 30 May 1943

History

Japan
- Name: Submarine No. 216
- Builder: Kure Naval Arsenal, Kure, Japan
- Laid down: 17 December 1941
- Launched: 30 May 1942
- Completed: 26 December 1942
- Commissioned: 26 December 1942
- Renamed: Ro-106 on 8 April 1942
- Stricken: 10 August 1944
- Fate: Sunk 22 May 1944

General characteristics
- Class & type: Ro-100-class submarine
- Displacement: 611 tonnes (601 long tons) surfaced; 795 tonnes (782 long tons) submerged
- Length: 60.90 m (199 ft 10 in) overall
- Beam: 6.00 m (19 ft 8 in)
- Draft: 3.51 m (11 ft 6 in)
- Installed power: 1,000 bhp (750 kW) (diesel); 760 hp (570 kW) (electric motor)
- Propulsion: Diesel-electric; 1 × diesel engine; 1 × electric motor
- Speed: 14.2 knots (26.3 km/h; 16.3 mph) surfaced; 8 knots (15 km/h; 9.2 mph) submerged
- Range: 3,500 nmi (6,500 km; 4,000 mi) at 12 knots (22 km/h; 14 mph) surfaced; 60 nmi (110 km; 69 mi) at 3 knots (5.6 km/h; 3.5 mph) submerged
- Test depth: 75 m (246 ft)
- Crew: 38
- Armament: 4 × bow 533 mm (21 in) torpedo tubes; 2 × 25 mm (1 in) Type 96 anti-aircraft guns or 1 × 76.2 mm (3.00 in) L/40 AA gun

Ro-106 was an Imperial Japanese Navy Ro-100-class submarine. Completed and commissioned in December 1942, she served in World War II, operating in the Solomon Islands campaign, New Guinea campaign, and central Pacific Ocean. She was sunk in May 1944 during her eleventh war patrol.

== Design and description ==
The Ro-100 class was a medium-sized, coastal submarine derived from the preceding Kaichū type. They displaced 611 tonnes (601 long tons) surfaced and 795 tonnes (782 long tons) submerged. The submarines were 60.9 meters (199 ft 10 in) long, had a beam of 6 meters (19 ft 8 in) and a draft of 3.51 meters (11 ft 6 in). They had a double hull and a diving depth of 75 meters (246 ft).

For surface running, the boats were powered by two 500-brake-horsepower (373 kW) diesel engines, each driving one propeller shaft. When submerged each propeller was driven by a 380-horsepower (283 kW) electric motor. They could reach 14.2 knots (26.3 km/h; 16.3 mph) on the surface and 8 knots (15 km/h; 9.2 mph) underwater. On the surface, the Ro-100s had a range of 3,500 nautical miles (6,500 km; 4,000 mi) at 12 knots (22 km/h; 14 mph); submerged, they had a range of 60 nmi (110 km; 69 mi) at 3 knots (5.6 km/h; 3.5 mph).

The boats were armed with four internal bow 53.3 cm (21.0 in) torpedo tubes and carried a total of eight torpedoes. They were also armed with two single mounts for 25 mm (1 in) Type 96 anti-aircraft guns or a single 76.2 mm (3.00 in) L/40 AA gun.

== Construction and commissioning ==
Ro-106 was laid down as Submarine No. 216 on 17 December 1941 by the Kure Naval Arsenal at Kure, Japan. She was renamed Ro-106 on 8 April 1942 and was launched on 30 May 1942. She was completed and commissioned on 26 December 1942.

== Service history ==
Upon commissioning, Ro-106 was attached to the Sasebo Naval District and was assigned to Submarine Squadron 11. While on workups in the Hayase Seto off Kure on 15 February 1943, her rudder jammed and she ran aground and suffered hull damage. She was towed to Kure for repairs. On 15 March 1943, she was reassigned to Submarine Squadron 7 in the 8th Fleet in the Southeast Area Fleet. She departed Sasebo on 31 March 1943 bound for Rabaul on New Britain, which she reached on 12 April 1943.

=== First, second, and third war patrols ===
Ro-106 got underway from Rabaul on 22 April 1943 for her first war patrol, assigned a patrol area southeast of Guadalcanal in the Solomon Islands. It was uneventful, and she returned to Rabaul on 14 May 1943. She put to sea to begin her second war patrol on 27 May 1943, but diesel engine trouble forced her to return to Rabaul on 29 May 1943. She began her third war patrol on 31 May 1943, bound again for a patrol area southeast of Guadalcanal. After another quiet patrol, she set course for Rabaul, which she reached on 16 June 1943.

=== Fourth war patrol ===
On 30 June 1943, the New Georgia campaign began with the U.S. landings on New Georgia, Rendova, and other islands in the central Solomons. Ro-106 departed Rabaul that day to begin her fourth war patrol, assigned a patrol area off Rendova. On 18 July 1943, she torpedoed the United States Navy tank landing ship USS LST-342 in the Blanche Channel off New Georgia at 09°03′S 158°11′E. The torpedo blew LST-342 in half; her stern section sank immediately, but her bow section remained afloat and was towed to Purvis Bay, beached on Gavutu, and stripped of usable materials and equipment. Meanwhile, Ro-106 concluded her patrol with her return to Rabaul on 21 July 1943.

=== Fifth and sixth war patrols ===
Ro-106 set out from Rabaul on 31 July 1943 to begin her fifth war patrol. It was uneventful, and on 20 August 1943 she returned to Rabaul, where she was reassigned to the new Submarine Division 51 along with the submarines Ro-100, Ro-101, Ro-103, Ro-104, and Ro-105, with Ro-105 serving as squadron flagship. She departed Rabaul on 1 September 1943 for her sixth war patrol, assigned a patrol area off San Cristobal in the southeastern Solomon Islands. She found no targets, and on 22 September 1943 received orders to divert from her patrol to rescue Imperial Japanese Navy Air Service aviators who had been shot down on 20 September. She then made for Rabaul, where she arrived on 24 September 1943.

=== New Guinea campaign ===
On 6 October 1943, Ro-106 departed Rabaul to carry supplies to Sarmi on the northern coast of New Guinea in support of Japanese forces fighting in the New Guinea campaign. She reached Sarmi on 7 October 1943, unloaded her cargo, and got back underway the same night. Rather than return to Rabaul, she received orders on 9 October 1943 to operate off Lae, New Guinea, conducting her seventh war patrol. She was off Lae on 19 October 1943 when an Allied plane spotted her and reported her to Allied warships, probably including the U.S. Navy destroyer USS Mahan (DD-364), which reported depth-charging a submarine off Lae that day. She suffered serious damage in the depth-charge attacks the Allied ships conducted against her, and after calling at Rabaul from 23 to 27 October 1943 she proceeded to Sasebo, which she reached on 8 November 1943 to undergo repairs.

With her repairs complete, Ro-106 departed Sasebo on 16 December 1943 bound for Rabaul, where she arrived on 29 December 1943. After a little over a month there, she set out for her second supply run to Sarmi on 1 February 1944. She called at Sarmi on 3 February and returned to Rabaul on 5 February 1944. Another supply run to Sarmi followed, with Ro-106 departing Rabaul on 10 February 1944, discharging her cargo on 12 February, and returning to Rabaul on 14 February 1944.

=== Eighth war patrol ===
On 19 February 1944, Ro-106 was reassigned to the 1st Advance Submarine Unit and set out from Rabaul for her eighth war patrol, ordered to operate within a 90-nautical-mile (170 km; 100 mi) radius of Natsushima at Truk to intercept U.S. Navy Task Force 58, which had made a major air and surface attack against Truk on 17–18 February 1944 in Operation Hailstone. She found no targets, and on 1 March 1944 received orders to move to the Eniwetok area. She conducted a periscope reconnaissance of Eniwetok on 4 March 1944 and found no ships there, but when she returned to reconnoiter the atoll again on 5 March 1944 she sighted what she reported as several cruisers, destroyers, and a repair ship there. She returned to Truk on 8 March 1944, the day on which Truk-based Mitsubishi G4M (Allied reporting name "Betty") bombers of the 705th Naval Air Group raided the anchorage at Eniwetok to attack the ships she had sighted.

=== Ninth and tenth war patrols ===
Two uneventful war patrols from Truk followed. Ro-106 began her ninth patrol on 17 March 1944, bound for a patrol area southeast of Truk and north of the Nomoi Islands. She called at Truk from 24 to 29 March 1944, then set out on her tenth war patrol, assigned a patrol area east of Eniwetok. She returned to Truk on 20 April 1944. She again sortied from Truk on 30 April 1944 to intercept an Allied task force, but found no enemy ships and returned to Truk on 3 May 1944.

=== Eleventh war patrol ===
Ro-106 got underway from Truk on 16 May 1944 for her eleventh war patrol, ordered to join the submarines Ro-104, Ro-105, Ro-108, Ro-109, Ro-112, and Ro-116 in forming a submarine picket line north of the Admiralty Islands designated Scouting Line NA. The picket line was tasked with providing warning of any move toward the Palau Islands by Allied invasion forces. After Ro-106 departed Truk, the Japanese never heard from her again.

On 18 May 1944, U.S. Navy signals intelligence personnel intercepted and decrypted Japanese signals indicating the formation of Scouting Line NA between Truk and the Admiralties. A U.S. Navy hunter-killer group composed of the destroyer escorts USS England (DE-635), USS George (DE-697), and USS Raby (DE-698) departed Purvis Bay in the Solomon Islands to intercept the submarine I-16, then attack the submarines assigned to Scouting Line NA. After England sank I-16 on 19 May 1944, the hunter-killer group turned its attention to Scouting Line NA.

=== Loss ===
Ro-106 was on the surface north of the Admiralty Islands at 03:51 on 22 May 1944 when George established radar contact on her at a range of 14,000 yards (12,800 m) bearing 303 degrees from George. Shortly thereafter, England also detected Ro-106 on radar and assessed the contact as a surfaced submarine. While George and Raby closed the range, England steamed northeast to cut off Ro-106′s escape.

Ro-106′s radar detector apparently did not detect the radar signals from the approaching destroyer escorts and she was still on the surface when George illuminated her with searchlights at a range of 4,000 yards (3,700 m). She crash-dived and began radical maneuvers to disrupt and confuse the sonars aboard the destroyer escorts and avoid hits by their antisubmarine weapons. George achieved sonar contact on her at 04:10 and fired a barrage of Hedgehog projectiles, but missed.

At 04:25, England detected Ro-106 on sonar at a range of 2,500 yards (2,300 m) bearing 193 degrees from England. England launched an unsuccessful Hedgehog attack, then opened the range, turned back, and closed for another attack. Ro-106 also reversed course and approached England head-on. England made her second Hedgehog attack at 05:01, resulting in three underwater explosions at a depth of 275 feet (84 m). Ro-106 sank with all hands in 16,200 feet (4,940 m) of water at 01°40′N 150°31′E.

Ro-106 was the second of six Japanese submarines England sank over a 13-day period in May 1944: She previously had sunk I-16 on 19 May, and she went on to sink Ro-104 on 23 May, Ro-116 on 24 May, Ro-108 on 26 May, and Ro-105 on 31 May.

On 15 June 1944, the Imperial Japanese Navy declared Ro-106 to be presumed lost north of the Admiralty Islands with all 49 men on board. The Japanese struck her from the Navy list on 10 August 1944.
