= Japanese submarine I-37 =

1st class submarine of the Imperial Japanese Navy

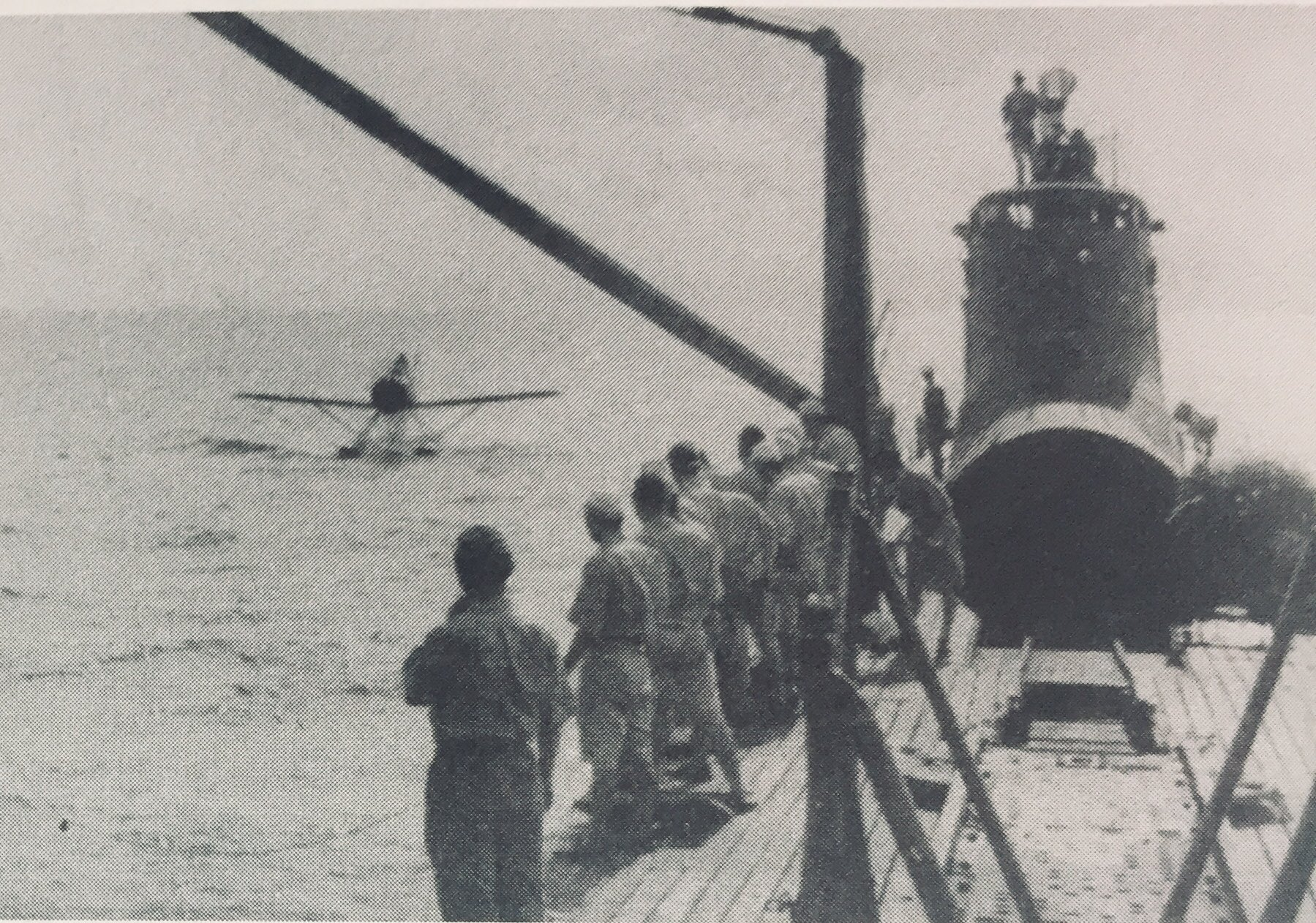
- I-37 preparing to recover her E14Y floatplane while on patrol in the Indian Ocean, September 1943

History

Imperial Japan
- Name: Submarine No. 150
- Ordered: 1939
- Builder: Kure Naval Arsenal, Kure, Japan
- Laid down: 7 December 1940
- Launched: 22 October 1941
- Renamed: I-49, 22 October 1941; I-37, 1 November 1941
- Completed: 10 March 1943
- Commissioned: 10 March 1943
- Fate: Sunk 19 November 1944
- Stricken: 10 March 1945

General characteristics
- Class & type: Type B1 submarine
- Type: Cruiser submarine
- Displacement: 2,589 long tons (2,631 t) surfaced; 3,654 long tons (3,713 t) submerged
- Length: 108.7 m (356 ft 8 in)
- Beam: 9.3 m (30 ft 6 in)
- Draft: 5.1 m (16 ft 9 in)
- Propulsion: Diesel-electric: 1 × diesel engine, 12,400 bhp (9,247 kW); 1 × electric motor, 2,000 hp (1,491 kW)
- Speed: 23.5 knots (43.5 km/h; 27.0 mph) surfaced; 8 knots (15 km/h; 9.2 mph) submerged
- Range: 14,000 nmi (26,000 km; 16,000 mi) at 16 knots (30 km/h; 18 mph) surfaced; 96 nmi (178 km); 110 mi at 3 knots (5.6 km/h; 3.5 mph) submerged
- Test depth: 100 m (328 ft)
- Crew: 94
- Armament: 6 × bow 533 mm (21 in) torpedo tubes; 1 × 14 cm (5.5 in) deck gun (removed September 1944); 2 × single 25 mm (0.98 in) Type 96 anti-aircraft guns; 4 x kaiten (added September 1944)
- Aircraft carried: 1 x Yokosuka E14Y1 floatplane (removed September 1944)
- Aviation facilities: 1 x catapult (removed September 1944); 1 x hangar (removed September 1944)

I-37, originally numbered I-49, was a Japanese Type B1 submarine in service with the Imperial Japanese Navy during World War II. Commissioned in 1943, she made three war patrols, all in the Indian Ocean, during the last of which her crew committed war crimes by massacring the survivors of the merchant ships she sank. Subsequently, converted into a kaiten manned suicide attack torpedo carrier, she was sunk during her first kaiten mission in 1944.

== Design ==
I-37 was 108.7 meters (356 feet 8 inches) long and had a beam of 9.3 meters (30 feet 6 inches) and a draft of 5.1 meters (16 feet 9 inches). She could dive to 100 meters (328 feet) She was armed with six internal bow 53.3 cm (21 in) torpedo tubes and carried a total of 17 torpedoes. I-37 was also armed with a single 140 mm (5.5 in)/40 deck gun and two single mounts for Type 96 anti-aircraft guns. Designed as a submarine aircraft carrier, she had a hangar and an aircraft catapult and could carry one Yokosuka E14Y1 (Allied reporting name "Glen") reconnaissance floatplane.

== Construction and commissioning ==
I-37 was laid down at the Kure Naval Arsenal in Kure, Japan, as Submarine No. 150 on 7 December 1940. She was both launched and renumbered I-49 on 22 October 1941, then again renumbered I-37 on 1 November 1941. She was completed and commissioned on 10 March 1943.

== Service history ==
=== March–June 1943 ===
Upon commissioning, I-37 was attached to the Kure Naval District and assigned to the Kure Submarine Squadron. She passed through the Iyo Nada in the Seto Inland Sea on 13 March 1943, and on 22 March underwent inspection by the staff of the Kure Submarine Squadron. She participated in torpedo practice with the submarines I-38, Ro-104, and Ro-105 on 26 March. On 1 April 1943, she was reassigned to Submarine Division 11 for work-ups and on 2 April she arrived at Kure for repairs to her attack periscope and retractable short-wave radio antenna. After the completion of her repairs, she took part during May 1943 in testing in the Seto Inland Sea of the Unkato cargo container, a 135-foot (41.1 m) submersible container that could carry up to 377 tons of supplies, designed for a one-way trip in which the cargo's recipients released, recovered, and unloaded it. Workers installed a Type 22 radar aboard her in May 1943.

With her workups and testing completed, I-37 was reassigned to Submarine Division 14 in Submarine Squadron 8 in the 6th Fleet on 23 May 1943. She got underway from Kure on 25 May bound for Penang in Japanese-occupied British Malaya, which she reached on 4 June 1943.

=== First war patrol ===
I-37 departed Penang on 8 June 1943 to begin her first war patrol, assigned a patrol area in the Indian Ocean between the Chagos Archipelago and the Persian Gulf. She had her first success on 16 June 1943, when she torpedoed the 8,078-gross register ton British armed motor tanker MV San Ernesto — which was on a voyage in ballast from Sydney, Australia, to Abadan, Iran — southeast of the Chagos Archipelago. After San Ernesto′s crew abandoned ship at 09°18′S 080°20′E, I-37 briefly opened gunfire on San Ernesto before departing the area with her still afloat. Altogether, two members of San Ernesto′s crew and two of her gunners lost their lives; an American Liberty ship, SS Alcoa Pointer, rescued San Ernesto′s master and 22 others, while 12 other members of her crew came ashore in another lifeboat on Fanhandu Island in the Maldives on 14 July 1943 after 28 days at sea. The derelict San Ernesto herself remained afloat, drifting 2,000 nautical miles (3,700 km; 2,300 mi) across the Indian Ocean before eventually running aground on the west side of Nias Island off Sumatra in the Japanese-occupied Netherlands East Indies at 01°15′N 097°15′E.

On 19 June 1943, I-37 hit the 7,176-ton American Liberty ship SS Henry Knox — bound from Fremantle, Australia, to Bandar Shapur with an 8,200-ton Lend-Lease cargo of fighter aircraft, tanks, and explosives destined for the Soviet Union — with one torpedo in her port side at 01°00′N 071°15′E. The torpedo detonated the explosives in her No.3 hold, and the explosion showered burning debris over Henry Knox, bringing her to a stop and setting her deck cargo and catwalk on fire. At 19:07, her crew abandoned ship, with 25 crewmen and United States Navy Armed Guard personnel losing their lives in the explosion, the fire, and shark attacks, and after several explosions, Henry Knox sank by the bow at around 22:00. Meanwhile, I-37 surfaced, hove to, and ordered the chief mate's lifeboat alongside. Her navigator interrogated the survivors in the boat about their cargo, route, and destination, and about any Allied vessels they had encountered in the area, after which the Japanese ordered the men in the lifeboat to pass various items to I-37 via a handline. The Japanese confiscated the lifeboat's sails, nautical charts, some of its rations, and a flashlight, but returned personal items, matches, and liquor to the lifeboat before departing the area. The survivors then made for the Maldives in several groups. Before the last of them reached land on 30 June 1943, 13 of Henry Knox′s 42 merchant mariners and 13 of her 25 Navy Armed Guards personnel had died. The survivors from the boat that had gone alongside I-37 reported that she had a hangar and a degaussing coil, that her diesel engines started without hesitation — indicating that the engines were in excellent condition and were using high-quality diesel fuel — and that a stereoscopic camera equipped with a filtering mechanism was mounted on her conning tower.

By 1 July 1943, I-37 was part of the Advance Force, as was the rest of Submarine Squadron 8 (the submarines I-8, I-10, I-27, and I-29). On 9 July, she conducted a reconnaissance of the coast of the Persian Gulf. She returned to Penang on 17 August 1943.

=== August–September 1943 ===
I-37 departed Penang on 22 August 1943 and moved to Singapore. She set out from Singapore on 5 September 1943 for the return voyage to Penang. On 12 September 1943, she was reassigned to the Southwest Area Fleet.

=== Second war patrol ===
I-37 got underway from Penang in mid-September 1943 to begin her second war patrol, again in the Indian Ocean, with an embarked Yokosuka E14Y1 (Allied reporting name "Glen") floatplane, but soon thereafter one of her crewmen came down with appendicitis, and she returned to Penang to seek medical attention for him. She then set out again on 20 September 1943 to begin the patrol, assigned a patrol area in the Mozambique Channel and the vicinity of Mombasa, British East Africa. On 28 September, the British Admiralty sent a message based on Ultra information to Allied forces in the area warning them of the possibility that Japanese submarine-based seaplanes would conduct reconnaissance flights in the Gulf of Aden, Gulf of Oman, and an area west of 54 degrees East between 1 degree 30 minutes North and 1 degree South. On 11 October 1943, I-37′s floatplane reconnoitered the harbor at Diego Suarez, Madagascar, its crew reporting the anchorage to be heavily guarded.

Northwest of Madagascar, I-37 torpedoed and sank the Greek 3,404-gross register ton merchant ship SS Faneromeni on 23 October 1943. She reported that she attacked two Allied merchant ships in the Mozambique Channel southeast of Pemba Island, one on 4 November 1943 which probably was the 2,850-gross register ton Norwegian steamer SS Hallbyørg, and a different ship during the afternoon of 5 November, and that each time she fired one torpedo, which missed the target. Some historians since have suggested that I-37 actually attacked Hallbyørg twice and fired three torpedoes on each occasion. On 17 November 1943, I-37′s floatplane flew a reconnaissance mission over Kilindini Harbour at Mombasa.

Just after sunset on 27 November 1943, at 12:40 Zulu Time, I-37 torpedoed the Norwegian 9,972-gross register ton armed tanker MV Scotia, which had separated from Convoy PB-64 to proceed independently during a voyage from Bahrain to Melbourne, Australia, with a cargo of diesel oil. A torpedo hit Scotia′s starboard quarter, disabling her steering and bringing her to a stop, and she took on a 15-degree starboard list. Her crew abandoned ship while her first engineer and radio operator remained aboard to transmit an SSS signal, a variant of the SOS signal indicating distress due to submarine attack. I-37 fired another torpedo at Scotia which hit her in her starboard engine room at around 12:55 Zulu Time and broke her in two. Her stern section immediately sank at 03°00′S 069°08′E, but the bow section remained afloat. I-37 surfaced and opened gunfire on it, sinking it as well. I-37 took Scotia′s master aboard as a prisoner-of-war. One survivor later testified that I-37′s crew fired at his lifeboat with a submachine gun, killing eight men. On 29–30 November 1943, the patrol vessel HMS Okapi rescued 31 survivors. I-37 returned to Penang on 5 December 1943.

=== December 1943–January 1944 ===
On 12 December 1943, I-37 departed Penang bound for Singapore, which she reached on 13 December. On 15 December, she went into drydock at the naval base at Seletar in Singapore for an overhaul; the same day, Submarine Division 14 was abolished and she was attached directly to the 8th Fleet. She undocked on 18 December 1943 and embarked provisions, and on 27 December 1943 received a new commanding officer, Commander Hajime Nakagawa. She departed Singapore on 12 January 1944 and set course for Penang, where she arrived on 15 January 1944. In early February 1944, most of her officers left her for new assignments, and new officers replaced them. A former crewmember of I-37 later testified that Nakagawa received authorization from the Commander of Submarine Squadron 8 to carry out reprisals against the crews of Allied armed merchant ships in retaliation for the alleged slaughter of Japanese merchant ship crews by Allied submarines.

=== Third war patrol ===
With a Yokosuka E14Y1 (Allied reporting name "Glen") floatplane embarked, I-37 got underway from Penang on 10 February 1944 to begin her third war patrol, heading for a patrol area in the Indian Ocean in the Madagascar area. At 00:30 on 14 February, she sighted an Allied merchant ship south of Ceylon and pursued it on the surface for 24 1/2 hours. The ship was making at least 16 knots (30 km/h; 18 mph) and, unable to overtake it, I-37 finally discontinued the chase at 01:00 on 15 February.

On 22 February 1944, I-37 attacked the British 7,118-gross register ton armed tanker SS British Chivalry — which had departed Melbourne on 1 February 1944 to steam in ballast to Abadan — in the Indian Ocean south of Addu Atoll in the Maldives, firing two torpedoes at her. British Chivalry′s crew sighted I-37′s periscope and the approaching torpedoes; she began an evasive turn, and one torpedo passed astern of her, but the other hit her in her starboard side. The torpedo hits knocked out British Chivalry′s engines, destroyed two of her lifeboats, and killed six members of her crew. Her 53 surviving crewmen abandoned ship in her two remaining lifeboats, one of them motorized. While the motorized lifeboat began the process of collecting provisions from four uninhabited life rafts cast overboard before British Chivalry′s crew abandoned ship, I-37 surfaced either 660 yards (600 m) or 1 nautical mile (1.9 km; 1.2 mi) away from British Chivalry (according to different sources) and fired seventeen 140-millimeter (5.5 in) rounds at her. The first six landed near the lifeboat with British Chivalry′s master, Captain Walter Hill, aboard, and then I-37′s gunners concentrated on British Chivalry, scoring three hits as I-37 closed to a range of less than 200 yards (180 m). I-37 then fired another torpedo which hit British Chivalry in her port side admidships, sinking her at 11:30 at 00°50′S 068°00′E.

After British Chivalry sank, I-37 turned her attention to the lifeboats, opening fire on them with her 25-millimeter antiaircraft guns. When an officer aboard one of the boats signaled I-37 for instructions by semaphore, I-37 ceased fire and ordered the boats to come alongside one at a time. I-37′s medical officer interrogated the men in the lifeboats, and I-37 brought Captain Hill aboard as a prisoner-of-war, forcing him to surrender his briefcase, which contained about fifty diamonds and sapphires. I-37 ordered the motorized lifeboat to take the other boat in tow and head westward, and I-37 proceeded toward the east. I-37 then reversed course and approached the boats at speed, and Nakagawa ordered the crew of I-37′s floatplane and two members of I-37′s crew to open fire on the survivors, with Captain Hill forced to stand on deck and watch. For 90 minutes, I-37 repeatedly passed within a few yards of the boats and fired on them, holing them and killing and wounding men who had gone overboard and clung to the sides of the boats for cover, as well as fishtailing her stern back and forth near the boats to slice up men in the water with her propellers. At 14:00, 3 1/2 hours after torpedoing British Chivalry, I-37 finally ceased fire and headed off to the east after killing 13 men and wounding five on the boats and in the water. After drifting 320 nautical miles (590 km; 370 mi) to the south-southwest over the next 37 days, British Chivalry′s 38 survivors — 29 crewmen and nine gunners — finally were rescued by the British merchant ship SS Delane at 04°55′S 065°32′E.

While I-37 was on the surface in the Arabian Sea 200 nautical miles (370 km; 230 mi) west of Diego Garcia at 20:30 on 26 February 1944, her lookouts sighted the British 5,189-gross register ton armed motor vessel MV Sutlej, which, after departing Aden on 15 February as part of a convoy, had detached from the convoy on 20 February midway across the Arabian Sea to proceed independently during a voyage from Kosseir, Egypt, to Fremantle, Australia, with a cargo of 9,700 tons of rock phosphates and mail. Soon after dark, the submerged I-37 fired two torpedoes at Sutlej from a range of 2,190 yards (2,000 m). Sutlej′s crew sighted an incoming torpedo and began an evasive turn, but one torpedo hit Sutlej in her port side, and she sank just under four minutes later at 08°S 070°E. Her survivors abandoned ship in a lifeboat and several life rafts, although many men ended up floating in life jackets in the water. As men in the rafts and lifeboat were pulling other men from the water, I-37 surfaced and used a searchlight to illuminate the area, discovering a teenage Indian boy clinging to her rudder. After I-37 took him aboard, her searchlight settled on one of the life rafts. She brought the raft alongside, and her medical officer, speaking from the bridge, interrogated the men aboard it about Sutlej′s identity, cargo, departure port, and destination and attempted to identify Sutlej′s master. Informed that he had gone down with his ship, I-37 moved away, then attempted to ram the raft, succeeding only in pushing it aside with her bow wave. Nakagawa then ordered I-37′s crew to open fire on the survivors. I-37 fired first at the raft, inflicting no casualties on its occupants, and then spent an hour moving systematically through the area, her crew machine-gunning every man floating in a life jacket they could find while calling for Sutlej′s master and chief engineer to give themselves up. Sources disagree on Sutlej′s death toll in the sinking and subsequent massacre, claiming that 43 men died immediately and two more while the remaining survivors drifted at sea, and that s total of 41 crew members and nine gunners from Sutlej perished before her survivors were rescued. The Royal Navy whaler HMS Solvra rescued ten crewmen and a gunner after they spent 42 days on a life raft, and the Royal Navy sloop-of-war HMS Flamingo rescued 11 crewmen and a gunner after they had drifted at sea for 46 days.

At 11:30 on 29 February 1944, the submerged I-37 fired two torpedoes at the British 7,005-gross register ton armed cargo steamer SS Ascot — carrying a 9,000-ton general cargo of pig iron, paraffin wax, gunnies, linseed oil, coconuts, and fiber and, according to different sources, making a voyage either from Calcutta in British India to Port Louis, Mauritius, or from Colombo, Ceylon, to Diego Suarez, Madagascar, and then to Fremantle — in the Indian Ocean 800 nautical miles (1,500 km; 920 mi) northwest of Diego Suarez. Madagascar. One hit Ascot in the forward part of her engine room in her starboard side, killing four crewmen, knocking down both of her transmitter aerials, destroying two of her lifeboats, and bringing her to a stop at 05°S 063°E. Ascot′s 52 survivors abandoned ship in the two remaining lifeboats and a life raft. I-37 surfaced 2,000 yards (1,800 m) off Ascot′s starboard quarter, circled her once, and fired at Ascot with her deck gun for about 15 minutes, scoring no hits. She then approached the lifeboats and raft, her medical officer calling in English for Ascot′s master, chief officer, and wireless operator to identify themselves. After the men aboard one of the boats responded falsely that all three of them were dead, following instructions given to all Allied merchant ship crews, I-37 fired warning shots across the bow of the other boat, prompting her master, Captain Jack Travis, to identify himself. I-37′s crew brought him aboard the submarine and ordered him to identify his first officer, brought the first officer aboard as well to confirm Travis's identity, and then returned the chief officer to his lifeboat. Nakagawa then screamed "English swine!" at Travis, slashed him across the palms of his hands with his sword, and shoved him overboard. Travis reached a lifeboat, but I-37 rammed both lifeboats, spilling their occupants into the sea, and spent the next two hours methodically moving around the boats, machine-gunning men in the water and aboard the raft, killing many of them and sinking one lifeboat. I-37 then opened fire with her deck gun on the slowly sinking Ascot, firing 30 rounds into her and setting her on fire; she eventually sank. I-37 then resumed her attack on the survivors, ramming the raft and spending another two hours machine-gunning every Ascot survivor her crew could find before she took the remaining lifeboat under tow and finally departed the scene at 20:00, taking the lifeboat with her. Ascot′s last seven survivors — four crewmen and three gunners — climbed back aboard the raft, from which the Dutch steamer or motor vessel (according to different sources) Straat Soenda rescued them on 3 March 1944.

On 3 March 1944, I-37 launched her floatplane for an armed reconnaissance flight over the Chagos Archipelago, carrying two 60-kilogram (132 lb) bombs. Its crew sighted no ships during the flight and jettisoned the bombs into the sea before returning to I-37. I-37 then set course for Diego Suarez. Along the way, at 23:00 on 9 March she stopped an Indian junk making a voyage from Colombo, Ceylon, to Cape Town, South Africa, allowing it to proceed after discovering about 100 women and children were aboard. She was 150 nautical miles (278 km; 173 mi) northeast of Diego Suarez after 17:00 on 14 March when she detected the sounds of destroyer propellers, but Nakagawa decided against attempting an attack in order to carry out a reconnaissance flight over Diego Suarez scheduled for the next day. After sunset on 15 March, her floatplane made the flight, its crew reporting an aircraft carrier, two heavy cruisers, and three destroyers in the harbor.

I-37 next made for Mombasa to conduct another reconnaissance flight. While she was en route, she sighted three unescorted Allied merchant ships — one each on 18 March, 22 March, and 1 April 1944 — but each time Nakagawa decided against an attack. She arrived in her launch area south of Mombasa and 50 nautical miles (93 km; 58 mi) northeast of Pemba Island on the afternoon of 5 April, but found a heavy swell in the area that prevented the launch of the floatplane. When weather conditions deteriorated further after midnight, the flight was postponed. Although bad weather persisted on 7 April, her plane made its flight that night, its crew reporting more than 60 merchant ships in the harbor at Mombasa. After recovering her plane, I-37 set course for Penang, passing 5 nautical miles (9.3 km; 5.8 mi) south of Ceylon on 10 April and arriving at Penang at 04:30 on 20 April 1944. Since being taken prisoner on 22 February, British Chivalry′s Captain Hill had refused to answer his captors' questions aboard I-37 and I-37′s crew had occasionally taken him out on deck blindfolded and with his hands tied behind his back, threatening to shove him overboard. After I-37 arrived at Penang, he was placed on a starvation diet as punishment for taking up arms against the emperor of Japan, but after the Allies freed him at the end of the war, he refused to provide evidence against the Japanese.

=== April–October 1944 ===
Escorted by her floatplane, I-37 departed Penang at 05:00 on 27 April 1944 bound for Singapore. Around 08:00, when she was about 20 nautical miles (37 km; 23 mi) south of Penang, an explosion occurred about 110 yards (100 m) off her port bow, apparently the premature detonation of a naval mine laid either by a B-24 Liberator heavy bomber of the 7th Bombardment Group of the United States Army Air Force′s Tenth Air Force or by the Royal Navy submarine HMS Taurus. The explosion rocked I-37, knocking out her lights and short-circuiting an electric switchboard. I-37 settled on the seabed in shallow water, then returned to Penang by the morning of 28 April. An inspection at Penang revealed damage to the valves of two ballast tanks on I-37′s port side. She again departed Penang on 3 May 1944, this time arriving safely at Singapore on 5 May and undergoing repairs at Seletar. On 10 May, I-37 received a new commanding officer, Nakagawa moving to a new assignment. In January 1947, he pleaded guilty before an American military court in Yokohama for the war crimes he committed while in command of I-37 and was sentenced to seven years in prison with hard labor.

After completion of her repairs, I-37 served as an antisubmarine warfare target in the anchorage at Lingga Island off Sumatra for ships of the 2nd Fleet between 09:00 and 13:30 Japan Standard Time on 21 July 1944. On 9 September 1944, she arrived at Kure, Japan, for a refit and modifications involving the removal of her hangar, aircraft catapult, and deck gun and the installation of fittings for her to carry four kaiten manned suicide torpedoes.

=== First kaiten mission ===
On 7 November 1944, the commander of the 6th Fleet, Vice Admiral Shigeyoshi Miwa, advised crews at the kaiten base at Otsu Island in Tokuyama Bay on the coast of Japan of the plan for Operation Kikusui ("Floating Chrysanthemum"), in which I-37 and the submarines I-36 and I-47 were to launch kaiten attacks on the Allied naval anchorages at Ulithi Atoll and at Kossol Roads at Palau. Assigned to the Palau attack, I-37 embarked four kaitens and their pilots for the operation, and all three submarines departed the Otsu Island base on 8 November 1944. The plan called for I-37 to launch her kaitens off Kossol Roads on the evening of 19 November 1944.

=== Loss ===
At 08:58 on 19 November 1944, the U.S. Navy netlayer USS Winterberry was laying a torpedo net across the western entrance to Kossol Roads when she sighted I-37 off the entrance. I-37 submerged, but 20 seconds later surfaced at a steep angle before submerging for a second time. Winterberry alerted the port director of Kossol Passage and the minesweeper USS YMS-33 of the sighting. YMS-33 commenced a search for I-37 but failed to detect her. At 0915, the destroyer escorts USS Conklin and USS McCoy Reynolds received orders to find and sink I-37, and U.S. Navy planes took off from nearby Peleliu to assist. The two destroyer escorts began a sonar search.

At about 15:04 both Conklin and McCoy Reynolds obtained a sound contact, and at 15:39 McCoy Reynolds began her first attack, firing two patterns of Hedgehog antisubmarine projectiles. I-37 descended to a depth of 350 feet (107 m) and began evasive maneuvers. McCoy Reynolds launched two more Hedgehog barrages before losing contact, by which time I-37 was at a depth of at least 400 feet (122 m).

Conklin gained contact on I-37 at 16:03 and began her first Hedgehog attack at 16:15. Twenty-five seconds after she fired her Hedgehog barrage, her crew heard a single underwater explosion. Ten minutes later, Conklin fired a second Hedgehog pattern, and her crew heard another explosion 28 seconds later. Although each explosion indicated a hit, I-37 continued to maneuver, spoiling Conklin′s third Hedgehog attack by turning inside it, resulting in no hits.

At 16:45, McCoy Reynolds dropped a pattern of 12 depth charges set to explode at a depth of 450 feet (137 m). Her crew saw an air bubble about 25 feet (7.6 m) in diameter rise to at least 5 feet (1.5 m) above the surface, then heard a heavy underwater explosion. McCoy Reynolds lost contact with I-37 and had just regained it when at 17:00 a massive underwater explosion rocked McCoy Reynolds, temporarily disabling her sound gear. At 17:01, a huge air bubble reached the surface on her starboard bow at 08°07′N 134°16′E. Several smaller explosions followed, and neither destroyer escort gained any further contact on I-37. Debris and oil reached the surface in sudden gushes over a large area around both ships. By sunset, a whaleboat from McCoy Reynolds had retrieved wood stenciled with Japanese characters, polished pieces of instrument cases, deck planking, and a piece of human flesh with bits of steel embedded in it from the water, and by the time darkness fell an oil slick extended over several square miles as additional debris came to the surface, marking the demise of I-37.

On 6 December 1944, the Imperial Japanese Navy declared I-37 to be presumed lost off Palau with all 113 hands. The Japanese removed her from the Navy list on 10 March 1945.
