= Japanese submarine Ro-108 =

- Ro-108, I-180, and Ro-101 (L to R) anchored in Rabaul, 9 September 1943

History

Japan
- Name: Submarine No. 218
- Builder: Kawasaki, Kobe, Japan
- Laid down: 20 April 1942
- Renamed: Ro-108 on 25 September 1942
- Launched: 26 October 1942
- Completed: 20 April 1943
- Commissioned: 20 April 1943
- Fate: Sunk 26 May 1944
- Stricken: 10 August 1944

General characteristics
- Class & type: Ro-100-class submarine
- Displacement: 611 tonnes (601 long tons) surfaced; 795 tonnes (782 long tons) submerged
- Length: 60.90 m (199 ft 10 in) overall
- Beam: 6.00 m (19 ft 8 in)
- Draft: 3.51 m (11 ft 6 in)
- Installed power: 1,000 bhp (750 kW) (diesel); 760 hp (570 kW) (electric motor)
- Propulsion: Diesel-electric; 1 × diesel engine; 1 × electric motor
- Speed: 14.2 knots (26.3 km/h; 16.3 mph) surfaced; 8 knots (15 km/h; 9.2 mph) submerged
- Range: 3,500 nmi (6,500 km; 4,000 mi) at 12 knots (22 km/h; 14 mph) surfaced; 60 nmi (110 km; 69 mi) at 3 knots (5.6 km/h; 3.5 mph) submerged
- Test depth: 75 m (246 ft)
- Crew: 38
- Armament: 4 × bow 533 mm (21 in) torpedo tubes; 2 × 25 mm (1 in) Type 96 anti-aircraft guns or 1 × 76.2 mm (3.00 in) L/40 AA gun

Ro-108 was an Imperial Japanese Navy Ro-100-class submarine. Completed and commissioned in April 1943, she served in World War II, operating in the Solomon Islands campaign, the New Guinea campaign — during which she sank the United States Navy destroyer USS Henley (DD-391) — and off the Admiralty Islands. She was sunk in May 1944 during her fifth war patrol.

== Design and description ==
The Ro-100 class was a medium-sized, coastal submarine derived from the preceding Kaichū type. They displaced 611 tonnes (601 long tons) surfaced and 795 tonnes (782 long tons) submerged. The submarines were 60.9 meters (199 ft 10 in) long, had a beam of 6 meters (19 ft 8 in) and a draft of 3.51 meters (11 ft 6 in). They had a double hull and a diving depth of 75 meters (246 ft).

For surface running, the boats were powered by two 500-brake-horsepower (373 kW) diesel engines, each driving one propeller shaft. When submerged, each propeller was driven by a 380-horsepower (283 kW) electric motor. They could reach 14.2 knots (26.3 km/h; 16.3 mph) on the surface and 8 knots (15 km/h; 9.2 mph) underwater. On the surface, the Ro-100s had a range of 3,500 nautical miles (6,500 km; 4,000 mi) at 12 knots (22 km/h; 14 mph); submerged, they had a range of 60 nmi (110 km; 69 mi) at 3 knots (5.6 km/h; 3.5 mph).

The boats were armed with four internal bow 53.3 cm (21.0 in) torpedo tubes and carried a total of eight torpedoes. They were also armed with two single mounts for 25 mm (1 in) Type 96 anti-aircraft guns or a single 76.2 mm (3.00 in) L/40 AA gun.

== Construction and commissioning ==
Ro-108 was laid down as Submarine No. 218 on 20 April 1942 by Kawasaki at Kobe, Japan. Renamed Ro-108 on 25 September 1942, she was launched on 26 October 1942. She was completed and commissioned on 20 April 1943.

== Service history ==
Upon commissioning, Ro-108 was attached to the Sasebo Naval District and was assigned to the Kure Submarine Squadron for workups. On 1 August 1943, she was reassigned to Submarine Squadron 7 in the 8th Fleet in the Southeast Area Fleet. She departed Yokosuka, Japan, on 11 August 1943, bound for Rabaul on New Britain, which she reached on 16 August 1943.

=== First war patrol ===
Ro-108 got underway from Rabaul on 23 August 1943 for her first war patrol, assigned a patrol area southeast of San Cristobal in the Solomon Islands. While at sea, she was reassigned to Submarine Division 51 on 1 September 1943. Her patrol was otherwise uneventful, and she returned to Rabaul on 16 September 1943.

=== New Guinea campaign ===
==== Second war patrol ====
Ro-108 put to sea to begin her second war patrol on 23 September 1943, bound for a patrol area off Finschhafen, New Guinea. On 30 September 1943, she sighted an Allied convoy, but was unable to reach a position from which to attack it.

Just after sundown on 3 October 1943, Ro-108 was patrolling in the Huon Gulf 30 nautical miles (56 km; 35 mi) off Morobe, New Guinea, when her sound operator detected the propeller noises and sonar pings of the United States Navy destroyers USS Henley (DD-391), USS Reid (DD-369), and USS Smith (DD-378), which were conducting an antisubmarine sweep in the area. She avoided detection and reached an attack position, and at about 18:12, she fired four torpedoes at the destroyers, which presented overlapping targets. Smith sighted the wakes of three of the torpedoes and made a sharp turn to "comb" them; one of them passed her 500 yards (460 m) to port and another 200 yards (180 m) to starboard. Henley avoided two torpedoes, but a third torpedo struck her on her port side in her No. 1 fire room, destroying her boilers and breaking her keel. Henley′s crew abandoned ship, and at 18:29 she broke in half and sank by the stern at 07°40′S 148°06′E with the loss of 15 lives. Fifty-two of her survivors were injured.

Although Reid and Smith counterattacked over the next seven hours, Ro-108 escaped. She returned to Rabaul on 11 October 1943 and erroneously received credit for sinking two destroyers.

==== October–December 1943 ====
While Ro-108 was anchored at Rabaul, the United States Army Air Forces Fifth Air Force and the Royal Australian Air Force combined on 12 October 1943 to stage the largest Allied air raid of the Pacific War up to that time, with 349 aircraft based in New Guinea and Australia hitting Japanese airfields around Rabaul and shipping in Simpson Harbour at Rabaul. Ro-108 and the submarines I-36, I-38, I-176, I-177, and Ro-105 were in the harbor during the air raid, and most of them submerged to avoid attack. Ro-108 avoided damage during the raid.

On 23 October 1943, Ro-108 departed Rabaul to carry supplies to Sarmi on the northern coast of New Guinea in support of Japanese forces fighting in the New Guinea campaign. She reached Sarmi on 24 October 1943, unloaded her cargo, and got underway again that same night. While heading back to Rabaul, she received orders on 26 October 1943 to patrol off Lae, New Guinea. She returned to Rabaul on 9 November 1943.

Ro-108 got underway from Rabaul on 20 November 1943 for a second supply run to Sarmi. After delivering her cargo at Sarmi on 21 November 1943, she patrolled off New Britain in the Arawe-Cape Merkus area before returning to Rabaul on 9 December 1943.

On 14 December 1943, Ro-108 put to sea from Rabaul for another supply voyage to Sarmi. Before reaching Sarmi, she was on the surface recharging her batteries in the Bismarck Sea northeast of Long Island at around 01:14 on 17 December 1943 when a PBY-5A Catalina flying boat of U.S. Navy Patrol Squadron 52 (VP-52) attacked her. The plane's crew reported seeing Ro-108 sinking by the stern and claimed to have sunk her — some historians have credited the plane with sinking the submarine I-179, although I-179 had sunk in a diving accident off Japan in July 1943 — but Ro-108 survived the attack, albeit with serious damage that forced her to abandon her supply mission. After calling at Rabaul, she got back underway on 20 December 1943, bound for Japan, where she arrived at Sasebo on 1 January 1944 to undergo repairs.

=== Third and fourth war patrols ===
After the completion of her repairs, Ro-108 departed Sasebo on 7 March 1944 bound for Truk, which she reached on 16 March 1944. She departed Truk on 18 March 1944 to begin her third war patrol, assigned a patrol area north of the Admiralty Islands, and while at sea on 20 March 1944 was assigned to Patrol Unit A. After an otherwise quiet patrol, she returned to Truk on 29 March 1944. She again got underway from Truk on 12 April 1944, setting out on her fourth war patrol, this time south of the Admiralties. Her patrol again was uneventful, and she concluded it with her arrival at Truk on 3 May 1944.

=== Fifth war patrol ===
Ro-108 got underway from Truk on 16 May 1944 for her fifth war patrol, ordered to join the submarines Ro-104, Ro-105, Ro-106, Ro-109, Ro-112, and Ro-116 in forming a submarine picket line north of the Admiralty Islands designated Scouting Line NA. The picket line was tasked with providing a warning of any move toward the Palau Islands by Allied invasion forces.

On 18 May 1944, U.S. Navy signals intelligence personnel intercepted and decrypted Japanese signals indicating the formation of Scouting Line NA between Truk and the Admiralties. A U.S. Navy hunter-killer group composed of the destroyer escorts USS England (DE-635), USS George (DE-697), and USS Raby (DE-698) departed Purvis Bay in the Solomon Islands to intercept the submarine I-16, then attack the submarines assigned to Scouting Line NA. After England sank I-16 on 19 May 1944, the hunter-killer group turned its attention to Scouting Line NA and had successes against the line when England sank Ro-106 on 22 May 1944, Ro-104 on 23 May 1944, and Ro-116 on 24 May 1944.

=== Loss ===
Ro-108 was on the surface 110 nautical miles (200 km; 130 mi) northeast of Seeadler Harbor on Manus Island heading northeast at 11 knots (20 km/h; 13 mph) at 23:03 Lima Time on 26 May 1944 when Raby established radar contact on her at a range of 15,000 yards (13,700 m). Shortly thereafter, England also detected Ro-108 on radar, and the two destroyer escorts closed the range. When England had closed to 4,100 yards (3,700 m), Ro-108 crash-dived. England established sonar contact on her at 23:19 at a range of 1,650 yards (1,510 m) and Raby made an unsuccessful attack against Ro-108, which was at a depth of 250 feet (76 m) and making 2 to 3 knots (3.7 to 5.6 km/h; 2.3 to 3.5 mph) on a heading of 150 degrees true. At 23:23, England attacked with a 24-projectile Hedgehog barrage. Four to six explosions followed 11 seconds later, indicating hits on Ro-108. Subsequently, England′s crew witnessed several underwater explosions and heard rumbling noises, marking the sinking of Ro-108 with all hands. By the morning of 27 May 1944, diesel oil and debris had risen to the surface at 00°32′S 148°35′E.

Ro-108 was the fifth of six Japanese submarines England sank over 13-days in May 1944: She previously had sunk I-16 on 19 May, Ro-106 on 22 May, Ro-104 on 23 May, and Ro-116 on 24 May, and she went on to sink Ro-105 on 31 May.

On 25 June 1944, the Imperial Japanese Navy declared Ro-108 to be presumed lost with all 53 men on board. The Japanese struck her from the Navy list on 10 August 1944.
