= USS England (DE-635) =

Buckley-class destroyer escort

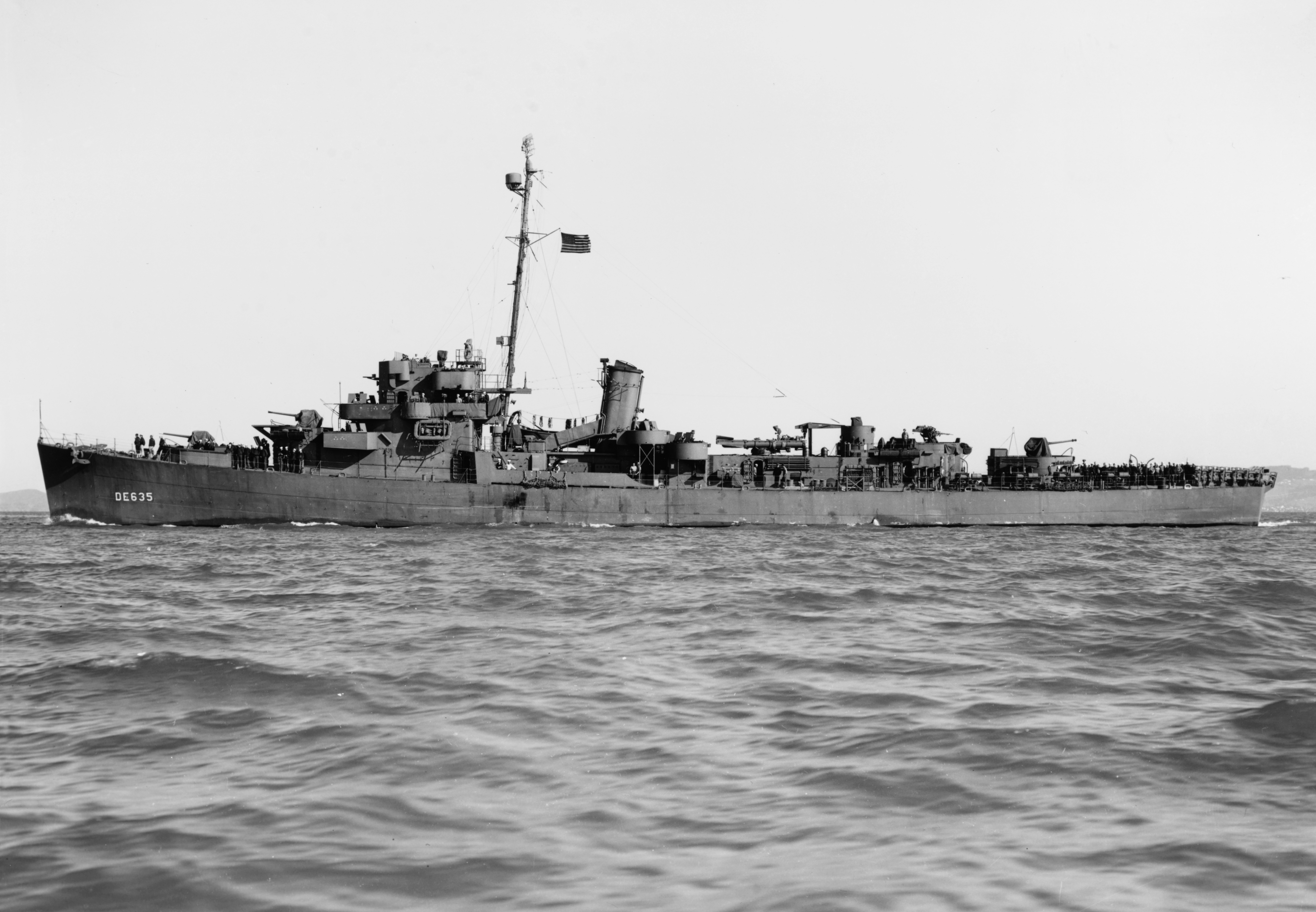
- USS England off San Francisco, 9 February 1944

History

United States
- Name: USS England
- Namesake: Ensign John C. England
- Builder: Bethlehem Shipbuilding Corporation
- Laid down: 4 April 1943
- Launched: 26 September 1943
- Commissioned: 10 December 1943
- Decommissioned: 15 October 1945
- Stricken: 1 November 1945
- Honors and awards: 10 battle stars & Presidential Unit Citation (World War II)
- Fate: Sold and broken up, 26 November 1946

General characteristics
- Class & type: Buckley-class destroyer escort
- Displacement: 1,400 long tons (1,422 t) standard; 1,740 long tons (1,768 t) full load
- Length: 306 ft (93 m)
- Beam: 37 ft (11 m)
- Draft: 9 ft 6 in (2.90 m) standard; 11 ft 3 in (3.43 m) full load
- Installed power: 2 × boilers; 12,000 shp (8.9 MW)
- Propulsion: 2 × propellers; General Electric turbo-electric drive
- Speed: 23 knots (43 km/h; 26 mph)
- Range: 3,700 nmi (6,900 km; 4,300 mi) at 15 kn (28 km/h; 17 mph)
- Complement: 15 officers, 198 men
- Armament: 3 × 3"/50 caliber guns; 1 × quad 1.1"/75 caliber gun; 8 × single 20 mm guns; 1 × triple 21 inch (533 mm) torpedo tubes; 1 × Hedgehog anti-submarine mortar array; 8 × K-gun depth charge projectors; 2 × depth charge racks

USS England (DE-635), a Buckley-class destroyer escort of the United States Navy, was named in honor of Ensign John C. England (1920–1941), who was killed in action aboard the battleship Oklahoma during the Japanese attack on Pearl Harbor on 7 December 1941. Her sinking of six Japanese submarines in twelve days is a feat unparalleled in the history of anti-submarine warfare.

== Construction and commissioning ==
England was launched on 26 September 1943 at the Bethlehem Shipbuilding Corporation shipyard in San Francisco, California, sponsored by Mrs. H. B. England, mother of Ensign England; and commissioned on 10 December 1943.

== Operational history ==
England arrived at Espiritu Santo on 12 March 1944 from San Francisco, Pearl Harbor, Funafuti, and Guadalcanal. She took up escort duty between Espiritu Santo and Guadalcanal, occasionally sailing to Nouméa, and once to the Marshalls.

=== Anti-submarine record ===
==== I-16 ====
Fleet Radio Unit Pacific (FRUPAC) intercepted and decoded a 13 May 1944 message from I-16 including a scheduled delivery of rice for Japanese troops at Buin on the southern tip of Bougainville Island. Escort Division 39 (Cdr H. Plains commanding), comprising USS George and USS Raby along with England of Escort Division 40, were ordered to intercept I-16 and departed Purvis Bay on the afternoon of 18 May 1944. On the morning of 19 May, an American patrol aircraft spotted I-16 on the surface and made a contact report. Alerted, England, Raby and George conducted a line-abreast sonar sweep. At 13:35, England detected I-16 with sonar. Her first Hedgehog mortar attack at 13:41 missed, but a second Hedgehog attack scored one hit at a depth of 130 feet (40 m). A third Hedgehog attack at 14:10 missed because depth was assumed to be 200 feet (61 m) rather than the 325 feet (99 m) revealed by the fathometer following the attack. I-16 outmaneuvered a fourth Hedgehog attack. The fifth Hedgehog attack at 14:33 resulted in four to six detonations and was followed by a large underwater explosion which lifted England's fantail and knocked men off their feet. Debris began floating to the surface twenty minutes later and the following day there was a 3-by-6-nautical-mile (3.5 by 6.9 mi; 5.6 by 11.1 km) oil slick.

==== Ro-106 ====
A 20 May 1944 message was decoded revealing Japanese plans for a submarine trap north of the Admiralty Islands to intercept an anticipated movement of United States aircraft carriers. Ro-104, Ro-105, Ro-106, Ro-108, Ro-109, Ro-112, and Ro-116 of the Japanese Seventh Submarine Squadron formed a patrol line across a route Admiral Halsey had used twice before. George detected Ro-106 on radar at 03:50 on 22 May, saw the submarine dive when located by searchlight, and missed with a Hedgehog attack at 04:15. England regained contact at 04:25, missed with one Hedgehog attack, and scored at least three detonations on a second attack at 05:01. A large underwater explosion was detected as England prepared to conduct a third attack, and a heavy oil slick with debris was evident after sunrise.

==== Ro-104 ====
The three destroyer escorts formed a search line with a scouting interval of 16,000 yards during hours of darkness. Raby detected Ro-104 on radar at 06:00 on 23 May, made sonar contact at 06:10 but missed with four Hedgehog attacks beginning at 06:17. George missed with another Hedgehog attack at 07:17, then missed with another four more Hedgehog attacks between 07:30 and 08:10. England missed with a first Hedgehog attack and scored an estimated ten or twelve detonations on a second Hedgehog attack at 08:34. The hits were followed by noises of the submarine breaking up and a large underwater explosion three minutes later. Debris and oil appeared on the surface at 10:45.

==== Ro-116 ====
George detected Ro-116 on radar at 01:20 24 May. England made sonar contact at 01:50 and scored three to five detonations on the first Hedgehog attack at 02:14. Breaking-up noises were not followed by the major explosions noted on earlier sinkings. A small quantity of oil and debris was evident after sunrise at 07:02 and the oil slick had expanded to cover several square miles the following day. On 25 June 1944, the Imperial Japanese Navy declared Ro-116 to be lost north of the Admiralty Islands with all 56 crew.

==== Ro-108 ====
A hunter-killer group consisting of the escort carrier Hoggatt Bay (CVE-75) with destroyers Hazelwood (DD-531), Heermann (DD-532), Hoel (DD-533), and McCord (DD-534) arrived on 26 May so the three destroyer escorts could leave to refuel and rearm. The destroyer escorts maintained their search formation en route to Manus. Raby detected Ro-108 on radar at 23:03 26 May. England made radar contact at 23:04, sonar contact at 23:18, and scored four to six detonations with the first Hedgehog attack. There was no major explosion following the breaking-up noises, but a fountain of oil was observed rising to the surface at dawn.

==== Ro-105 ====
The three destroyer escorts reached Manus at 1500 on 27 May. After taking on fuel, provisions, and ammunition, they sailed at 18:00 28 May with Spangler (DE-696) to rejoin the search. Hazelwood detected Ro-105 on radar at 01:56 on 30 May and missed with a depth charge attack. George and Raby joined Hazelwood and made a total of sixteen Hedgehog and depth charge attacks over a period of 25 hours. RO-105 surfaced at 03:10 on 31 May and was immediately detected by George and Raby. RO-105 stayed directly between the two destroyer escorts for five minutes before submerging so neither Raby nor George could fire without endangering the other. Sequential Hedgehog attacks were then made by Raby, George, Raby, and Spangler. All missed. Division Commander Hains then radioed, "Oh, hell. Go ahead, England." England then scored six to ten detonations in a Hedgehog attack at 07:36. A major explosion followed at 07:41 and oil and debris appeared on the surface.

This anti-submarine warfare performance was never matched in World War II and won for England a Presidential Unit Citation and the assurance from the Chief of Naval Operations, Admiral E. J. King, "There'll always be an England in the United States Navy." His pledge was fulfilled on 6 October 1960, when DLG-22 was assigned the name England.

=== Subsequent service ===
Through the summer of 1944, England sailed throughout the northern Solomons, providing the escort services necessary for the building up of bases, preparations for the renewed assaults on Japanese territories to the north, and provision of supplies to garrison forces on the islands of the southwest Pacific. On 1 August she ran aground at Seeadler Harbor, Manus, Admiralty Islands; she underwent repairs at Manus, and between 24 September and 15 October, then voyaged from the Treasury Islands to Sydney, Australia. From the Treasuries, she sailed guarding a convoy to Hollandia, where she arrived on 18 October, and on 26 October got underway on the first of two voyages to escort reinforcement convoys to newly invaded Leyte. She returned to Manus and local escort duty on 2 December.

From 2 January 1945, England escorted convoys between Manus and Ulithi, the major base for operations of the carrier task forces, and later to be the staging point for the assaults on Iwo Jima and Okinawa. The escort vessel sailed to Kossol Roads in February, bringing in a convoy later routed on to the Philippines, then resumed her duty on the Manus-Ulithi sea lanes. She sailed from Ulithi on 23 March, as part of Task Force 54 (TF 54), for the pre-invasion bombardment of Okinawa, returned to Ulithi to join the screen of two cruisers, guarding them back to Okinawa to join the 5th Fleet just after the initial assault on 1 April. Between 6 and 17 April, she voyaged to Saipan screening unladen transports, then took up a screening and patrol station north of the Kerama Retto.

On 9 May 1945, while on station, England was attacked by three Japanese dive bombers. Her anti-aircraft fire set the first of these aflame, but the plane crashed into England on her starboard side, just below the bridge. When the plane's bomb exploded just after the crash, England's men raced to quench the fires and save their ship, while the combat air patrol shot down the two other aircraft. England was able to make Kerama Retto under tow, with 37 of her men killed or missing and 25 wounded.

England sailed on to Leyte, where she received temporary repairs to put her in shape for the long voyage home. On 16 July 1945 she arrived at Philadelphia for permanent repairs and conversion to a High-speed transport. The end of the war, however, halted this work. Because of her extensive damage and a surplus of ships of her type, it was decided not to repair her. She was decommissioned on 15 October 1945 and sold for scrapping on 26 November 1946.

== Awards ==
- Presidential Unit Citation
- Asiatic-Pacific Campaign Medal with 10 battle stars
- World War II Victory Medal
