= Japanese submarine Ro-109 =

Submarine in the Imperial Japanese Navy (WW2)

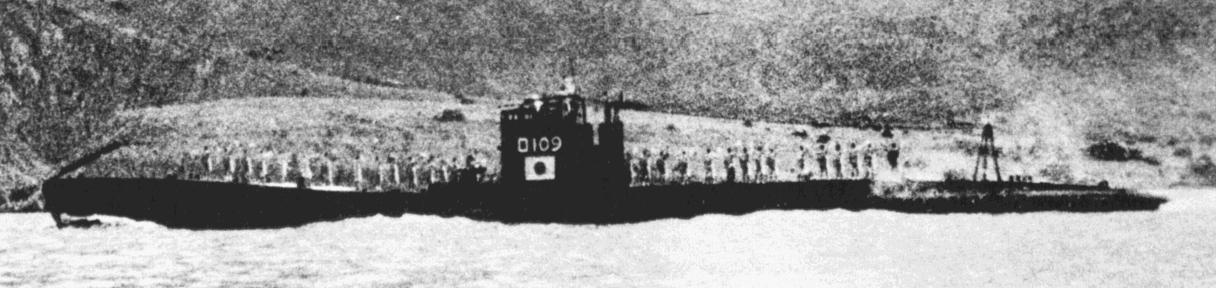

History

Japan
- Name: Submarine No. 400
- Builder: Kawasaki, Kobe, Japan
- Laid down: 20 April 1942
- Renamed: Ro-109 on 20 August 1942
- Launched: 26 October 1942
- Completed: 30 April 1943
- Commissioned: 30 April 1943
- Fate: Sunk 25 April 1945
- Stricken: 10 June 1945

General characteristics
- Class & type: Ro-100-class submarine
- Displacement: 611 tonnes (601 long tons) surfaced; 795 tonnes (782 long tons) submerged
- Length: 60.90 m (199 ft 10 in) overall
- Beam: 6.00 m (19 ft 8 in)
- Draft: 3.51 m (11 ft 6 in)
- Installed power: 1,000 bhp (750 kW) (diesel); 760 hp (570 kW) (electric motor)
- Propulsion: Diesel-electric; 1 × diesel engine; 1 × electric motor
- Speed: 14.2 knots (26.3 km/h; 16.3 mph) surfaced; 8 knots (15 km/h; 9.2 mph) submerged
- Range: 3,500 nmi (6,500 km; 4,000 mi) at 12 knots (22 km/h; 14 mph) surfaced; 60 nmi (110 km; 69 mi) at 3 knots (5.6 km/h; 3.5 mph) submerged
- Test depth: 75 m (246 ft)
- Crew: 38
- Armament: 4 × bow 533 mm (21 in) torpedo tubes; 2 × 25 mm (1 in) Type 96 anti-aircraft guns or 1 × 76.2 mm (3.00 in) L/40 AA gun

Ro-109 was an Imperial Japanese Navy Ro-100-class submarine. Completed and commissioned in April 1943, she served in World War II, operating off the Solomon Islands, New Guinea, the Admiralty Islands, Truk, the Philippine Islands, and Okinawa. She was sunk in April 1945 during her tenth war patrol.

== Design and description ==
The Ro-100 class was a medium-sized, coastal submarine derived from the preceding Kaichū type. They displaced 611 tonnes (601 long tons) surfaced and 795 tonnes (782 long tons) submerged. The submarines were 60.9 meters (199 ft 10 in) long, had a beam of 6 meters (19 ft 8 in) and a draft of 3.51 meters (11 ft 6 in). They had a double hull and a diving depth of 75 meters (246 ft).

For surface running, the boats were powered by two 500-brake-horsepower (373 kW) diesel engines, each driving one propeller shaft. When submerged each propeller was driven by a 380-horsepower (283 kW) electric motor. They could reach 14.2 knots (26.3 km/h; 16.3 mph) on the surface and 8 knots (15 km/h; 9.2 mph) underwater. On the surface, the Ro-100s had a range of 3,500 nautical miles (6,500 km; 4,000 mi) at 12 knots (22 km/h; 14 mph); submerged, they had a range of 60 nmi (110 km; 69 mi) at 3 knots (5.6 km/h; 3.5 mph).

The boats were armed with four internal bow 53.3 cm (21.0 in) torpedo tubes and carried a total of eight torpedoes. They were also armed with two single mounts for 25 mm (1 in) Type 96 anti-aircraft guns or a single 76.2 mm (3.00 in) L/40 AA gun.

== Construction and commissioning ==
Ro-109 was laid down as Submarine No. 400 on 20 April 1942 by Kawasaki at Kobe, Japan. Renamed Ro-109 on 20 August 1942, she was launched on 26 October 1942. She was completed and commissioned on 30 April 1943.

== Service history ==
Upon commissioning, Ro-109 was attached to the Sasebo Naval District and was assigned to Submarine Squadron 11 for workups. She departed Sasebo, Japan, on 14 August 1943 bound for Rabaul on New Britain, and during her voyage was reassigned to Submarine Squadron 7 in the 8th Fleet in the Southeast Area Fleet on 15 August 1943. She reached Rabaul on 24 August 1943. During her stay there, she was assigned to Submarine Division 51 in Submarine Squadron 7 on 1 September 1943.

=== First war patrol ===
Ro-109 got underway from Rabaul on 9 September 1943 for her first war patrol, assigned a patrol area south of Guadalcanal in the Solomon Islands. The patrol was uneventful, and she returned to Rabaul on 2 October 1943.

=== New Guinea campaign, October 1943 ===
On 13 October 1943, Ro-109 departed Rabaul to transport supplies to Sarmi, New Guinea, in support of Japanese forces fighting in the New Guinea campaign. She arrived at Sarmi on 14 October, unloaded her cargo, and got back underway for her return voyage to Rabaul. However, she received orders to first perform lifeguard duty on 15 and 16 October 1943 for the crews of Mitsubishi G4M (Allied reporting name "Betty") bombers shot down off New Guinea, but she found no survivors. She then received new orders to patrol off Lae, New Guinea, where on 19 October 1943 the United States Navy destroyers USS Reid (DD-369) and USS Perkins (DD-377) detected and pursued her and Perkins attacked her with depth charges. Ro-109 escaped damage and counterattacked, firing a spread of torpedoes at the destroyer USS Drayton (DD-366), but scored no hits. She returned to Rabaul on 31 October 1943.

=== Second and third war patrols ===
Ro-109 put to sea to begin her second war patrol on 8 November 1943, bound for a patrol area in the northern Solomon Islands off Bougainville, where the Bougainville campaign had begun on 1 November 1943. After a quiet patrol, she returned to Rabaul on 24 November 1943 On 3 December 1943, she left Rabaul for her third war patrol, again in the Bougainville area, and again found no targets. She returned to Rabaul on 9 December 1943.

=== New Guinea campaign, December 1943–March 1944 ===
Ro-108 got underway from Rabaul on 13 December 1943 for a supply run to Buin, New Guinea. She delivered her cargo at Buin on 16 December 1943 and headed back for Rabaul, where she arrived on 19 December 1943. Two more Buin supply runs followed, seeing her depart Rabaul on 23 December 1943, discharge her cargo at Buin on 26 December, and return to Rabaul on 30 December 1943, then put back to sea on 24 January 1944, call at Buin on 28 January, and arrive at Rabaul on 31 January 1944.

On 7 February 1944, Ro-109 left Rabaul on a supply run to Sarmi, where she unloaded cargo on 9 February before returning to Rabaul on 11 February 1944. She got back underway from Rabaul on 20 February 1944, paused at New Hanover Island, called at Truk from 25 to 26 February 1944 and at Saipan in the Mariana Islands on 3 March 1944, and then set course the same day for Japan. She arrived at Sasebo on 11 March 1944 for repairs.

=== Fourth war patrol ===
After the completion of her repairs, Ro-109 departed Sasebo on 13 April 1944 bound for Saipan, which she reached on 20 April 1944. She departed Saipan on 22 April 1944 to begin her third war patrol, assigned a patrol area north of New Guinea, and on 29 April 1944 joined Patrol Unit B southeast of Woleai′s Mereyon Island. After a quiet patrol, she returned to Saipan on 8 May 1944.

=== Fifth war patrol ===
Ro-109 got underway from Saipan on 16 May 1944 for her fifth war patrol, ordered to join the submarines Ro-104, Ro-105, Ro-106, Ro-108, Ro-112, and Ro-116 in forming a submarine picket line north of the Admiralty Islands designated Scouting Line NA. The picket line was tasked with providing warning of any move toward the Palau Islands by Allied invasion forces.

On 18 May 1944, U.S. Navy signals intelligence personnel intercepted and decrypted Japanese signals indicating the formation of Scouting Line NA between Truk and the Admiralties. A U.S. Navy hunter-killer group composed of the destroyer escorts USS England (DE-635), USS George (DE-697), and USS Raby (DE-698) departed Purvis Bay in the Solomon Islands to attack the submarines involved. The hunter-killer group had great success, sinking several of the submarines. When the Japanese 6th Fleet intercepted and decrypted an American signal on 27 May 1944 reporting the destruction of the submarines, it sent a warning message that prompted Ro-109′s commanding officer to move her to a new position 60 nautical miles (110 km; 69 mi) northwest of the area in which Ro-109 had been patrolling. She subsequently departed her patrol area on 31 May 1944 and set course for Truk, which she reached on 5 June 1944.

=== Sixth war patrol ===
Ro-109 departed Truk on 12 June 1944 to conduct her sixth war patrol, ordered to patrol in the vicinity of Truk itself. She joined Patrol Unit D on 16 June but found no targets and departed her patrol area on 22 June 1944. She returned to Truk on 28 June 1944, then headed for Sasebo, arriving there on 16 July 1944.

=== July–October 1944 ===
After her arrival at Sasebo, Ro-109 underwent repairs and an overhaul. On 15 August 1944, Submarine Division 51 was disbanded, and Ro-109 and Ro-112 were reassigned to the Kure Submarine Squadron for service as training vessels. On 25 September 1944, Ro-109 was reassigned to Submarine Division 33 in the Kure Submarine Squadron.

On 13 October 1944, the Combined Fleet ordered the activation of Operation Shō-Gō 1, the defense of the Philippine Islands, in anticipation of an American invasion of the islands, and Ro-109 was attached directly to Combined Fleet headquarters on 17 October 1944. On 20 October 1944, the Battle of Leyte began with U.S. landings on Leyte in the Philippines, and that day Ro-109 was reassigned to Submarine Division 34 in the 6th Fleet.

=== Seventh war patrol ===
Ro-109 was reassigned to Patrol Unit C on 25 October 1944, and that day she departed Kure, Japan, to commence her seventh war patrol, heading for a patrol area in the Lamon Bay area off Luzon in the Philippines. She was on the surface recharging her batteries 140 nautical miles (260 km; 160 mi) north-northeast of Manila at 07:00 Japan Standard Time on 3 November 1944 when she sighted an Allied submarine, also on the surface. She submerged and began an approach, but the Allied submarine crash-dived before she could attack it. She departed her patrol area on 10 November 1944, and on 19 November 1944 she arrived at Sasebo to undergo repairs and an overhaul.

=== Eighth war patrol ===
After completion of the work, Ro-109 began her eighth war patrol on 18 December 1944, departing Sasebo bound for a patrol area in the Philippine Sea east of the Philippine Islands. At 14:20 on 23 December 1944, she was 490 nautical miles (910 km; 560 mi) east of Cape Eluanbi, Formosa, when her sound operator heard the propeller noises of an Allied task force. Although she tracked the task force for some time, she was unable to reach an attack position. On 5 January 1945, she was 330 nautical miles (610 km; 380 mi) southeast of Cape Eluanbi when she made sound contact on a possible Allied convoy, but again she could not make an attack. She concluded her patrol with her return to Sasebo on 12 January 1945.

=== Ninth war patrol ===
Ro-109 got back underway from Sasebo on 3 February 1945 for her ninth war patrol, assigned a patrol area in the South China Sea west of Luzon. At 18:00 on 16 February 1945 she sighted an Allied battleship and two cruisers escorted by a destroyers steaming northward 60 nautical miles (110 km; 69 mi) west of Lingayen Gulf. She made an unsuccessful attack on an Allied task force in the same area on 17 February 1945. She arrived at Kure on 2 March 1945 and later moved to Sasebo for repairs and an overhaul.

=== Tenth war patrol ===
On 12 April 1945, Ro-109 departed Sasebo and moved to the Terashima Strait west of Sasebo, where she spent the night of 12–13 April 1945. At 10:00 on 13 April 1945 she got back underway to begin her tenth war patrol, bound for a patrol area in the Philippine Sea 20 nautical miles (37 km; 23 mi) south of Okinawa, where the Battle of Okinawa had been raging since 1 April 1945. She was scheduled to arrive in her patrol area on 20 April 1945. After her departure from the Terashima Strait, the Japanese never heard from her again.

=== Loss ===
The U.S. Navy fast transport USS Horace A. Bass (APD-124) was escorting a 17-ship convoy from Guam to Okinawa 165 nautical miles (306 km; 190 mi) south-southwest of Okidaitōjima when she detected a submerged submarine on sonar at a range of 1,250 yards (1,140 m) at 18:04 on 25 April 1945. She dropped five depth charges, and the submarine began to make radical evasive maneuvers and emit sound impulses to jam Horace A. Bass′s sonar. Horace A. Bass lost sonar contact after the depth charges exploded, then regained it at a range of 900 yards (820 m) and dropped five more depth charges, but the submarine — which Horace A. Bass′s crew assessed to be using German-made Bold sonar decoys — survived and dived deeper. Horace A. Bass made a final attack with six more depth charges, and before 20:00 debris and oil rose to the surface, indicating the sinking of the submarine at 21°58′N 129°38′E. Horace A. Bass then rejoined her convoy.

The submarine Horace A. Bass sank probably was Ro-109. On 7 May 1945, the Imperial Japanese Navy declared Ro-109 to be presumed lost off Okinawa with all 65 men on board. The Japanese struck her from the Navy list on 10 June 1945.
