= Japanese submarine Ro-112 =

History

Japan
- Name: Submarine No. 403
- Builder: Kawasaki, Senshu and Kobe, Japan
- Laid down: 20 June 1942
- Renamed: Ro-112 on 5 February 1943
- Launched: 25 March 1943
- Completed: 14 September 1943
- Commissioned: 14 September 1943
- Fate: Sunk, 11 February 1945
- Stricken: 10 May 1945

General characteristics
- Class & type: Ro-100-class submarine
- Displacement: 611 t (601 long tons) surfaced; 795 t (782 long tons) submerged
- Length: 60.90 m (199 ft 10 in) overall
- Beam: 6.00 m (19 ft 8 in)
- Draft: 3.51 m (11 ft 6 in)
- Installed power: 1,000 bhp (750 kW) (diesel); 760 hp (570 kW) (electric motor)
- Propulsion: Diesel-electric; 1 × diesel engine; 1 × electric motor
- Speed: 14.2 knots (26.3 km/h; 16.3 mph) surfaced; 8 knots (15 km/h; 9.2 mph) submerged
- Range: 3,500 nmi (6,500 km; 4,000 mi) at 12 knots (22 km/h; 14 mph) surfaced; 60 nmi (110 km; 69 mi) at 3 knots (5.6 km/h; 3.5 mph) submerged
- Test depth: 75 m (246 ft)
- Crew: 38
- Armament: 4 × bow 533 mm (21 in) torpedo tubes; 2 × 25 mm (1 in) Type 96 anti-aircraft guns or 1 × 76.2 mm (3.00 in) L/40 AA gun

Ro-112 was an Imperial Japanese Navy Ro-100-class submarine. Completed and commissioned in September 1943, she served in World War II, operating off Australia, in the Netherlands East Indies, and off the Admiralty Islands and the Philippine Islands. She was sunk in February 1945 during her eighth war patrol.

== Design and description ==
The Ro-100 class was a medium-sized, coastal submarine derived from the preceding Kaichū type. They displaced 611 tonnes (601 long tons) surfaced and 795 tonnes (782 long tons) submerged. The submarines were 60.9 meters (199 ft 10 in) long, had a beam of 6 meters (19 ft 8 in) and a draft of 3.51 meters (11 ft 6 in). They had a double hull and a diving depth of 75 meters (246 ft).

For surface running, the boats were powered by two 500-brake-horsepower (373 kW) diesel engines, each driving one propeller shaft. When submerged each propeller was driven by a 380-horsepower (283 kW) electric motor. They could reach 14.2 knots (26.3 km/h; 16.3 mph) on the surface and 8 knots (15 km/h; 9.2 mph) underwater. On the surface, the Ro-100s had a range of 3,500 nautical miles (6,500 km; 4,000 mi) at 12 knots (22 km/h; 14 mph); submerged, they had a range of 60 nmi (110 km; 69 mi) at 3 knots (5.6 km/h; 3.5 mph).

The boats were armed with four internal bow 53.3 cm (21.0 in) torpedo tubes and carried a total of eight torpedoes. They were also armed with two single mounts for 25 mm (1 in) Type 96 anti-aircraft guns or a single 76.2 mm (3.00 in) L/40 AA gun.

== Construction and commissioning ==
Ro-112 was laid down as Submarine No. 403 on 20 June 1942 by Kawasaki at Senshu, Japan. Renamed Ro-112 on 5 February 1943, she was launched on 25 March 1943. She then was towed to Kawasaki's shipyard at Kobe, Japan, for fitting-out. She was completed and commissioned at Kobe on 14 September 1943.

== Service history ==
=== September 1943–January 1944 ===
Upon commissioning, Ro-112 was attached to the Kure Naval District and was assigned to Submarine Squadron 11 for workups. On 25 December 1943, she was reassigned to Submarine Division 30 in the 8th Fleet in the Southeast Area Fleet. She departed Kure, Japan, on 26 December 1943 bound for Surabaya on Java in the Japanese-occupied Netherlands East Indies. Submarine Division 30 was reassigned to Submarine Squadron 8 in the 6th Fleet on 1 January 1944.

=== First war patrol ===
Ro-112 got underway from Surabaya on 19 January 1944 for her first war patrol, assigned a patrol area off Australia. The patrol was uneventful, and she returned to Surabaya in mid-February 1944.

=== Second war patrol ===
Ro-112 put to sea from Surabaya to begin her second war patrol in early March 1944. She was surfacing in the Java Sea north of Bali off Cape Bungkulan at 08°02′S 115°25′E on 19 March 1944 when the United States Navy submarine USS Rasher sighted her. Rasher's watch officer described Ro-112 as a black submarine of the "Ro-51 class." At 11:49, Rasher fired four Mark 14 Mod 3 torpedoes at Ro-112, but Ro-112 turned to port and evaded them.

While at sea, Ro-112 was reassigned to Submarine Division 51 in Submarine Squadron 7 in the 6th Fleet on 20 March 1944. She concluded her patrol by calling at Surabaya from 25 March to 11 April 1944, then set course for Saipan in the Mariana Islands, which she reached on 20 April 1944.

=== Third war patrol ===
Ro-112 got underway from Saipan on 24 April 1944 for her third war patrol, assigned a patrol area north of New Guinea. While at sea, she was reassigned to Patrol Unit B on 29 April 1944 and ordered to operate south of Woleai′s Mereyon Island. Otherwise, her patrol passed quietly, and she returned to Saipan on 6 May 1944.

=== Fourth war patrol ===
Ro-112 got underway from Saipan on 16 May 1944 for her fourth war patrol, ordered to join the submarines Ro-104, Ro-105, Ro-106, Ro-108, Ro-109, and Ro-116 in forming a submarine picket line north of the Admiralty Islands designated Scouting Line NA. The picket line was tasked with providing warning of any move toward the Palau Islands by Allied invasion forces.

On 18 May 1944, U.S. Navy signals intelligence personnel intercepted and decrypted Japanese signals indicating the formation of Scouting Line NA between Truk and the Admiralties. A U.S. Navy hunter-killer group composed of the destroyer escorts USS England, USS George, and USS Raby departed Purvis Bay in the Solomon Islands to attack the submarines involved. The hunter-killer group had great success, sinking several of the submarines. When the Japanese 6th Fleet intercepted and decrypted an American signal on 27 May 1944 reporting the destruction of the submarines, it sent a warning message that prompted Ro-112's commanding officer to move her to a new position 100 nautical miles (190 km; 120 mi) northwest of the area in which Ro-112 had been patrolling. She subsequently departed her patrol area and set course for Truk, which she reached on 8 June 1944.

=== Fifth war patrol ===
Ro-112 departed Truk on 14 June 1944 to conduct her fifth war patrol, ordered to patrol in the Philippine Sea. Her patrol was quiet, and she returned to Truk on 27 June 1944.

=== July–October 1944 ===
Ro-112 got underway from Truk on 7 July 1944 bound for Yokosuka, Japan, which she reached on 17 July 1944. She later moved to Kure. On 15 August 1944, Submarine Division 51 was disbanded, and Ro-109 and Ro-112 were reassigned to the Kure Submarine Squadron for service as training vessels. On 25 September 1944, Ro-112 was reassigned to Submarine Division 33 in the Kure Submarine Squadron.

On 13 October 1944, the Combined Fleet ordered the activation of Operation Shō-Gō 1, the defense of the Philippine Islands, in anticipation of an American invasion of the islands. On 20 October 1944, the Battle of Leyte began with U.S. landings on Leyte in the Philippines, and that day Ro-112 was reassigned to Submarine Division 34, subordinated directly to Combined Fleet headquarters.

=== Sixth and seventh war patrols ===
Ro-112 departed Kure to commence her sixth war patrol on 23 October 1944, heading for a patrol area in the Philippine Sea east of the Philippine Islands. The patrol was uneventful, and it concluded with her arrival at Mako in the Pescadores Islands on 21 November 1944. She got underway from Mako on 30 November 1944 for her seventh war patrol, assigned a patrol area in the Lamon Bay area off Luzon in the Philippines. After another quiet patrol, she returned to Kure on 28 December 1944.

=== Eighth war patrol ===
Ro-112 began her eighth war patrol on 22 January 1945, departing Kure bound for a patrol area in the South China Sea west of Luzon. On 4 February 1945, the 6th Fleet ordered Ro-112 and the submarines Ro-46, Ro-113, and Ro-115 to proceed to Takao, Formosa, unload their reserve torpedoes and deck gun ammunition there, and then head for Batulinao on the northern coast of Luzon to rescue Japanese pilots stranded in Luzon's Aparri area and transport them to Takao. After calling at Takao from 7 to 9 February 1945, Ro-112 got back underway and set course for Batulinao.

=== Loss ===
Ro-112 was on the surface in the Luzon Strait in the vicinity of Camiguan Island north of Luzon on the evening of 11 February 1945 when the U.S. Navy submarine USS Batfish detected her on radar at 18:51 bearing 310 degrees from Batfish at a range of 8,000 yards (7,300 m). Batfish's radar detector also picked up Ro-112's radar emissions. Batfish closed the range and sighted Ro-112 at a range of 1,300 yards (1,200 m) at 20:37. Batfish lost contact at 20:43 when Ro-112 submerged.

At 21:05, Batfish's sound operator heard Ro-112 blow her ballast tanks, and Ro-112 surfaced at 21:06. Batfish began to detect Ro-112′s radar emissions again and established radar contact on her at a range of 8,650 yards (7,910 m). Batfish closed the range, and submerged to radar depth at a range of 6,000 yards (5,500 m) at 21:50. At 22:02, Batfish fired four Mark 18 torpedoes from her bow torpedo tubes at a range of 880 yards (800 m). The first one hit Ro-112 and blew her apart, sinking her immediately at 18°53′N 121°47′E with the loss of all hands.

On 20 February 1945, the Imperial Japanese Navy declared Ro-112 to be presumed lost in the Luzon Strait with all 61 men on board. The Japanese struck her from the Navy list on 10 May 1945.
