= USS LST-342 =

1942 LST-1-class tank landing ship

Coordinates: 9°8′14″S 160°14′57″E

History

United States
- Name: USS LST-342
- Builder: Norfolk Navy Yard, Portsmouth, Virginia
- Laid down: 21 August 1942
- Launched: 8 November 1942
- Commissioned: 31 December 1942
- Stricken: 28 July 1943
- Honors and awards: 1 × battle star; 1 × Navy Unit Commendation
- Fate: Sunk, 18 July 1943

General characteristics
- Class & type: LST-1-class tank landing ship
- Displacement: 1,625 long tons (1,651 t) light; 4,080 long tons (4,145 t) full load
- Length: 328 ft (100 m)
- Beam: 50 ft (15 m)
- Draught: Unloaded : 2 ft 4 in (0.71 m) bow; 7 ft 6 in (2.29 m) stern; Loaded : 8 ft 3 in (2.51 m) bow; 14 ft 1 in (4.29 m) stern
- Propulsion: 2 × 900 hp (671 kW) General Motors 12-567 diesel engines, two shafts
- Speed: 12 knots (14 mph; 22 km/h)
- Range: 24,000 nmi (44,000 km) at 9 kn (17 km/h; 10 mph) (fully loaded)
- Boats & landing craft carried: 2 LCVPs
- Capacity: 1,600–1,900 short tons (1,500–1,700 t)
- Troops: Approx. 150 officers and other ranks
- Complement: 7 officers, 104 enlisted
- Armament: 2 × twin 40 mm Bofors guns; 4 × single 40 mm Bofors guns; 12 × 20 mm guns

USS LST-342 was an LST-1-class tank landing ship built for the United States Navy during World War II. LST-342 was laid down on 21 August 1942 by the Norfolk Navy Yard; launched on 8 November 1942; sponsored by Mrs. Philip H. Ryan; and commissioned on 31 December 1942.

She was assigned to the Asiatic-Pacific theater and participated in the New Georgia-Rendova-Vangunu occupation in July 1943. She was struck by a Japanese torpedo off the Solomon Islands on 18 July 1943 from the Ro-106. The resultant explosion broke the ship into two sections, with the stern sinking immediately, while the bow remained afloat and was towed to Purvis Bay (Tokyo Bay) off Florida Island and beached so that usable equipment could be salvaged. The bow was then abandoned. 82 men went down with the ship, including the commanding officer of LST Group 14, Commander Paul S. Slawson, and the artist Lieutenant Commander McClelland Barclay.

She was struck from the Navy list on 28 July 1943. LST-342 earned one battle star and the Navy Unit Commendation for World War II service.

== See also ==
- List of United States Navy LSTs
