= Purvis Bay =

Coordinates: 9°09′S 160°15′E

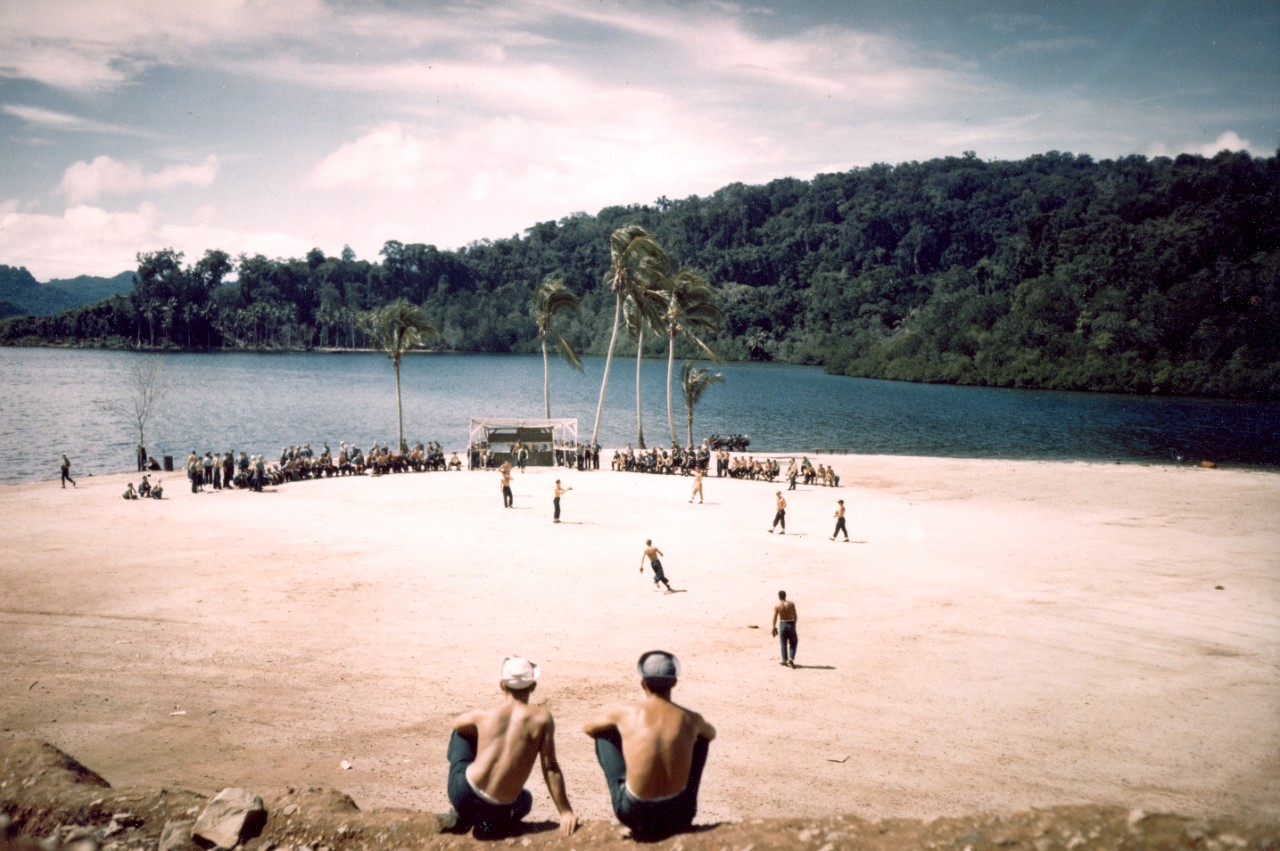
Fleet Recreation Center, Port Purvis, Florida Island, 21 April 1944

Purvis Bay is located in the Nggela Islands, part of the Solomon Islands. Purvis Bay is the sheltered area to the south of the island Nggela Sule (referred to as Florida Island during World War II), including and trending southeast from the neighbouring Tulagi islet.

Purvis Bay and the Nggela Islands lie across "Ironbottom Sound" from Guadalcanal. The bay was the site of Port Purvis, maintained by the United States Navy, for use by the Allied navies in the Pacific Ocean theater of World War II.
