= AMES Type 6 =

Portable early warning radar

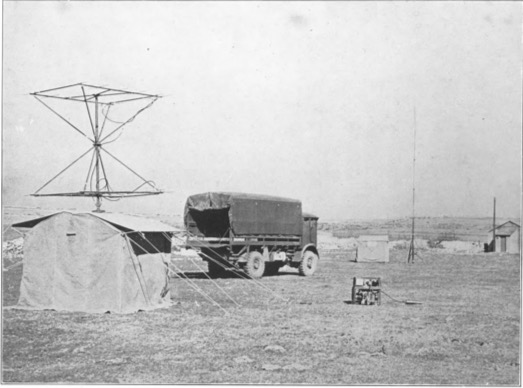
- AMES Type 6 Mark III
- Country of origin: UK
- Introduced: 1941
- No. built: hundreds
- Type: early warning
- Frequency: 176 MHz Mk. II; 212 MHz Mk. III; 193 MHz Mk. IV; 500-600 MHz Mk. V
- PRF: 400 pps
- RPM: ~4 rpm
- Range: 36 mi (58 km)
- Azimuth: 360º
- Precision: 2° in azimuth, 1 mi in range
- Power: 85 to 100 kW
- Other names: Light Warning Set (L/W), AA No.4, SCR-602, AN/TPS-3

AMES Type 6, also known as the Light Warning Set or L/W, was a portable early warning radar developed by the Air Ministry Experimental Station (AMES) for use by the Royal Air Force (RAF) in the field. Units in British Army service were officially known as Radar, Anti-Aircraft, Number 4, or AA. No. 4 for short, although this name was rarely used in practice. The system was also built in Canada for use by the US Army, who referred to them as SCR-602-A.

The antenna consisted of four Yagi antennas mounted on a central pole. Supports running from the pole to the corners of the antennas give it a distinctive hourglass-like shape. The pole sat in a bearing to provide rotation around the vertical axis, allowing it to scan the horizon. The Type 6 was based on the same 1.5 m wavelength electronics as the ASV Mark II. As this wavelength became increasingly congested, the Type 6 Mark III moved to 212 MHz and introduced a new truck mounting to improve mobility. A small number of Type 6 Mark IVs operating at 193 MHz were also produced for use in the presence of German jamming. In the field, all Type 6's were normally paired with an IFF Mark III transceiver, using an omnidirectional antenna.

A completely different version was introduced as the Type 6 Mark V. This version moved from the 1.5 m band to 50 cm, allowing it to operate from much smaller antennas. The antenna array was more complex, using eight Yagis for improved antenna gain. The US equivalent of the Mark V was the SCR-602-T8, but this version replaced the multiple Yagis with a parabolic reflector. Both models were intended as stop-gap systems that could be quickly set up during forward movements while awaiting the arrival of larger and more capable units. These saw use primarily in northern Europe after D-Day.

Several hundred Type 6's were produced, along with an unknown number of SCR-602's. They were widespread in the mid-to-late World War II period, seeing action in North Africa, Italy, and South East Asia. A similar system was developed in Australia, the Light Weight Air Warning Radar, and Canada, the Zone Position Indicator. Almost all of these were replaced in the post-war period by the US AN/TPS-1, which saw widespread use by many nations.

== History ==
=== Higher frequencies ===
By early 1936, after less than a year of development, the Chain Home (CH) system was reaching the goals set for its initial operational requirements. This was possible because the system had deliberately been based on an existing commercial shortwave radio system, the 50 m BBC World Service. As this required enormous antennas, the team reduced the wavelength in steps to the final 10 to 13 m used during the war.

In April 1937, Henry Tizard grew concerned that CH would be so effective at guiding RAF Fighter Command's aircraft onto their targets that the Luftwaffe would give up daylight bombing and turn to night bombing. A pilot's eyesight at night is too limited to effectively engage aircraft even with CH guidance. The solution was a radar set with limited range that was small and light enough to be mounted within an aircraft, closing the gap between the CH's 5 miles (8.0 km) accuracy and the approximate 1,000 yards (910 m) range of the pilot's eyesight.

"Taffy" Bowen led the development effort of what became known as Airborne Interception radar, or AI for short. To make the system practical, it had to use the smallest possible antennas, which in turn demanded the use of the highest possible frequencies. Given the state of the art, a suitable high-frequency receiver proved to be the single largest problem in AI development. This was finally solved when Bowen's former thesis advisor, Edward V. Appleton, told him that there were many unused experimental television receivers at Pye Electronics that might be suitable. Bowen's team found these were far and away the best receivers in Britain. This "Pye strip" receiver was soon being used by other teams for all sorts of uses.

As the threat of U-boat attacks grew, the AI unit was given much larger antennas to improve sensitivity, entering service in 1939 as Radar, Air-Surface Vessel, Mark I. This system used two Yagi antennas pointed slightly to the right and left of the centreline of the aircraft, and by comparing the relative strength of the returns from the two antennas, the radar operator could determine which side of the aircraft the target lay on.

=== Portability ===
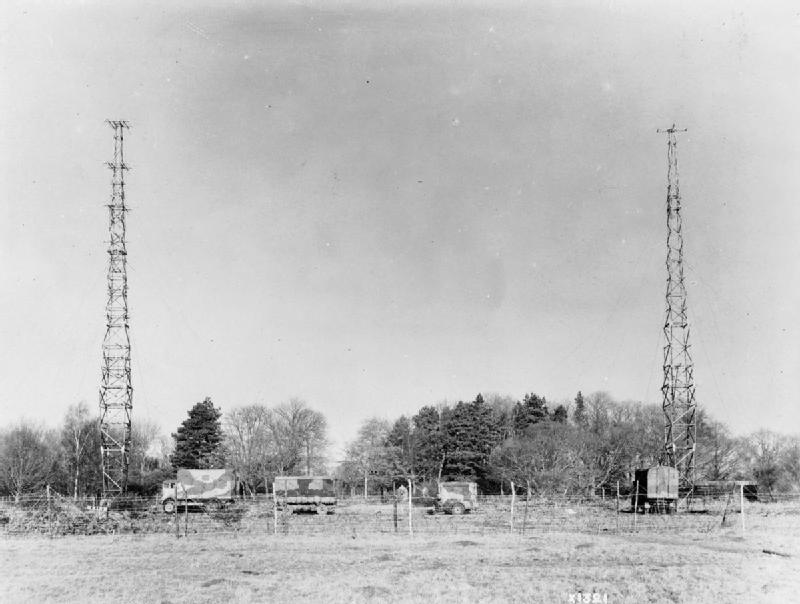
The AMES Type 9 was powerful, but too unwieldily for practical use in the African theatre.

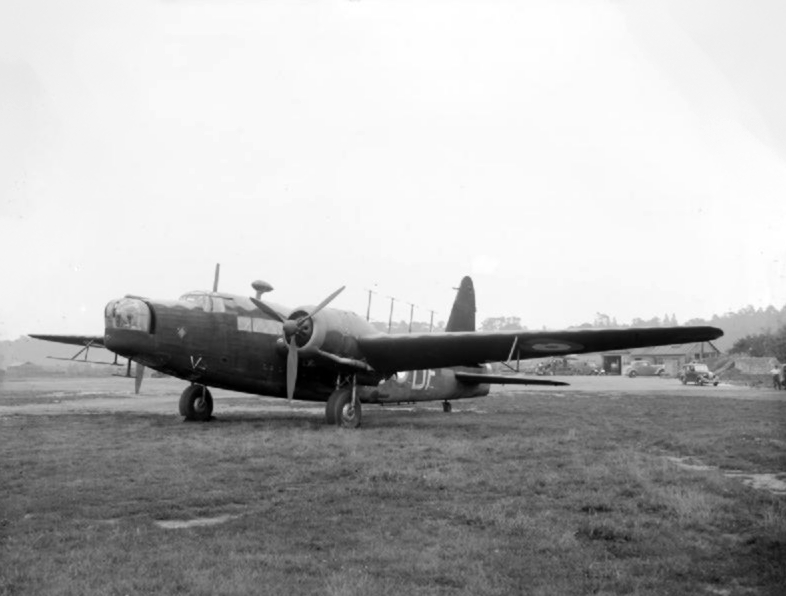
By comparing the strength of the blips from the two large ASV Mk. II antennas under the wings, aimed to the left and right, this Vickers Wellington GR.VIII could determine the bearing to a surface target.

As the Battle of Britain wound down, the RAF turned their attention to offensive operations in the North Africa campaign. With huge stretches of open land between the opposing forces, and few secure locations to use as forward reporting centers, Luftwaffe sorties were rarely intercepted. At the same time, the British Army found that while their new Gun Laying radars provided accurate aiming information for their anti-aircraft artillery, their highly directional antennas made them almost useless for detecting the aircraft and giving them time to prepare for action. As the campaign was marked by its mobile nature, sweeping hundreds of miles back and forth across the desert, there was a need for an equally mobile early warning radar system.

The Air Ministry had realized the need for a mobile radar system and had developed the AMES Type 9 Mobile Radar Unit (MRU) for this role. These were "transportable" versions of the original Chain Home systems. Thirteen heavy trucks were required to carry the system, which used two 105 foot (32 m) tall towers that could be collapsed vertically for transport. Despite a crew of 60 personnel, the system still took two days to be set up. While effective, with detection ranges up to 150 miles (240 km), the system was far too unwieldy for use in the African theatre. The need for a much smaller and more portable system was obvious.

ASV, designed from the start to be robust and lightweight for use in aircraft, was a natural fit for this role. Two such systems were built by fitters who pulled the equipment out of anti-submarine Vickers Wellington aircraft and adapted them to the early warning role by modifying the antennas. For ASV, the antenna was designed for short to medium range and high angular accuracy with respect to the nose of the aircraft. For the early-warning role accuracy was less important than longer range, which was difficult due to the small size of its targets compared to a U-boat. Instead of the two antennas pointing in different directions, fitters attached them to a square metal frame so they were pointed in the same direction and exactly one wavelength apart, so that their signals added together along the line directly in front of them, the "line of shoot", doubling gain.

A second set of two antennas was added, mounted on the same pole but positioned about one and a half wavelength below the first. This took advantage of the fact that antennas located close to the ground will reflect some signal off it, and the combination of the direct wave and the reflected one causes a series of vertical "lobes" to be created due to the resulting interference pattern. The operator could switch between the upper and lower sets, which had different lobe patterns, which allowed some estimation of the altitude. For long-range detection the two pairs were used at the same time, doubling gain again. With both pairs operational, detection range was on the order of 50 miles (80 km), far short of the MRU systems but its small size and mobility allowed it to be moved as close as 10 miles (16 km) from the front and made up any difference in performance though improved siting.

The initial version was transportable, meaning it could be transported by truck and set up on-site. It could also be broken down into small loads for transport via aircraft or mule pack. The antenna array was mounted on a pole that sat on a horizontal turntable that was placed on the ground. The radio frequency equipment was placed on the same turntable, and rotated with the antennas. These parts were protected by tenting. A separate generator provided power, and if a radio was needed to maintain communications with other units, a transmitter truck was added.

=== Improved models ===
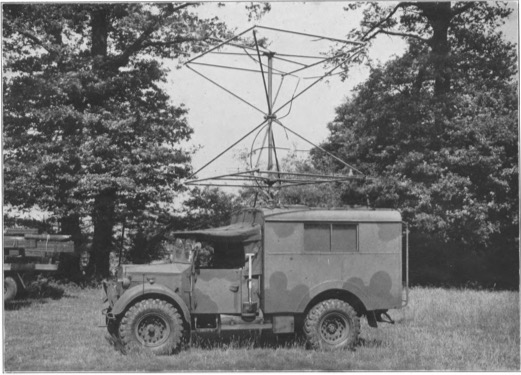
AMES Type 6 Mark III truck mounted versions could be operational in minutes.

These early lash-ups, retroactively known as Mark I, were soon replaced by new production units, the Mark II. The only major difference, aside from minor mechanical details, was the addition of an input for an IFF Mark III interrogator. By 1944 only a few of these were still in use, mostly overseas.

The Mk. IIs were mostly replaced by the Mark III, which operated on a slightly different frequency, 212 MHz, in order to avoid interference with the ever-growing list of systems operating on the 1.5 m band. The Mark III was designed to be operated from a tent, like earlier models, or mounted directly on the back of a truck, initially a Fordson WOT. The truck version could be set up simply by starting up the generator and connecting the display. Similar conversions were made using the Canadian Military Pattern truck, both the Chevrolet C15A and Ford F15. The system required a crew of only three, or ten to provide continual 24-hour operation, and it could set it up at a new site in as little as 30 minutes.

The system proved to be extremely useful in the field. On two occasions, LWRs were airlifted into recently captured enemy airfields and manpacked to nearby hills and set up within 30 minutes of arrival. This meant they were ready to provide early warning of counterattacks before the enemy even had time to arrange them. At Cape Serrat in Tunisia, two systems were carried through a forest and swampland to a lighthouse where they were able to track Luftwaffe aircraft making supply flights into Tunis. This allowed the RAF to attack them, including a disastrous mission in which 16 of 27 Messerschmitt Me 323 Gigants were shot down. (Note: Sources claim anywhere from 14 to 24 being shot down, but 16 is the most common value.) The Germans were so angry that they subjected the site to 67 air attacks, forcing the units to be resupplied by foot at night and suffering from a continual lack of food and water.

=== New frequencies ===
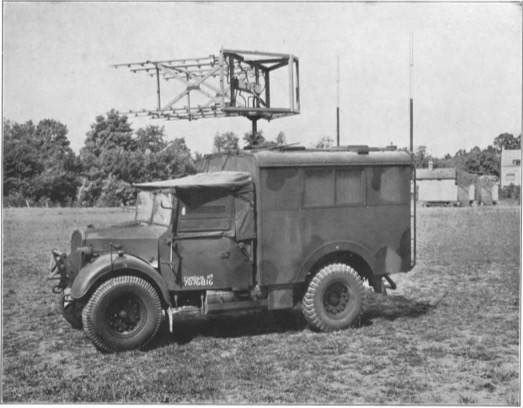
AMES Type 6 Mark V. The much smaller antenna array allows two IFF Mark III antennas to be mounted at the rear corners of the truck.

As the jamming war between the UK and Germany grew in intensity in the second half of the war, the British forces introduced new models of most of their important radar systems that operated on new frequencies that the Germans would not be familiar with. This led to the Mark IV, which was essentially identical to the Mark III but operated on 193 MHz and was produced in small numbers and held in the UK in reserve.

A more radical upgrade was the Mark V, which moved to much higher frequencies around 600 MHz, or 50 cm wavelength, which had become possible with the introduction of new models of the micropup vacuum tubes, the NT99. The shorter wavelength allowed the antennas to be smaller and the half-wavelength separation was also greatly reduced. This allowed the antenna array to grow to eight Yagis in two rows of four and still be packed into a much smaller space than the original four-Yagi system. Because the antenna system was smaller, room was now available for an IFF Mark III to be mounted on the same truck, with the radar antenna at the front and the two IFF antennas at the rear corners. The system was otherwise the same, using the same displays and other pieces. Detection range improved slightly for low-altitude objects, but decreased slightly for high-altitude.

=== US and Canadian production ===
In early 1942, Colonel Gordon Saville, director of US Army Director of Air Defense, sent out a requirement for "equipment similar to the British light mobile or portable early warning set." A telegram from Major General James E. Chaney in London stated two sets would be sent to the US as patterns, but nothing arrived for the next two months. General Olmstead sent a message to the Chiefs of Staff to speed delivery. Blueprints arrived shortly, and on 25 June, Eisenhower messaged that a unit was on its way. After examining the unit, in mid-July the Signal Corps ordered 100 sets and another 100 to be spares. At the end of the month they raised their order with another 200 sets to be supplied by the British via Research Enterprises Limited (REL) in Toronto. Delivery was to begin in January at a unit price of $15,000 (equivalent to $289,000 in 2024), known as SCR-602 Type 1.

By the end of 1942, no less than ten different versions of SCR-602 were being built by teams at REL, the US Navy, ITT, RCA, Bell Labs, General Electric and the Signal Corps Radar Laboratory. The first to arrive were 25 sets from REL which were identical to the original 1,200 pounds (540 kg) British model and were known as the Type 1 (T1). The next 250 production units were of a slightly modified design known as the T6, and then a final modification to become the SCR-602-A. General Electric's model, the Type 7, was an otherwise similar design but packaged into units of 250 pounds (110 kg) designed to be dropped by parachute.

The Signal Corps' version, Type 8, was much more heavily modified. Using the new VT-158 triodes, the system was able to operate at 50 cm wavelength (600 MHz frequency), three times shorter wavelength than the original design. As antenna size is a function of wavelength, this allowed the antenna to be reduced by three times in size as well, only 25 cm long. This smaller antenna was then placed in front of a wire mesh parabolic reflector that greatly reduced the beamwidth and allowed the power of the transmitter to be more tightly focussed.

The Type 8 represented a dramatic advance, and soon the British Air Vice Marshal Reginald Baynes Mansell commented "this development is one of the most important in Ground Radar technique in recent years and that the designers are to be congratulated in producing a receiver, display and high power transmitter in a single unit measuring only 42 inches by 20 inches by 20 inches." This version was given the name AN/TPS-3 as part of the newly introduced common equipment naming in the US forces.

=== Replacement ===
As part of the Tizard Mission in September 1940, the British revealed the cavity magnetron to US researchers. The US immediately organized the MIT Radiation Laboratory to develop the magnetron and radar systems based on it. Among these developments was the SCR-603, essentially the 602 using a magnetron transmitter instead of conventional triodes. By the time it was ready for use in the late 1943 period, the older SCR naming was being phased out and this system is almost universally known as the AN/TPS-1. The system was just beginning to enter widespread service as World War II came to an end, and many units were rendered surplus. The system was immediately picked up by many European nations as they were available at low prices. In RAF service these were known as AMES Type 61, and had largely replaced the Type 6 in the immediate post-war era.

== Description ==
=== 1.5 m sets ===
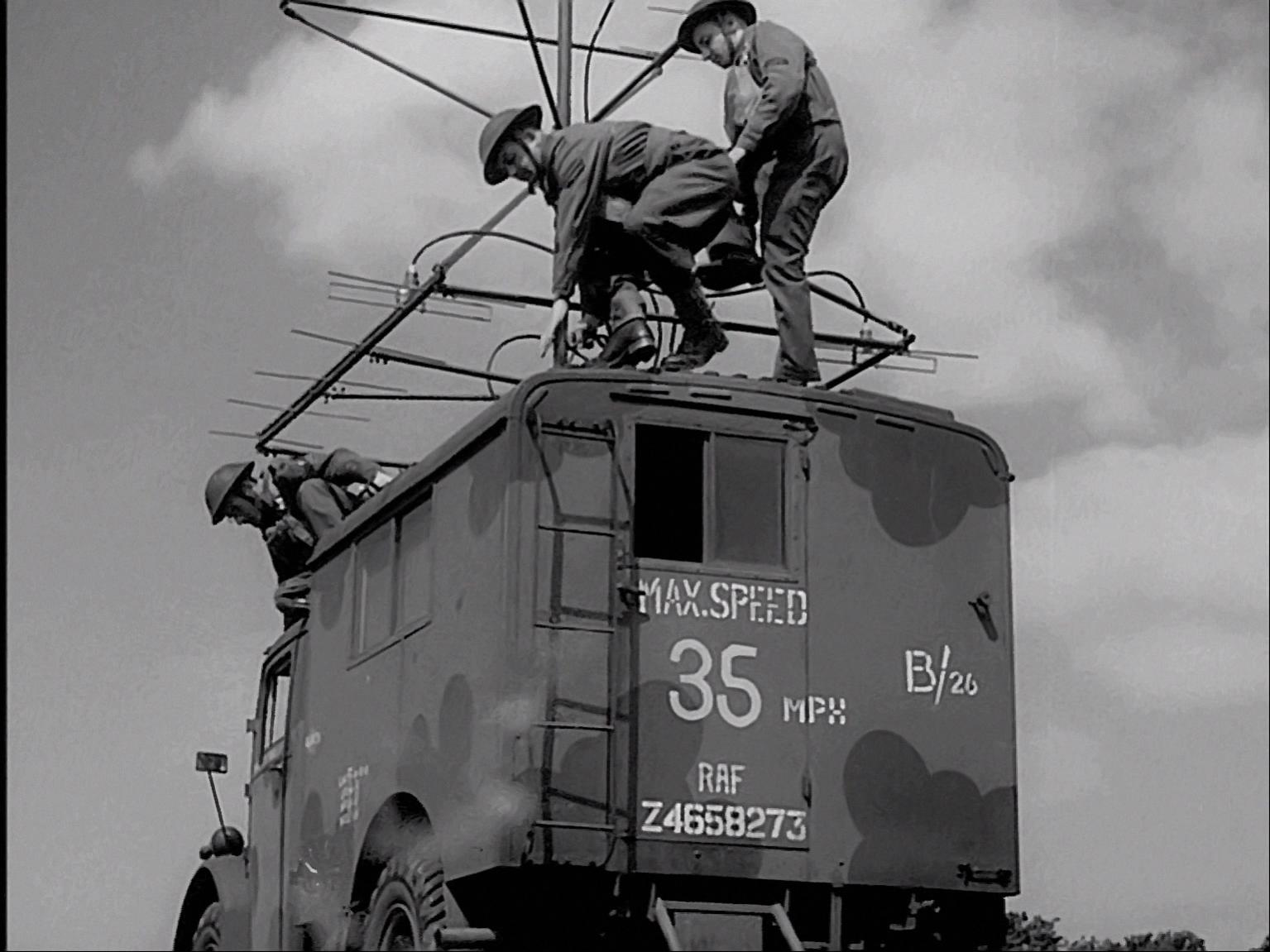
Setting up the Mark III was quick, the antennas collapsed vertically for transit and simply had to be raised and clamped into position.

The original system consisted of the antenna pole in two 98 inches (2,500 mm) lengths. These joined at the top of the protective pyramidal tent. The turntable sat on the ground and the pole was placed in it. The antennas were attached to the upper pole on two cross-arms with the antennas at the end of the arms. Smaller poles ran from the front and rear of each antenna to a point on the pole between the upper and lower cross-arms. When packed down for shipping, it required 331 cubic feet (9.4 m^{3}) of space. Packed weight for the 602-T1 was 1,875 pounds (850 kg) in nine packages.

Two displays were provided, a 6 inches (150 mm) diameter cathode ray tube (CRT) was used as an A-scope for measuring range, and a 9 inches (230 mm) CRT used as a PPI display. If the system was paired with a IFF Mark III interrogator, its output was presented on a second channel on the A-scope, below the main radar return.

As the system was designed to be used only while awaiting more powerful systems, it was not designed to operate for more than 500 hours before requiring a complete overhaul. In most operations a crew of four was needed, but if 24 hour operation was required, a crew of fourteen was needed, both for operations and continual maintenance.

Power was provided by two 600 Watt 12000 Hz AC generators and a single 500 Watt DC generator driven by a shared 6 horsepower (4.5 kW) gasoline engine. Fuel consumption was 0.5 US gallons (1.9 L; 0.42 imp gal) per hour.

Performance against a bomber-sized target depended on the target altitude and the particulars of the site. For an aircraft at 1,000 ft, range was given as 12 miles (19 km), or as much as 50 miles (80 km) if the radar was mounted at the top of a cliff. For an aircraft at 20,000 ft, this improved to 48 miles (77 km) and 55 miles (89 km).

=== 50 cm sets ===
The Mark V sets differed from the earlier Mark III sets, largely in the transmitter/receiver electronics and the antenna array.

The SCR-602-T8/AN/TPS-3 was more extensively modified and all of the parts were smaller. It could be packed down into four units of a total 600 pounds (270 kg) and 40 cubic feet (1.1 m^{3}). It was able to operate up to 1000 hours before overhaul, but was otherwise similar in installation and use as the earlier models. The generator engine was similar but drove a single 1,300 W 115 V 400 Hz AC and 250 W DC outputs.
