= Light Weight Air Warning Radar =

Australian portable radar used in WWII

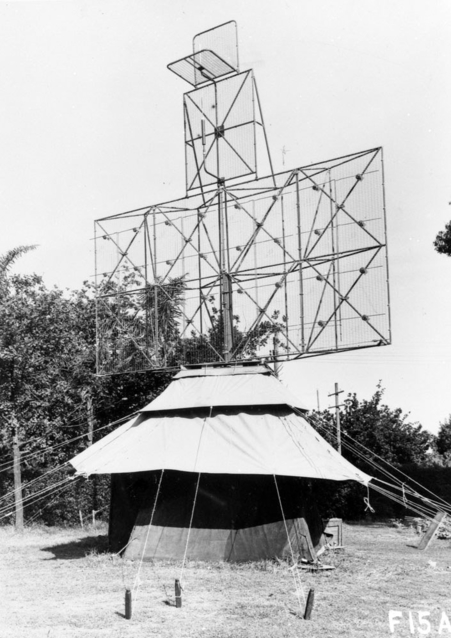
- LW/AW Mark 1A, with IFF antennas on top
- Country of origin: Australia
- Introduced: 1942
- No. built: about 250 (Note: A number of sources state that "A total of 56 units were used by the Australian forces, 60 by the US Army in the Pacific and a further 12 in Burma." Adding the 120 naval versions, this produces a number around 250 units. However, Minnett states that 260 Mark I and II's were produced, which results in a number close to 400 all-in. Better sources for actual production numbers would be useful.)
- Type: early warning
- Frequency: 200 MHz
- PRF: 50 pps
- Pulsewidth: 10 μS
- RPM: manual rotation
- Range: over 100 mi (160 km)
- Azimuth: 360º
- Power: 10 kW Mk. I, 160 to 200 kW Mark III
- Other names: LW/AW, A286Q

The Light Weight Air Warning Radar, or LW/AW was a portable early warning radar produced in Australia during the Second World War. It was designed by the Council for Scientific and Industrial Research, today's CSIRO, to provide field troops with air attack warning in the northern Australia and New Guinea theatres.

From 1940, CSIR had been designing a large system known as Air Warning, Mark I (AW.1) for fixed emplacements, similar in concept to the UK's Chain Home. The first Japanese air attacks on Darwin were carried out before it was in place, and it was some time before this larger unit could be put into action. This led to a December 1941 request for a smaller version that could be held in reserve and then moved into location if the AW system was attacked. Shortly thereafter, field units requested a portable system that could be quickly delivered to forward airfields. In the summer of 1942, CSIR began work on a system that would fill both needs.

The LW/AW emerged as a system designed to be carried in rough conditions and small and light enough to fit in the Douglas DC-2 and Douglas Dakota. Otherwise similar to the AW, a new antenna design based on the UK's Chain Home Low provided the desired range in a robust multi-unit array that could be easily assembled in the field. The prototype entered testing in September 1942, and the first two production models were moved to New Guinea in mid-October and entered full operation on 8 November. The Mark I and slightly modified Mark IA served until the end of the war with about 260 produced.

The Mark II had a larger cabin and modified antenna to support IFF Mark III but was otherwise similar. Minor improvements led to the Mark III that was introduced in 1944, but the earlier versions were so successful it was not put into production. A modification of the Mk. III was used on ships as the A286Q and about 120 were produced.

== History ==
=== Earlier developments ===
In early 1939, the British government invited teams from Canada, Australia, New Zealand and South Africa to visit the UK to be briefed on the then highly secret developments in radar. In September, with the opening of World War II, the Radio Physics Laboratory (RPL) of the Council for Scientific and Industrial Research began development of a surface-search radar, known as Shore Defence, or SHD. SHD was similar to the UK's own Coast Defense system (CD), but added a switch that allowed a single antenna to be used both for transmission and reception, simplifying the system compared to the two-antenna CD. The first SHD was installed in Dover Heights near the entrance to Sydney Harbour.

As attention turned to the threat of air attack, the SHD system was modified with a different antenna layout to allow it to scan to higher angles. This produced the Air Warning radar, or AW Mark I. Although this was a powerful system, with detection on bomber-sized targets out to the range of 100 miles (160 km), it was also relatively large and could only be delivered by ship. Shipping the system took time, and assembly even longer. The system intended for Darwin, which was in range of Japanese bombers from New Guinea, was still being prepared when the first attack took place on 19 February 1942. Darwin was subject to repeated attack, yet it still took another seven weeks before the first set was operational.

=== Smaller systems ===
In December 1941, Wing Commander A.G. Pitcher suggested the Royal Australian Air Force (RAAF) produce a number of smaller mobile radar systems to act as backup in case the AW sites were attacked. These would be held off-site and moved to the original AW location on demand. Doing so would require a smaller and more mobile system. In January 1942, Flying Officer B.F.N. Israel returned from working with the Royal Air Force (RAF) in Singapore and stressed that there was a need for a truly mobile system that could be used in the field. Israel was posted to Sydney as the radar liaison officer between the RPL and HMV, the manufacturer.

By the summer of 1942, the Australian Army was advancing and setting up new airfields. The need for early warning sets at these advanced bases was a serious concern as they were within easy attack range from several Japanese airfields. Pither sent a memo to John Worledge of the NSW Railways who was leading a group that produced the mechanical structures for the AW and SHD sets. Pither suggested that the electronics from the AW were suitable for mobile use if packaged correctly, but the antenna system needed to be produced in a version that could be flown into these airfields using Douglas DC-2 aircraft, which formed the basis of the Australian Transport Command. Pither also copied Israel and Squadron Leader Mitchell, Commander of the Radio School at Richmond.

Pither suggested one way to reduce the size of the antenna would be to remove one horizontal row of elements. But this would reduce the power by 1/3 and greatly reduce range. Israel, who had seen the Chain Home Low (CHL) systems in Singapore, was aware of their layout. He liaised with J.L. Pawsey, an expert in antenna design at the RPL, who produced a new design of four rows of eight dipoles, which maintained 89% of the original antenna gain and improved electronics regained another 5%. But the main benefit was that the antenna was now made up of eight 2 by 2 element cubes that were small enough for air transport and could be connected together in the field. The system was later referred to as the "Worledge aerial system".

=== Into service ===
The prototype system was completed in September 1942, and shipped to Dover Heights for testing. (Note: Briton states that the first prototype was shipped to Darwin and operational by 22 February 1942, only days after the first Japanese attack. He goes on to note this unit allowed fighters to break up a Japanese attack 25 miles (40 km) from the city, whereas previously the fighters were unable to reach the bombers before they were already flying away. This seems extremely unlikely given the development timing. Other accounts, like Minnett, state that the first unit did not arrive in Darwin until "seven weeks" later, and it is unclear if this is a LW set or the original AW originally intended for the city.) The first two production units were flown to Papua New Guinea some time in October. The first was set up at Tufi Airport and went operational on 8 November. Getting the system in place was a difficult job:

The equipment was erected and tested on the outskirts of Port Moresby and then flown over the Owen Stanleys... The gear was then moved overland through the swamps and jungle and across unbridged creeks to the sea. To get to the trawler outside the reefs, the gear was loaded on platforms formed between pairs of native canoes lashed together. The trawler arrived at McLaren Harbour on 30 October 1942, a fiord with cliffs rising 200 ft above the sea level. The gear and all supplies were manhandled [to the top]. It was then carried about three and a half miles to the site on the promontory.

The second unit was operational at Dobodura Airfield on 3 December. Dobodura was a forward location near Buna Airfield, which was itself captured on 14 December 1942. Further units continued to arrive in the theatre, at which point several problems were first noticed. One was that when the radar was turned off for maintenance, the cooling electronics would lead to significant condensation inside the system, which in turn led to the development of fungi inside the units. The problem was considered so severe that in late 1942, General Thomas Blamey was put in charge of getting the problems solved. In early 1943 field units were sent a 205 W electrical heater that automatically turned on when the electronics turned off. This maintained the temperature within the two large equipment chassis.

Other changes were more minor. The packaging continued to be improved through this period, and its ability to float if dropped in the water was tested in Sydney Harbour and the surf at Manly Beach. Another change was to raise the height of the turntable over the ground, as it was noticed airflow under the equipment was too low to properly cool the bottom of the chassis. These changes were formalized as LW/AW Mark IA. Over 260 Mark I and Mark IAs were produced.

=== Mark II ===
In April 1942, the supply of the US built VT90 micropup vacuum tubes that powered the transmitter ran low. An effort began to use an alternative design, the 100TH Eimac. These proved to be able to generate much greater output than the VT90s of the Mark I, and would offer significant gains in effective range. This was not so important for the LW role, but too-short range had proven to be a significant problem for the fixed-place AW units which were typically protecting larger areas like cities. An effort began to replace these with the new units as AW Mark II, which used four of the Eimac tubes in a ring to produce peak power of 50 kW. This was also adapted with a smaller antenna as the A79, for small ships. The first production examples arrived in December 1942, but these proved difficult to keep operational in the field, Supplies of the VT90 improved and the AW Mark II was dropped after only 15 were produced.

By 1943, IFF Mark III was being widely introduced in the US forces, and ad-hoc additions to LW/AW were common. In the second half of the year, a rush effort began to build a more formal solution to connecting the US-built BL3 IFF interrogator units and make them part of the standard equipment list. The IFF antennas were placed on top of the existing antenna array. At the same time, operator complaints about the existing cramped tent leading to poor airflow and resulting high temperatures and humidity led to an effort to design a larger enclosure. This new system became the LW/AW Mark II.

One of the first Mark II units was sent to Bipi Island in early 1944 as part of the Admiralty Islands campaign. It arrived on 5 April and had to be ferried ashore on the local's canoes. The site proved to be poor and it was moved to Los Negros Island in May. before moving again to Manus Island on 26 July. But the time it was operational again it had been moved eighteen times and yet was only non-operational for five hours in nineteen months of operations.

=== Mark III ===
An improved version of the micropup, the NT99, began to arrive around the same time. When applied to the AW electronics, it allowed the power to be increased to 150 kW. An experimental version was operational in July 1943, which revealed that the power was so much that the antenna feeder lines of the LW/AW set would have to be modified. A prototype of the resulting LW/AW Mark III was sent to Los Negros in February 1944. The next month, Bruce Alexander who had worked on the transmitter design, flew to test the unit and related that just before arrived the unit had picked up an aircraft up to 92 miles (148 km) which was invisible to the Mark I. This turned out to be a C-47 that was lost, and fighters were sent to escort it to the airfield.

Although the Mark III proved to be a more powerful unit, it was not put into widespread production due to the earlier versions working well enough and the complications that the new parts would cause in logistics.

=== GCI ===
In August 1942, an effort began to develop a ground controlled interception (GCI) radar. GCI is used to direct fighter aircraft onto their targets, and thus needs to have higher resolution than an early warning design that simply has to show the rough location of targets. Additionally, the A-scope type display used for the EW role is not useful for GCI, where the radar needs to display the locations of both the target and the interceptor at the same time. This demands the use of a plan position indicator (PPI) display. On the other hand, range requirements are generally lessened as another radar would already be providing early warning.

This led to the LW/GCI Mark I, which was heavily modified from the original LW/AW. Its electronics were taken from a US SCR-602 Type 6 and a new antenna support system that separated the original two rows of antennas vertically. By switching between the two arrays, the vertical lobes of the transmitter beams could be used to measure altitude. The PPI display was taken from the British Coast Artillery Number 2 radar. The system proved to have poor altitude performance above 20,000 feet (6,100 m), but was still useful enough that an order for twenty sets was placed by the US forces.

Development of an improved model, LW/GCI Mark II, began in March 1944. This modified the 602 transmitter for improved reliability, added a preamplifier on the receiver to improve its sensitivity, and changed the antenna system to use three arrays of 2 by 12 dipoles which offered both better height measure and more angular resolution. Although the improvements were considerable, only limited production was started due to the imminent arrival of new units operating in the microwave range.

=== Height finding ===
A somewhat more limited update started in January 1943 to add height finding to the existing LW/AW sets. The LW/AWH Mark I was essentially two Mark IA antennas stacked on top of each other. By connecting to one antenna or the other, the lobes in the reception patterns shifted vertically and allowed the operator to calculate altitude. Only four units were produced in favour of microwave systems.

When the microwave systems arrived, they required two separate radars, one for PPI direction and separate systems for height finding. The system massed 35 long tons (36 t) compared to the 2 long tons (2.0 t) limit for operations in the South Pacific. This led to efforts to develop a new lightweight height finder, using a locally-designed cavity magnetron operating at 25 cm wavelength. Work on this LW/AWH Mark III began in February 1944. The naming was retained despite it being entirely dissimilar to the earlier models.

=== Later use ===
With the ending of the war, US radar systems that were being built in huge numbers were suddenly surplus, and sold off for very low prices. The AN/TPS-1 replaced older units like the LW/AW very quickly in many forces. This, in turn, led to the LW/AW becoming surplus as well, and finding use in secondary roles. The Department of Civil Aviation installed a LW/AW at Essendon Airport in Melbourne, at that time the busiest airport in Australia. The installation did not prove useful, and was later replaced by an ex-Royal Navy Type 276 radar under the name Aerodrome Control Radar.

== Description ==
=== Physical description ===
A stated goal of the system was that no single part would mass more than 200 pounds (91 kg). This was relatively easy for most of the electronics and the antenna systems, but was more difficult for the power supply, which consisted of a 5 kW generator run by the engine from a Ford 10. This too was ultimately broken down into parts, consisting of the engine, the alternator and flywheel, radiator, exhaust along with various other parts, underlying chassis, and the control panel. Only two of these ultimately went over the desired mass limits, the engine at 250 lbs and the alternator and flywheel at 450. In almost every case, the units could not be landed at a pier, or even on the beach, most were required to offload outside of a reef and then be carried ashore. For this reason, all of the packs were watertight.

Setup at the site started with the operations tent, which used a steel space-frame that could be lifted into position and then covered with the tent fabric. The uppermost part of the framework consisted of a square metal plate containing a bearing. The antenna support consisted of a turntable that sat on the floor of the tent and had a mast projecting upward and through the bearing at the top. The antenna was then built up on top of this mast. The antenna support structure consisted of eight separate steel frameworks that looked similar to scaffolding and were assembled into a two-high, four-wide arrangement. There were two different support designs, one that was thicker and formed the inner portion and connected to the mast, and a thinner section that formed the outer "wings". When assembled, the framework was roughly lenticular, thick in the center and thin at the sides. Four dipole antenna elements were then connected to the face of each support and wired together at the center using 330 Ohm twin-lead. This produced an eight-wide, four-high array.

The electronics were packaged into two large chassis, placed one each on either side of the mast. The entire equipment section rotated together on the turntable, along with the two operator's chairs, in order to turn the antenna for searching. The cabinet on the right, as seen from the operator's side, housed the radio receivers and cathode ray tube (CRT) displays and was the main operator's station. The cabinet on the left contained the transmitter and other radio equipment. The operator at this station was primarily tasked with rotating the antenna using a large handwheel on the mast.

The Mark IA differed only in detail, adding the IFF antennas on top. This consisted of a transmitter antenna mounted directly on top of the existing antenna. This was similar in size and shape as any single framework from the main antenna. Above this was a much smaller receiver, as well as a horizontal square metal mesh that prevented the signals from the antennas below being seen in the receiver. The Mark III was otherwise identical, differing only in the electronics in the cabinets. The GCI versions differed largely by adding a new triangular framework between the two rows, raising the upper two rows of dipoles higher into the air.

In the field, the GCI systems proved to have many problems, and the Mark II versions replaced the original tent with a plywood hut that rotated with the antennas. The entire assembly was then mounted on a large four-legged steel ground support similar to the systems used to support large anti-aircraft artillery guns.

=== Displays and interpretation ===
The original sets were used for early warning only. The operators would swing the antenna back and forth across likely approach routes and watch for echos that would appear on the 5 inches (130 mm) diameter CRT. This was arranged as it was in Chain Home, in A scope fashion, with a scale along the top and the blips deflecting the beam downward. The operator could read the range to the target by comparing the location of a blip to the scale above it. The scale was calibrated to 80 miles (130 km), although it was common to see returns beyond that under good conditions and ranges as great as 150 miles (240 km) were achieved on occasion.

The GCI units added a second CRT to act as a PPI display. This used selsyns connected to the antenna mast that physically rotated the CRT's deflection coils so that the line on the display was rotated to the same angle as the antenna. The same time base generator was used as the A scope, but adjusted so that the line it created only covered half of the display and was moved so it started from the center and drew outwards. Combined with the angle adjustment, this created the classic "sweeping line" type of radar display with blips appearing as dots at a given distance and angle from the station. As both the target and the attacking fighters were visible at the same time, the operator could easily direct the fighters towards the targets. The original A scope now served primarily as the height-finding system, displaying the returns from the two antenna arrays at the same time, causing two blips to appear for each target. The distance between the two gave a measure of the angle above the horizon.
