= SCR-602 =

US mobile early-warning radar during WWII

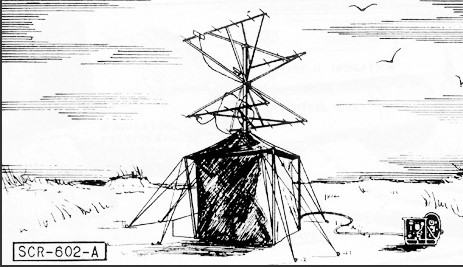
- SCR-602
- Country of origin: United States
- Introduced: 1943
- Type: 2D air-search
- Frequency: 176 MHz-202 MHz
- PRF: 400 Hz
- Pulsewidth: 2 microseconds
- RPM: 5 RPM
- Range: 70 miles (110 km)
- Azimuth: 0–360°
- Power: 100 kW peak

The SCR-602 (Set Complete Radio or Signal Corps Radio) model 602, also known as the AN/TPS-3, was a mobile lightweight, medium-range early-warning radar utilized by the United States and its allies during World War II. The radar was originally designed for use during the initial stages of an amphibious assault or military operation where its lightweight relative to other radar systems was a distinct advantage. Once larger radars such as the SCR-270 or AN/TPS-1 came online the SCR-602 could also be used to fill in gaps in radar coverage.

Early versions of the SCR-602 were based on the British AMES Type 6, an ad-hoc system developed by adapting the electronics and antennas from the airborne anti-submarine ASV Mk. II radar. This produced a small and robust radar that could be quickly moved and set up. This proved highly useful in the field and led to requests by the US Army Air Corps for a similar system. The 602 was initially built in Canada while improved versions were being developed in the US. By 1944 these newer versions had matured and took over from the earlier systems in both US and Allied use.

Numerous variations of the SCR-602 were manufactured during the war. It was utilized by the United States, United Kingdom and Australia. In the post-war era, these were generally replaced by the AN/TPS-1.

== Developing the radar ==
Development of the SCR-602 began in 1942 at the behest of Colonel Gordon P. Saville of the United States Army Air Corps. With delays to the manufacture and fielding of both the SCR-588 and SCR-527, the Air Corps was quickly seeking another radar for ground-controlled interception. This new radar was an adaptation of the United Kingdom's Chain Home Low radar. The Signal Corps was asked to develop a lightweight assault-type radar that could be both air transportable and hand-carried as well as have a range of over 100 miles on enemy bombardment aircraft. Prior to this request, the Air Force relied on the British lightweight warning (LW) radar, which the Signal Corps studied for ideas. After testing the VT-158 in various existing sets such as the SCR-268, a team led by Captain John Marchetti incorporated the VT-158 in a new system designated as the SCR-602. The original SCR-602, known as SCR-602-T1 for "Type 1", was almost an exact copy of the British LW radar. With the implementation of the VT-158, Marchetti's team developed the SCR-602-T8 (Type 8), which was based on a modified SCR-268 used in the Canal Zone. In order to prove that the newly developed SCR-602-T8 was air transportable, the Signal Corps flew the first laboratory model in a Douglas B-18 Bolo from Newark Airport to a test site in Orlando, Florida on 27 February 1943. Upon arriving at its destination, the SCR-602-T8 was set up and calibrated for testing. At the end of the tests, the engineers determined that the model had a range in excess of 110 miles and could be mass-produced.

The SCR-602-T8, which was designated as the AN/TPS-3, soon became the most successful variant of the SCR-602 model. Consisting of a 10-ft parabolic reflector antenna with a horizontal polarized dipole radiator at its focus and a console with an A-scope and a PPI-scope, the AN/TPS-3 became widely used by Army and Marine forces for early warning at beachheads, isolated areas, and captured air bases. Furthermore, the AN/TPS-3 could be assembled and put on the air by a crew of four men in thirty minutes, making it easy to deploy. Many Japanese kamikaze aircraft attacks were reportedly foiled by this radar. By 1944, 900 sets of the SCR-602-T8 were manufactured by Zenith Radio Corporation, and the accompanying VT-158's were produced by Eitel-McCullough, Inc., a manufacturer of high-frequency transmitting tubes located near San Francisco. However, the exact number of VT-158's produced throughout the war remains unknown.

== Technical description ==
The radar utilized the BC-800-B IFF receiver/transponder.

== Operational history ==
The SCR-602 was developed in time to be utilized by the U.S. Army during the invasion of North Africa in November 1942.

== See also ==
- Joint Electronics Type Designation System – Unclassified designation system for United States military electronic equipment
- List of radars
- List of AN/TPS- radar systems
- List of U.S. Signal Corps Vehicles
- List of military electronics of the United States
