= AN/TPS =

AN/TPS is a series of US military transportable search radars. They include:

- AN/TPS-1
- AN/TPS-3
- AN/TPS-10
- AN/TPS-32
- AN/TPS-43
- AN/TPS-44
- AN/TPS-58
- AN/TPS-59
- AN/TPS-63
- AN/TPS-70
- AN/TPS-72
- AN/TPS-75
- AN/TPS-77
- AN/TPS-80 Ground/Air Task Oriented Radar
