= List of Australian military equipment of World War II =

At the onset of the Second World War Australia had a relatively underdeveloped manufacturing sector and was still largely dependent on the United Kingdom. As a result, the majority of Australia's military weapons and equipment were initially imported from the United Kingdom or the United States. However, as the war progressed, many of these imported items were gradually replaced by locally produced versions, as Australia's industrial capacity expanded to meet the demands of the conflict.

== Knives and bayonet ==
=== Bayonets ===
- Pattern 1907 bayonet
- M1917 bayonet

== Small arms ==
=== Pistols (manual and semi-automatic) ===
- Enfield No. 2 Mk I
- Webley Mk VI revolver
- Webley Mk IV revolver
- Browning Hi-Power P35
- Smith & Wesson Victory
- Beaumont-Adams revolver (Volunteer Defence Corps)
- Webley M1872 Bull Dog (Volunteer Defence Corps)
- Colt Model 1851 Navy (Volunteer Defence Corps)
- Smith & Wesson No.3 (Volunteer Defence Corps)

=== Automatic pistols and submachine guns ===
- Owen Gun
- STEN submachine gun
- Thompson submachine gun
- Austen submachine gun

=== Rifles ===
- Lee–Enfield No. 1 Mk III*
- Lee–Enfield No. 4 Mk I
- Lee–Enfield No. 5 Mk I jungle carbine
- Pattern P1914 No. 3 Mk I
- Charlton automatic rifle
- Lee-Metford Mk II (Volunteer Defence Corps)
- Martini-Henry Mk IV (Volunteer Defence Corps)

=== Grenades and grenade launchers ===
- Mills bomb No. 36M
- No. 68 AT grenade (A British rifle grenade used during the North Africa Campaign)

== Flamethrowers ==
- M2 flamethrower
- Flamethrower, Portable, No 2

== Machine guns ==
=== Infantry and dual-purpose machine guns ===
- Vickers Mk I machine gun
- Lewis Mk I light machine gun
- Bren Mk 1 light machine gun
- Hotchkiss M1909 Mk I Benét–Mercié light machine gun
- Browning M1919A4 machine gun

=== Vehicle and aircraft machine guns ===
- M2 Browning machine gun
- Lewis Mk III gun
- Besa machine gun

== Artillery ==
=== Infantry mortars ===
- Stokes mortar
- Ordnance SBML 2-inch mortar
- Ordnance ML 3 inch Mortar
- Ordnance ML 4.2 inch Mortar

=== Heavy mortars & rocket launchers ===
- Matilda Hedgehog - An experimental late-war rocket launcher attached to Matilda II

=== Field artillery ===
- Ordnance QF 15-pounder Mk I
- Ordnance QF 13-pounder
- Ordnance QF 18-pounder Mk2, Mk4
- Ordnance BLC 15-pounder
- RML 2.5 inch Mountain Gun
- QF 3.7-inch mountain howitzer
- QF 4.5-inch howitzer
- QF 5.25 inch gun
- BL 10-pounder Mountain Gun
- Ordnance QF 25-pounder
- Ordnance QF 25-pounder Short

=== Fortress and siege guns ===
- BL 60-pounder gun
- BL 4 inch naval gun Mk 1
- BL 4.5-inch Medium Field Gun
- BL 4.7 inch /45 naval gun
- BL 5.5-inch Medium Gun
- BL 6-inch 26 cwt howitzer
- BL 6-inch 30 cwt howitzer

=== Anti-tank guns ===
- Ordnance QF 2-pounder Mk IX/X
- Ordnance QF 6-pounder Mk II
- Ordnance QF 17-pounder

== Anti-tank weapons (besides anti-tank guns) ==
- Boys anti-tank rifle Mk I, Mk II
- PIAT

== Anti-aircraft weapons ==
=== Light anti-aircraft guns ===
- Vickers QF 2-pounder naval gun (pom-pom)
- Rolls-Royce QF 2-pounder naval gun
- QF 3-pounder Hotchkiss
- Oerlikon 20 mm cannon
- Bofors 40 mm gun

=== Heavy anti-aircraft guns ===
- QF 6-pounder 6 cwt Hotchkiss
- QF 6 pounder 10 cwt gun
- QF 12 pounder 12 cwt naval gun
- QF 12-pounder 12 cwt AA gun
- QF 13-pounder 6 cwt AA gun
- QF 3-inch 20 cwt
- QF 3.7-inch AA gun
- QF 4 inch Mk V naval gun
- QF 4 inch Mk XVI naval gun
- QF 4.5-inch Mk I – V naval gun

== Vehicles ==
=== Tankettes ===
- CTLS-4TAC

=== Tanks ===
- Sentinel tank (only Australian production)
- Fiat M11/39 (Captured during the North Africa Campaign)
- Fiat M13/40 (Captured during the North Africa Campaign)
- Vickers Light Tank Mk VI
- Renault R35
- M3 Stuart
- Medium tank M3 Grant
- Matilda II
- Vickers 6-Ton
- Yeramba
- Churchill tank

==== Tank-based ====
- Matilda Frog – A flame tank built on Matilda II chassis

=== Armored cars ===
- Dingo (scout car)
- Rhino Heavy Armoured Car
- Rover Light Armoured Car
- S1 Scout Car
- T17E1 Staghound armoured car

=== Armored carriers ===
- Universal Carrier

=== Engineering and command ===
- Matilda Dozer – A Matilda II with a bulldozer type blade for clearing jungle obstacles
- AEC armoured command vehicle – A vehicle used to command on a battalion and company level

=== Trucks ===
- Canadian Military Pattern truck Ford F30 (by Ford Australia)
- GMC CCKW (Lend-Lease vehicles)

=== Passenger cars ===
- Willys MB (Lend-Lease utility and personnel transport)
- Chevrolet Master (Staff and command cars)

=== Motorcycles ===
- Harley Davidson 42 WLA
- BSA WM20

=== Tractors & prime movers ===
- CMP FAT – A vehicle utilized as a field artillery tractor

=== Miscellaneous vehicles ===
- Landing Vehicle Tracked

== Navy ships and war vessels ==
- List of ships of the Second World War

== Aircraft ==
- de Havilland Mosquito
- Bristol Beaufort
- Bristol Beaufighter
- CAC Woomera (CA-4/CA-11)
- CAC Wirraway (CA-3)
- CAC Wackett (CA-6)
- CAC Boomerang (CA-12)
- North American P-51 Mustang (license built as CA-17 Mustang)
- de Havilland Express
- Curtiss P-40 Kittyhawk
- Supermarine Spitfire
- PBY Catalina – A maritime patrol plane
- Douglas A-20 Havoc – A twin engine light bomber

== Radars ==
Light Weight Air Warning Radar – A radar used in northern Australia and New Guinea theaters

== Missiles & bombs ==
RP-3 – An air to ground rocket projectile used by the RAAF

== Cartridges and shells ==
- .303 British
- 9×19mm Parabellum
- .38 S&W
- .455 Webley
- .30-06 Springfield (Lend-Lease)
- .55 Boys
- .50 BMG (Lend-Lease)
- 7.92×57mm Mauser (Used for the Besa machine gun found in British tanks)

== See also ==
- List of military equipment of Australia
