= IFF Mark X =

Identification friend or foe system

IFF Mark X was the NATO standard military identification friend or foe transponder system from the early 1950s until it was slowly replaced by the IFF Mark XII in the 1970s. It was also adopted by ICAO, with some modifications, as the civilian air traffic control (ATC) secondary radar (SSR) transponder. The X in the name does not mean "tenth", but "eXperimental". Later IFF models acted as if it was the tenth in the series and used subsequent numbers.

For most of World War II the standard IFF system used by the allied air forces was the IFF Mark III. Mark III responded on the same frequency as the trigger signal, returning a selected pulse pattern. Originally, the Mark X was simply a version of Mark III operating at a higher frequency, which has several practical advantages. Three return patterns, or Modes, were available. As it was being introduced, the new Selective Identification Feature, or SIF, allowed the response signal to be modified with bit encoding, providing the ability for each aircraft to produce a unique response using octal digits. This was initially handled through a separate box that connected to the original Mark X. For a brief time in 1957 this was known as IFF Mark XI before becoming IFF Mark X (SIF).

As the civil aviation market grew in the 1950s, Mark X was selected as the standard transponder system as the Air Traffic Control Radar Beacon System, or ATCRBS. For this role, a new series of four Modes was introduced, A through D. A is essentially identical to Mode 3, and these are now referred to as Mode 3/A. Mode C responds with a four-digit code encoding the pressure altitude in 100 foot (30 m) increments. Combining information from a radar with Mode A and C responses, the ATC system can build a complete picture of the airspace without the need for height finders or 3D radars. Using Mark X for the civilian role also allowed existing military users to be routed within the civilian network, as well as allowing civilian aircraft to use an existing and well-tested transponder design.

Mark X retained a key problem that was present in all IFF systems to date; the aircraft transponder would respond to any interrogation signal on the proper frequency with no way to tell if it was a friendly transmitter. This allows an enemy force to query the transponders and use triangulation to determine their location, or simply count the responses to look for increased activity. Military users had long desired a system that encoded both the interrogation and response, allowing the transponders to ignore signals from interrogators that did not present the right code. This led to the development of IFF Mark XII and its associated Mode 4 which began to be deployed in 1970.

== History ==
=== Mark III ===
The first IFF system to see widespread multinational use was the British IFF Mark III, which appeared in early 1942 with the Royal Air Force and then used for the rest of the war by the US and Canada as well. This was a simple system that listened for broadcasts on a narrow band of frequencies, amplified the incoming signal using a regenerative receiver, and rebroadcast the result. The regenerative design was extremely simple, often consisting of a single vacuum tube. The ground station used an "interrogator" to send out pulses in synchronicity with a radar unit, and mixed the received signal into the one from the radar to produce a unified display. On most radar displays, the IFF signal would lengthen the "blip" or cause additional blips to appear.

Mark III had the serious limitation that it would respond to signals from any broadcast in the 176 MHz range. It was long feared that the Germans would send out their own interrogation pulses to trigger the IFF, and then use a radio direction finder to locate the aircraft. The British did this to German night fighters using a system known as Perfectos, forcing the Germans to turn off their IFFs and causing many friendly fire incidents. It seemed logical that the Germans would return the favour, but this was rarely the case; while ground-based radio reconnaissance units were known to track British aircraft by their IFF on occasion, their success was greatly mitigated by turning the IFF transponder off while over enemy airspace. The Germans could not do the same, as they were almost always flying over their own airspace.

A more practical concern was that the IFF signals were in the middle of the widely used existing VHF radar bands; moving to a new frequency would help reduce potential interference. Moving to a higher frequency would have the added advantage of allowing the use of smaller antennas. Another issue with Mark III was that the transponder responded on the same frequency as the interrogation pulse, so other IFFs might hear the response signal and trigger their own, resulting in cascade of replies. This was particularly problematic near airports, where aircraft clustered and could hear each other's signals. Using separate send and receive frequencies would solve this, but the regenerative design worked by feeding back a received signal, so it could not be easily adapted to respond on a different frequency.

=== US efforts, Mark IV ===
The US Naval Research Laboratory (NRL) had also been considering the IFF concept, and had come up with a concept similar to Mark III in that it used its own private frequency for interrogations, 470 MHz. Unlike the British designs, the response signal was on a separate frequency, 493.5 MHz. This avoided one IFF triggering another, but at the cost of requiring a complete separate transmitter system. When the US and British formed the joint Combined Research Group at the NRL, this system was given the name Mark IV.

A complication was that the response frequency was close enough to the 600 MHz frequency of the German Würzburg radars that there was concern that those radar's pulses might trigger the transponder, causing a new blip to appear on the Würzburg's radar display and thus immediately revealing their operational frequency. With British systems already in widespread use, the decision was made to adopt Mark II and Mark III for US aircraft.

In 1942, the Combined Research Group began the development of a new system based on the basic Mark IV pattern but with a further increase in operational frequency to 1.03 GHz for the interrogation and 1.09 GHz for the responses. This Mark V was to be the basis for IFF worldwide in the post-war era, and so was also known as the United Nations Beacon, or UNB. UNB adaptors for existing Mark III sets were produced and saw service with the US forces, but were not adopted elsewhere. The UK withdrew from the program in October 1945, believing another war was at least ten years off. The US only used UNB for a brief time because a new experimental concept, known as Mark X, was rapidly maturing.

=== Mark X ===
The main difference between Mark X and earlier IFF systems was the use of two pulses in the interrogation rather than one. A single pulse had been used in the past because the original interrogation signal was the radar beam sweeping past the aircraft, and these were single pulses of energy. With the IFF systems now working on completely different frequencies, compatibility with existing radars was no longer required, so for the Mark X a system using two pulses was adopted.

There were two advantages to this system. The first was that an enemy interrogator would have to match both the frequency and timing of the pulses to trigger a response. This offered a small amount of additional security. Much more important, however, was that by varying the timing of the pulses, different replies could be triggered in the airborne transponder. The original design had three such "modes", Mode 1 was triggered by the interrogator by sending the two pulses 3 μs apart, Mode 2 was 5 μs and Mode 3 was 8 μs (all ±0.2 μs).

The response to these interrogations remained simple; a successful interrogation on Mode 1 or 3 caused a single pulse to be sent in reply, very shortly after the interrogation was received. Since this arrived back at the radar station after the return of the original radar pulse, this signal caused a second blip to appear on the radar screen at a slightly further distance. Mode 2 was similar, but returned two pulses from aircraft and a single delayed pulse from ships.

The aircraft transponder had a switch that set which Mode it was listening for, and would only respond to enquiries for that mode. In practice, the modes were used to identify individual aircraft. In UK use, for instance, most aircraft would set their transponder to Mode 1, which would provide basic IFF indication on their "blip" on the radar display. The flight leader would instead select Mode 3, thereby allowing the ground operator to sort out the entire formation from the individual aircraft within. Finally, Mode 2 was selected on demand to allow the operator to identify a specific aircraft.

In addition to the basic Modes, the system also included an emergency response feature which was selected by the aircraft. When turned on, the aircraft always returned four pulses in reply to an interrogation, no matter what mode the ground station selected.

Although they had withdrawn from the UNB, the UK kept in touch with their US counterparts, and officially adopted Mark X in October 1949, followed by the Canadians the next year. RAF representatives were invited to attend the testing in late 1951, by which point they had already contracted Ferranti to develop equipment that worked on both Mark III and Mark X. Due to delays on both sides of the Atlantic, it was not until the early 1960s that Mark X support was truly universal.

=== SIF ===
Allied systems had started as transponders which simply reflected the original radar pulse and were unable to encode any sort of customized response message. The US had been studying encoding more data into the return signal during the war, but ultimately felt getting a new system into service as quickly as possible was more important than improving its capabilities, so the original Mark X differed only in simple ways from Mark III.

While development of the basic Mark X was still ongoing, development also began on the new Selective Identification Feature, or SIF. This system was initially implemented as a separate box that plugged into the Mark X and modified its return signals. Instead of two pulses, the SIF unit returned a "pulse train" that contained multiple pulses between start and stop "framing" pulses. Each pulse was 0.45 μs in duration and 1.45 μs apart, and the train as a whole was 20.3 microseconds long. Each group of three pulses is used to encode an octal digit, 0 to 7. In Mode 1 and 3, two sets of three pulses are used, while Mode 2 used all four sets of pulses in the train.

To help identify individual aircraft, ground operators would tell the aircraft to set their IFF to a particular Mode, and then select a two-digit code on the SIF box. In Mode 3, all 64 responses (00 to 77) were possible, but in Mode 1, the second digit was only 0 to 3, for a total of 32 codes. (Note: Gough states there are 30 codes, but that is likely accounting for reserved codes like 77.) Emergency mode remained, but only worked when interrogated by Mode 1 from the ground station. To indicate an emergency on Mode 3, the user instead dialled in code 77. To ensure the emergency code would be picked up by most interrogators, the operator would set the IFF to emergency and dial 77, thus responding with the same set of pulses on both Mode 1 and 3.

The longer response in Mode 2 was used solely by military users, (Note: The mode may have been used solely by Air Defense Command in the US, but it is not clear.) allowing them to identify individual aircraft. The four digits provided a total of 4096 possible codes, although 7700 was used for emergency, producing the same emergency response as above.

=== ATCRBS ===
In 1953, the Mark X frequencies and SIF coding systems were released for civilian use worldwide. In 1956, ICAO selected Mark X as the basis for worldwide civil aviation. Selecting the existing system had the advantage of allowing the use of well-tested equipment as well as allowing existing military transponders to work within the larger civilian network.

Although there was some use of Mark X in this role, especially in Europe, it was not widespread. In the US, the Federal Aviation Administration was working on a system using 3D radar to measure altitudes and a computerized flight information system that they believed would revolutionize the industry. Development was still far from completed when the 16 December 1960 New York mid-air collision occurred, in which a United Airlines DC-8 overshot its assigned holding pattern and collided with a Trans World Airlines Super Constellation. Although the accident was ultimately the fault of the DC-8 crew, among the contributing factors was that the air traffic controllers were unable to positively identify the aircraft.

In the aftermath of the accident, the FAA came under considerable criticism from both the government and the civilian airlines. On 8 March 1961, President Kennedy launched Project Beacon to address these concerns. The Research and Development Bureau of the FAA continued to press for the development of their new systems, but the air traffic controllers told the FAA to abandon their 3D radar and instead pressed for modifications to the existing systems and transponders. The final report agreed with the controllers; instead of new systems, the transponders would be upgraded to provide altitude information. These would be known as the Air Traffic Control Radar Beacon System, or ATCRBS.

ATCRBS introduced several civilian Modes, A through D. Mode A remained identical to the original Mode 3, with the exception that civilian aircraft would be provided with dials to allow all four digits to be used instead of just the first two. Additionally, the new Mode C returned the aircraft's altitude, thereby eliminating the need for a separate height finder radar or 3D radar. Now a single sweep of the radar would locate the aircraft by its direct reflection, identify it by its Mode A response, and return its altitude through Mode C, updating all of this information continuously.

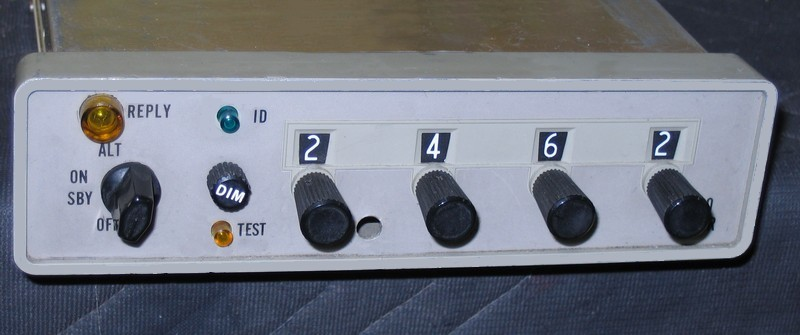
A light aircraft transponder, with dials to set all four digits of the Mode 3/A response.

The system is otherwise similar to SIF, using the same pulse train response format and octal encoding. In Mode A, the only difference from Mode 3 is that all four digits are sent, in the same fashion as military Mode 2. Using such a code means it would not be seen in military ground stations supporting only the older Mode 3, and for this reason, Mode A codes generally end with "00". For instance, the standard code to identify an aircraft flying under visual flight rules in North America is 1200, while the emergency code is, as with the military codes, 7700.

Military radars need to determine both the location and altitude of an enemy aircraft. A variety of methods were used to do this, often using several additional full-power height finding radars dedicated for this purpose, or using 3D radars of some complexity. This was not appropriate for civilian use, but determining altitude was still valuable for proper air traffic control spacing. To fill this need, ATCRVS added Mode C, which uses the same four-digit format, but uses the digits to encode the altitude instead of an identifier. By alternating their queries between Mode A and C, and storing the values between receptions, a radar site can use the radar's own reflection to locate the aircraft in space, the Mode A response to identify it, and the Mode C to determine the altitude.

In contrast to military users, civilian users may be asked to produce a complete four-digit code for Mode A responses. For uncontrolled aircraft, codes generally use only the first two digits so that they could also be read on older military ground equipment. For instance, the standard code to identify an aircraft flying under visual flight rules in North America is 1200, while emergency is, as with the military codes, 7700. Mode B and D remain unused.

=== Mark XII ===
In the military, Mark X had the significant drawback that it continued to respond to any interrogator, allowing it to be used by enemy forces to triangulate aircraft. This was used by North Vietnam to track US aircraft movements. When this was noticed, pilots were told to turn off their IFF while over enemy territory, which led to restrictions on traffic control over enemy airspace.

As early as 1960, some development work began in the US on an encoding system that would work within the existing IFF network. This became IFF Mark XII, which added cryptographic keys to the interrogation and response codes. Now an airborne transponder could check to see if the interrogation pulse was from a valid friendly source, and ignore anyone that did not present the proper code. Additionally, response formats were modified to allow more information to be returned. Mark XII began to be introduced by the US in the early 1970s, and gradually replaced Mark X. Outside the US, where ongoing air wars against a sophisticated enemy were not ongoing, the adoption of Mark XII was not nearly as rapid or widespread.

Another problem with Mark X, and its replacement Mark XII, is that it can be jammed by broadcasting on the known response frequencies. Work on a spread spectrum IFF Mark XV started in the US, but was cancelled in 1990 due to rising costs of the estimated 17,000 required units.

=== Mode S ===
As traffic levels further increased in very busy airspaces, even proper interrogations could trigger so many responses that there was no way to tell which response was from which aircraft. This led to the introduction of IFF Mode S. In Mode S, every aircraft has its own unique 24-bit code that it responds with when queried with the correct interrogation signal. This allows the ground station to periodically send out a signal similar to Mode 3/A, but receive unique codes for every aircraft. From then on, the interrogator can send out position and altitude calls with specific codes, thereby having only the selected aircraft respond. Mode S also adds a series of long response formats that allow text messages and other information to be sent.

== Description ==
=== Interrogation format ===
The interrogation signal, sometimes known as the uplink format, consists of two 0.8 μs long pulses on 1030 MHz. The time between the pulses defines which mode is being queried. Mode 1 had two pulses 3 μs apart (±0.2 μs), Mode 2 was 5 μs and Mode 3 was 8 μs. The civil B, C and D were 17, 21 and 25 μs apart. Mode S adds a P4 pulse after P1 and P3.

Ground-based interrogators normally cycle through the different modes in order to collect complete information, this is known as the interlace pattern. For civilian sites, the pattern is normally A,C,A,C... For military users the pattern is typically 1,3/A,C,2,3/A,C... but some use 1,2,3/A,C,1,2,...

=== Response format ===
In the original pre-SIF system, the response to a properly received interrogation pulse is normally either one pulse in Mode 1 and 2, or two pulses in Mode 2. Turning on Emergency Mode produced four pulses in all modes.

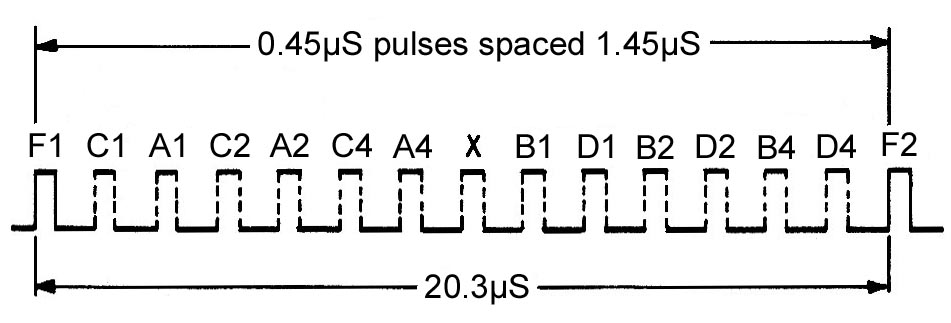
Mode A and C reply format.

For SIF-equipped systems, the response to a properly received interrogation pulse is a chain of 0.45 μs (±0.1 μs) long pulses 1.45 μs apart framed by start and stop pulses. The pulses are labeled F1 and F2 for start and stop, and A1, B1, C1, A2, B2... for the response pulses. The responses are interleaved together, C1, A1, C2,...A4 followed by B1, D1... for a total of 12 possible pulses in four octal digits, A, B, C and D. A single extra "X" pulse in the center is left unused, so the total packet with framing is 20.2 μs long.

The pulses were timed out originally through the use of delay lines. The initial specification had been for 3 μs between pulses in a given digit, or 1.5 μs between the interleaved pulses of A/C or B/D. When the first sample delay lines arrived they were defective and delayed only 2.9 μs, resulting in the 1.45 μs timing between pulses.

Military Mode 1 transmits two digits, A and B, leaving the rest of the possible pulses empty. Only a subset of possible combinations are possible, with the complete 0 to 7 for the first digit but only 0 to 3 for the second, allowing 32 codes between 00 and 73. This is sometimes known as the "mission signal" and set by the air controllers prior to flight. In Mode 2 and 3, all 4096 possible 4-digit codes from 0000 to 7777 are allowed.

For Mode 3/A, the value of each of the digits, 0 to 7, is set through front-panel switches. For civilian use this is a code provided by the ATC controllers. Most general aviation aircraft in North America are told to "squawk 1200", meaning that they should set their transponder to 1200, whereas in the rest of the world, 7000 is used for this same purpose. Three special-purpose codes are also used, 7500 means the aircraft is being hijacked, 7600 means their voice radio set is not working, and 7700 is a general emergency.

For mode C, the altitude is encoded using Gillham code, using 11 bits. The lowest possible code is 000000000001, representing an altitude of -1200 feet. Every 100 feet of additional altitude above -1200 adds 1 to the total, so, for instance, 000000110100 is 1200 feet.

SIF also adds a single additional optional pulse, Special Purpose Identification or SPI, which is sent 4.35 μs after the F2. SPI is triggered manually by the transponder operator to identify a single aircraft by pressing a button. The SPI continues to be broadcast for 18 seconds. Under ICAO rules, SPI should only be added to Mode 3/A.
