= Organ-pipe scanner =

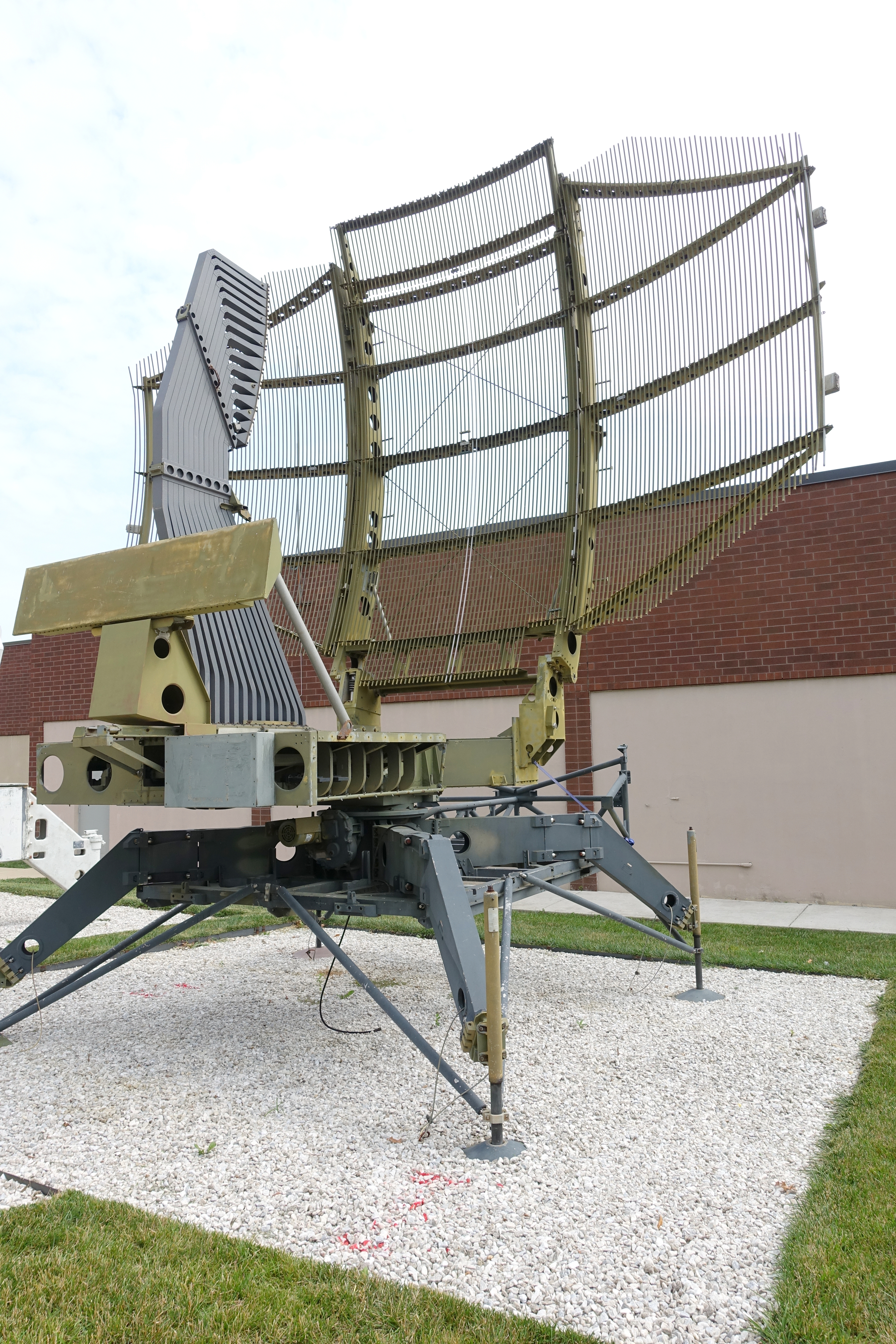
AN/TPS-43 with fifteen-horn elevation scanner

An organ-pipe scanner is a system used in some radar systems to provide scanning in azimuth or elevation without moving the antenna. It consists of a series of waveguides and feed horns arranged in front of a shaped reflector, each one positioned to reflect the beam in a different direction. The wave guides meet at a central point where a small rotating waveguide feeds the microwave signal into each of the horns in turn as it rotates past them.

The system was found in a number of 1950s and 60's era radars, notably the US's AN/FPS-50 radar used in the BMEWS network, and the High Speed Aerial of the UK's RX12874 Passive Detection System. The concept fell from use with the increasing use of phased array, which provided a similar steering mechanism in purely electronic form with no moving parts.

A similar concept is the Foster scanner, which is typically found on lower-power systems like counter-battery radars.
