= AN/TPS-58 =

AN/TPS-58 Moving-Target-Locating Radar (MTLR) is a vehicle-mounted radar set used by the United States Army for general surveillance and artillery burst detection. The AN/TPS-58 weighs 3,500 pounds and utilizes a truncated parabolic reflector (65 × 52 cm) antenna. The accuracy of the AN/TPS-58 is 50m with a detection range 12 km for personnel or 20 km for vehicles.

The mission of the AN/TPS-58 MTLR is to detect, locate, and identify moving ground targets with sufficient accuracy for attack by friendly weapon systems. The radar also can vector friendly patrols to specified areas. The MTLRs are usually employed by division artillery in general support of the division and are therefore seldom directly controlled by cannon battalions. However, they may be attached to battalions for support only, such as security, survey, and Classes I and II.

The appointed depot for the AN/TPS-58B radars is Sacramento Army Depot.

In accordance with the Joint Electronics Type Designation System (JETDS), the "AN/TPS-58" designation represents the 58th design of an Army-Navy electronic device for ground transportable search radar system. The JETDS system also now is used to name all Department of Defense electronic systems.

== Variants ==
- AN/TPS-58A
- AN/TPS-58B

== See also ==
- List of AN/TPS- radar systems
- List of radars
- List of military electronics of the United States
