= AN/TPS-44 =

Military 2D air search radar

- Country of origin: United States of America
- Manufacturer: Cardion Electronics
- Frequency: 1.25 to 1.35 GHz
- PRF: Short Range (40 nmi (46 mi) - 80 nmi (92 mi)): 800 hz; Medium Range (120 nmi (140 mi)): 533 hz; Long Range (275 nmi (316 mi)): 267 hz
- Beamwidth: 4° (horizontal), 8° (vertical)
- Pulsewidth: 1.4 to 4.2 𝜇s
- RPM: 0 to 15 rpm (variable)
- Range: Short: 40 nmi (46 mi) - 80 nmi (92 mi); Medium: 120 nmi (140 mi); Long: 275 nmi (316 mi)
- Power: 1.0 MW peak power, 1.12kW average.

The AN/TPS-44 is a transportable 2-dimensional air search radar produced in the United States originally by Cardion Electronics. The main components of the system are a shelter (where the crew operates it) and the foldable antenna. These components are the two loads into which the system can be broken down, and packed into two M35 trucks for road transport, or airlifted via helicopter or cargo plane.

In accordance with the Joint Electronics Type Designation System (JETDS), the "AN/TPS-44" designation represents the 44th design of an Army-Navy electronic device for ground transportable search radar system. The JETDS system also now is used to name all Department of Defense electronic systems.

== Operational history ==
The AN/TPS-44 completed development in the early 1960s and entered US Air Force service in the late 1960s during the Vietnam War. It is still in service with the United States and other countries, including Argentina.

== Users ==
- Argentina - Argentine Army - In the early 1980s six sets were purchased, one set was lost in the Falklands War.
- Israel
- United States
  - United States Air Force;
  - United States Customs Service - At least six units acquired from the U.S.A.F. as of 7/3/1981, with two units requested for use along Arizona border as of 3/5/1972.

== See also ==
- List of radars
- AN/TPS-43 radar
- List of AN/TPS- radar systems
- List of military electronics of the United States
