= List of military equipment of Australia =

List of all military equipment ever used by Australia

This is a list of all military equipment ever used by Australia. It includes lists of equipment categorized by type, such as ships, as well as equipment used during specific time periods, including World War II.

== Weapons ==
- List of military weapons of Australia

== Aircraft ==
- List of aircraft of the Royal Australian Air Force

== Ships ==
- List of ships of the Royal Australian Navy

== World War II ==
- List of Australian military equipment of World War II

== Modern day ==
- List of equipment of the Australian Army
- List of current Royal Australian Air Force aircraft
- List of active Royal Australian Navy ships
