= AN/TPS-43 =

Military 3D early warning and tactical control radar

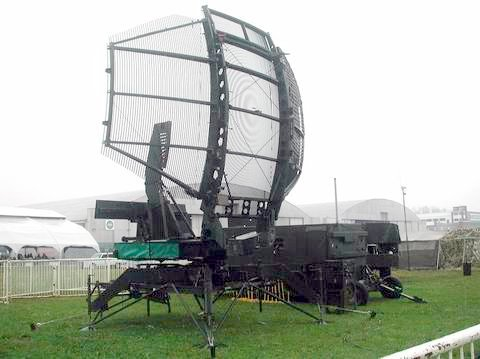
The AN/TPS-43 radar set

The AN/TPS-43 is a transportable air search 3D radar produced in the United States originally by Westinghouse Electric Corporation's Defense and Electronic Division, which was later purchased by Northrop Grumman. It is used primarily for early warning and tactical control, often for control over an associated surface-to-air missile battery or airfield. It is designed to be transported in two M35 cargo trucks and easily air-transportable on two pallets.

The TPS-43 uses multiple feed horns and an organ-pipe scanner to rapidly scan its pencil beam vertically while the entire antenna system rotates to scan in azimuth. By comparing the relative power of a return in one or more of the vertical feed horns, the target altitude can be determined. Since its introduction in 1966 it has undergone many modifications. In later versions, the organ-pipe was replaced by a stripline matrix to produce beamforming that had the same output pattern but had no moving parts. Many more upgrades were made to the transmitter and receiver as solid state electronics were able to handle increased power loads.

Among its notable uses were two examples owned by the Argentine Air Force that were moved to the Falkland Islands during the 1982 Falklands War. The example at Port Stanley Airport survived two attacks by AGM-45 Shrike missiles before being captured by British forces. It was repaired, upgraded, and then used by the Royal Air Force for many years.

== Description ==
In accordance with the Joint Electronics Type Designation System (JETDS), the "AN/TPS-43" designation represents the 43rd design of an Army-Navy electronic device for ground transportable search radar system. The JETDS system also now is used to name all Department of Defense electronic systems.

The AN/TPS-43 is a ground-based, non fixed (i.e.: transportable/ truck holdable) search radar. The entire system can be broken down and packed into two M35 trucks for road transport.

An updated version replacing the original shaped reflector and organ-pipe scanner with a phased array antenna was originally known as the TPS-43E2, but emerged as a much more modern system and was renamed the AN/TPS-75. TPS-75 is the current transportable air control and warning (AC&W) radar used by the United States Air Force.

== Variants ==
In addition to the basic TPS-43 several variants were developed.

- TPS-43A (antenna tilt; new IFF)
- TPS-43B (enlarged shelter; changes to transmitter)
- TPS-43C / 43CX (increased reliability; IFF improvements)
- TPS-43D / 43DX (ISLS added; maximum detection range increased)
- TPS-43E (major redesign; improvements to electronics, mechanics and shelter)
- TPS-43F / subvariants V1 to V6 (major redesign; enlarged shelter, improved electronics; increased reliability)
- TPS-43G (4 megawatt export version designed for Pakistan)
- TPS-43M (improved electronics; increased dynamic range; improved IFF incorporating several modules in a single unit)
- TPS-430

== Operational history ==
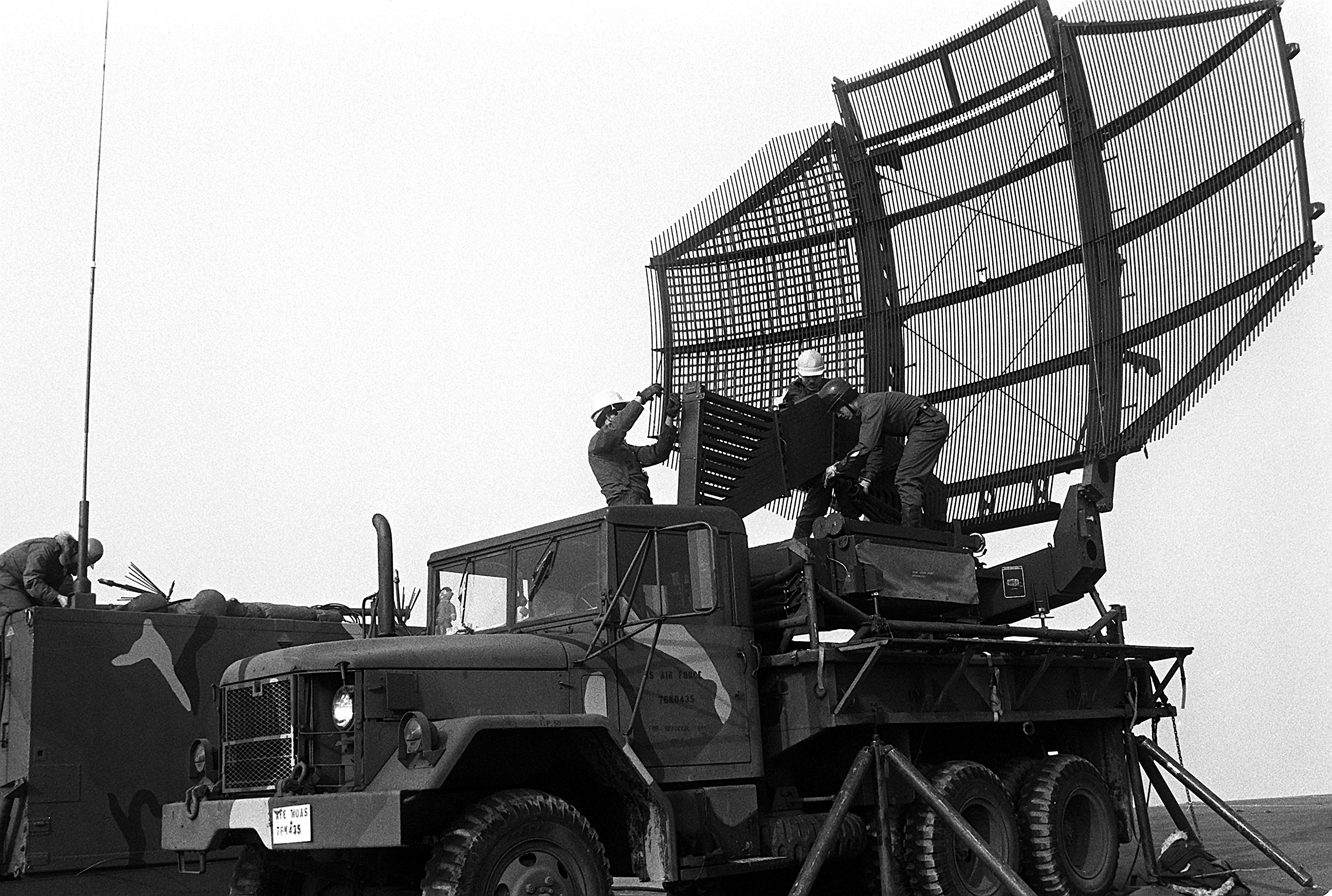
An AN/TPS-43E tactical three-dimensional radar system being set up, 4 January 1999

The AN/TPS-43 completed development in 1963 and entered US service in 1968.

This radar was deployed by the Argentine Air Force during the 1982 Falklands War to Stanley and survived two British attacks with AGM-45 Shrike anti radar missiles on May 31 and June 3. One of the radars was captured by British forces after the Argentine surrender and deployed at RAF Buchan. Another set installed at Rio Grande, in the mainland, was used to guide Argentine attacks on the British fleet.

== Users ==
- Argentine Air Force – In the early 1980s six sets were purchased, one was lost in the Falklands War.
- Bangladesh Air Force – 4 (Status Uncertain)
- Spanish Air and Space Force

== Specifications ==
- Weight (including shelter): < 7,500 lb (3,400 kg)
- Frequency range: 2.9 to 3.1 GHz (103 to 97 mm) (S-band)
- Pulse repetition frequency:

Fixed: 250 Hz
Staggered: Six PRF's around 250 Hz

- Pulse width: 6.5 microseconds
- Peak power: 4.0 MW
- Average power: 6.7 kW
- Beam width (horizontal): 1.1 degrees
- Beam width (vertical): 1.5 to 8.1 degrees; total 20 degree coverage; six stacked beams
- Antenna rotation rate: 6 rpm
- Maximum range: 240 nmi (280 mi; 440 km)
- Maximum display range: 280 mi (450 km)
- Cooling: 4 types of cooling; air, gas, oil and water
- Antenna characteristics:

Reflector aperture: 4.27 feet (1.30 m) high × 20 feet (6.1 m) wide

== See also ==
- List of radars
- AN/TPS-44 radar
- AN/TPS-75 radar
- List of AN/TPS- radar systems
- List of military electronics of the United States
