= AN/TPS-75 =

US military transportable aerospace control and warning PESA 3D radar

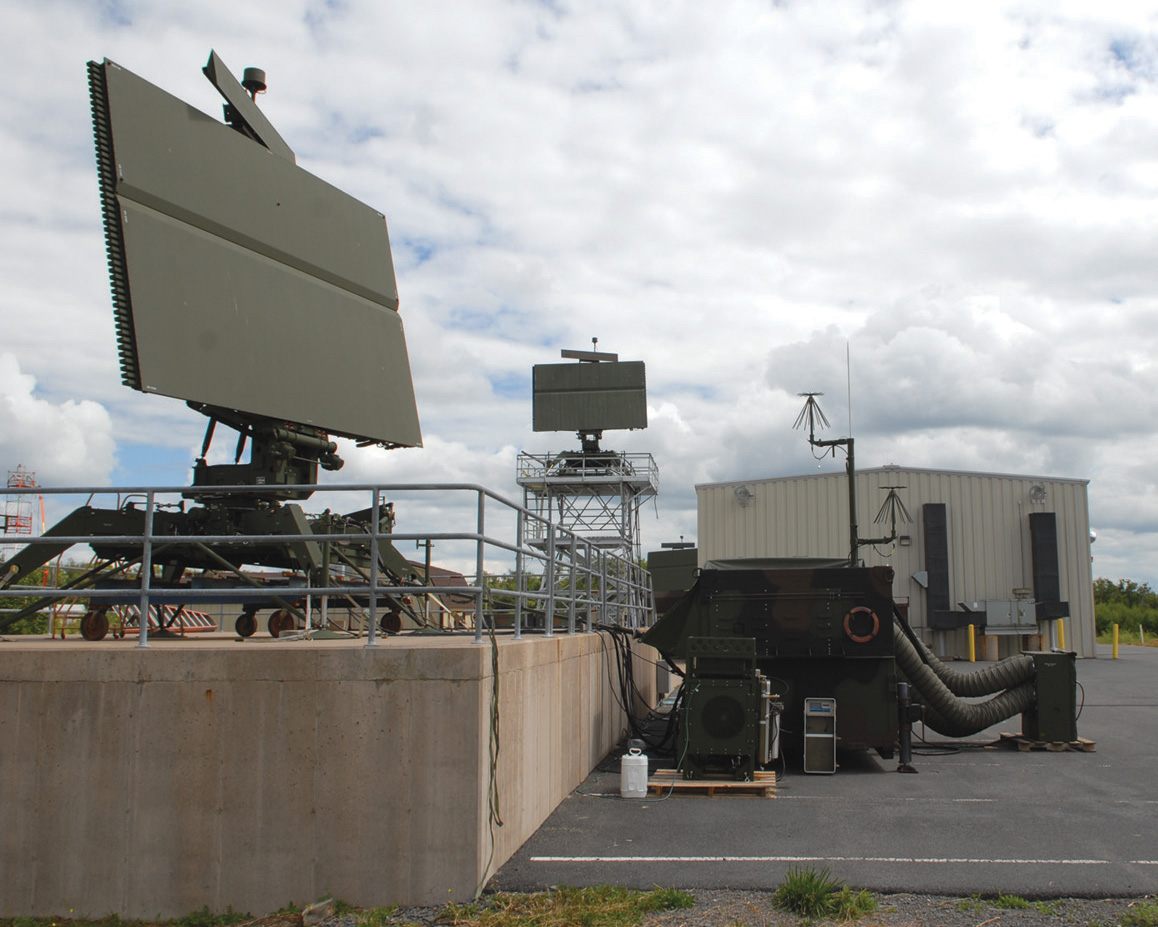
AN/TPS-75 radars deployed at Tobyhanna Army Depot

The AN/TPS-75 is a transportable passive electronically scanned array air search 3D radar produced in the United States. It was originally designated the TPS-43E2. Although the antenna is a radically new design from the AN/TPS-43, the radar van itself, which houses the transmitter, receiver processors, and displays is very similar to the older TPS-43E2. It is produced in the United States originally by Westinghouse Defense and Electronic Division, which was later purchased by Northrop Grumman.

== Description ==
The AN/TPS-75 radar antenna packed on a 5-ton truck

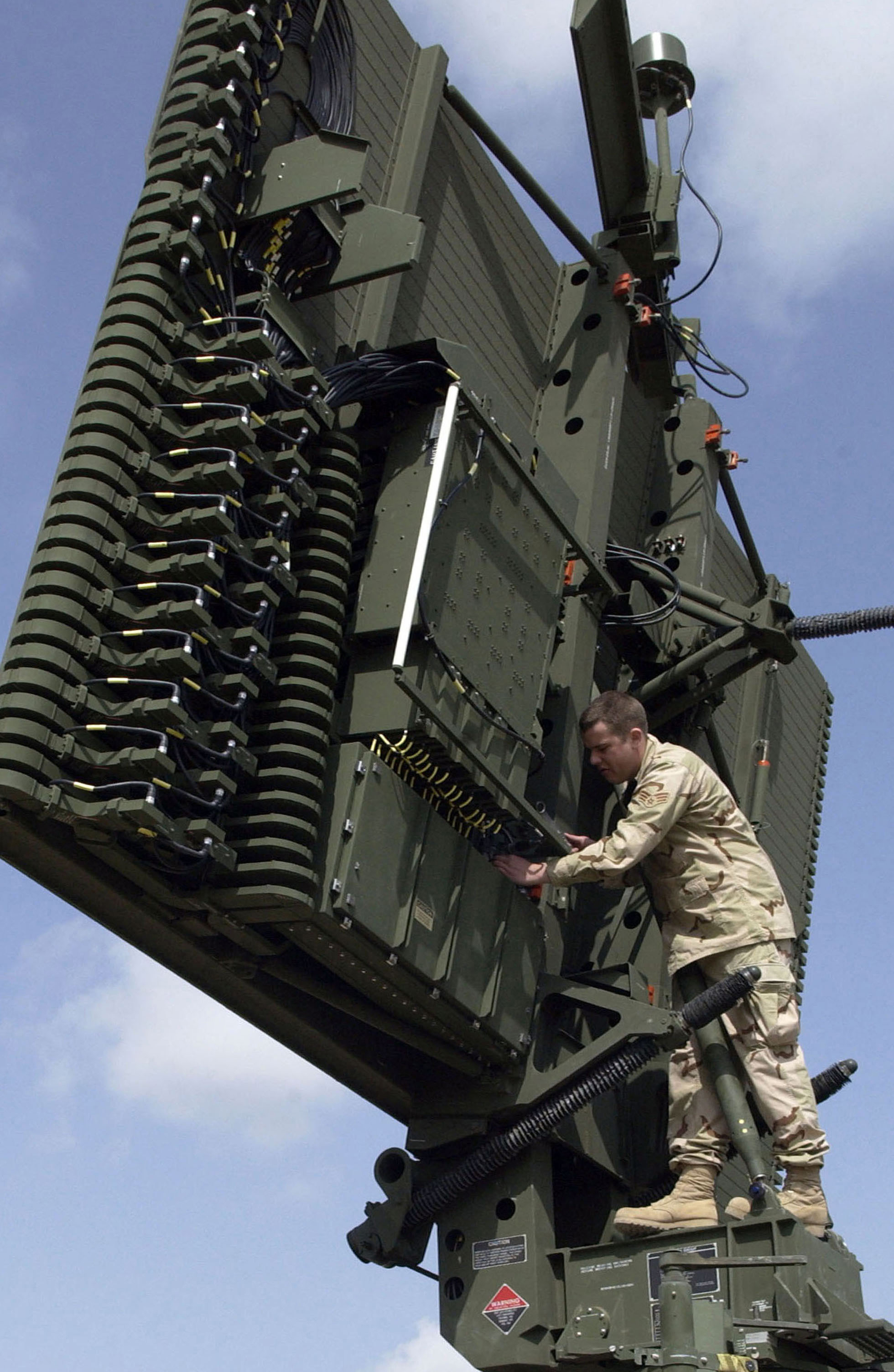
AN TPS-75 radar system being serviced

The AN/TPS-75 is the primary transportable Aerospace Control And Warning (AC&W) radar used by the United States Air Force. The TPS-75 is capable of transmitting 5-Megawatts of power. (Although 5-Megawatts is almost never achieved; realistically it is approx 2.8 Megawatts)

In accordance with the Joint Electronics Type Designation System (JETDS), the "AN/TPS-75" designation represents the 75th design of an Army-Navy electronic device for ground transportable search radar system. The JETDS system also now is used to name all Department of Defense electronic systems.

This radar was developed as an upgrade of the AN/TPS-43(V), which entered US service in 1970; it incorporates new electronics and a new Ultra Low Side Lobe Antenna (ULSA). About 67 TPS-43(V) radars were upgraded to TPS-75(V) standard starting in FY88.

The entire system can be broken down and packed onto two M939 trucks for road transport and mobile air transport by planes such as the C-130 Hercules or bigger. The entire radar system can be "torn down" and be ready for transport in just a few hours. This varies greatly with the number of personnel, their level of training, and method of transport. A typical convoy package would consist of one 5-ton truck pulling the radar van with the radar antenna in the bed of the truck and a support 5-ton pulling an AN/MJQ-1632 400 Hz power plant. The support truck would hold some spare parts, fuel tank(s), camouflage netting, and other logistical items as needed. The heat exchanger and -18 environmental control unit (ECU) are normally loaded into and transported within the radar van.

There are many add-ons for the TPS-75, one of which allows the AN/TPS-75 to be tilted back to see into the atmosphere assisting in detection of long range ballistic missiles.

== See also ==
- List of radars
- Ground Master 400
- KALKAN radar
- List of military electronics of the United States
- List of equipment of the Republic of China Air Force
