= Micropup =

In electronics, a micropup is a style of triode vacuum tube (valve) developed by the British General Electric Company (GEC) during World War II for use at very high frequencies such as those used in radar. The first micropup, the VT90, was introduced in 1939 and capable of operating at wavelengths as low as 25 cm, although at low power. The VT90 was much more widely used in a broad variety of radars operating in the 1.5 m band, around 200 MHz, which remained in widespread use for the rest of the war. Improved versions like the NT99 of 1941 allowed operations at 50 cm, or 600 MHz, leading to a series of new radar sets. These saw less use as the introduction of production-quality cavity magnetrons the same year led to microwave-frequency radars that outperformed the best micropups.

== Description ==
Key to the micropup design is the development of methods to seal glass directly to metal, allowing the construction of mixed-material vacuum chambers. Previously, tubes were all-glass and the need to limit heating of the glass led to very large designs known as doorknobs or acorns which spread out the heat. In the micropup, glass portions maintained the vacuum in the low-heat sections of the tube, and the active area, in the middle, was made of copper with metal fins that were brazed to the outside of the cylinder to improve heat dissipation, resulting in a design that looks somewhat like the cylinders in an air-cooled aviation engine. The much greater heat handling allowed the tubes to operate at much higher power levels.

The active section of the tube was similar to other designs of the era. The grid was a wire mesh cylinder, known alternatively as a "squirrel cage" or "parrot cage", was positioned just inside the anode and supported by a metal rod running out one end of the tube and held in position by one of the two glass tubes. The rod ran out through the end of glass enclosure and acted as the grid electrode connection. The cathode was supported by a glass disk inside the anode, with wires running the opposite direction and out through the second glass tube. A second wire on this end connected to the cathode heater. The anode, which was exposed outside of the tube, was connected to directly.

There is a dependence between the physical size of the tube that puts a limit on the minimum time it takes for the electrons to travel from the cathode to the anode, and this results in a maximum frequency that the tube can operate at. The micropup's large physical dimensions would normally result in a low-frequency tube, but this was overcome by operating at very high voltages to speed up the motion of the electrons.

The first models, the VT90s, could be operated at very short wavelengths (for the era), as low as 25 cm, or 1,200 MHz, but only at very low power levels of a few hundred watts per pulse. At 50 cm, 600 MHz, this was improved to the kilowatt range, and at 1.5 m, 200 MHz they reached 10 kW. As power level is more important for basic radar applications, the 1.5 m band became widely used in early-war British sets, including their Airborne Interception radars, Air-Sea Vessel radars Chain Home Low and AMES Type 7 anti-aircraft radars, and several Royal Navy sets. A 50 cm radar set using micropup was used by HMS Suffolk to track movements of the Bismarck.

GEC continued improving the design, with the next major version being the NT99 (known to the military as the CV92) which appeared in mid-1941. This greatly reduced the length of the glass tube and metal post holding the grid, resulting in a stronger design, allowing it to use a larger cathode and to place the components closer together. This allowed the operating frequencies to be increased, and could operate at the same power levels as the VT90 at 600 MHz, leading to a series of radars operating at this frequency. The NT99 also introduced a new oxide coated cathode which greatly improved the electron emission and led to higher efficiency overall. RCA made a version known as the 4C28 that they used in the SHORAN system.

Although widely used in "metre-band" radar systems, the cavity magnetron was able to produce significant power at much higher frequencies, as radar systems developed during the war.
