= IFF Mark III =

Aircraft identification friend or foe system

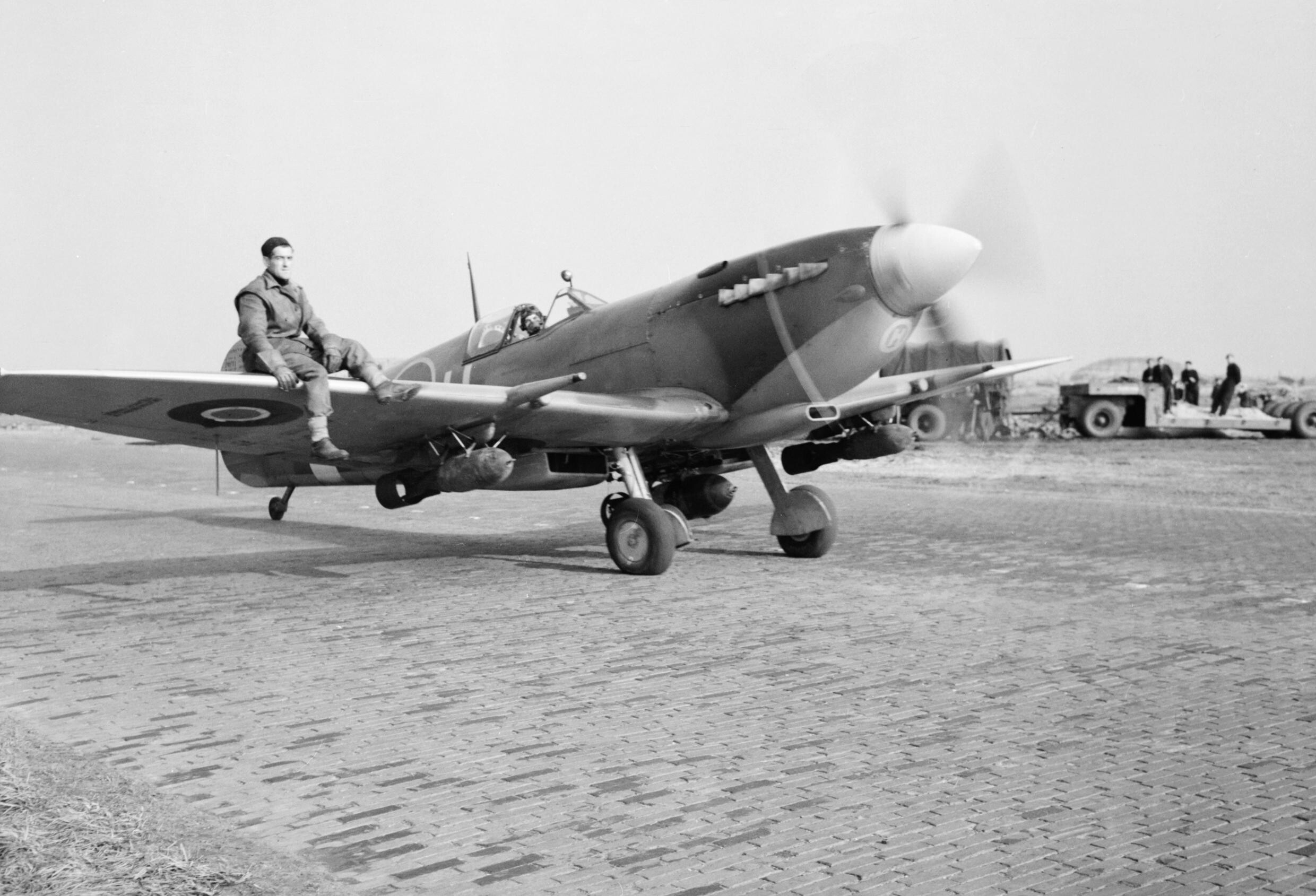
The IFF Mark III antenna can be seen extending downward on the bottom of the wing of this Spitfire Mk IXE just to the left of the crewman sitting on top. The vertical orientation of the Mark III antenna made it omnidirectional, a great advance over previous versions that used horizontal antennas.

IFF Mark III, also known as ARI.5025 in the UK or SCR.595 in the US, was the Allied Forces standard identification friend or foe (IFF) system from 1943 until well after the end of World War II. It was widely used by aircraft, ships, and submarines, as well as in various adaptations for secondary purposes like search and rescue. 500 units were also supplied to the Soviet Union during the war.

Mark III replaced the earlier Mark II which had been in service since 1940. Mark II had an antenna that received signals from radar systems, amplified them, and returned them. This caused the blip on the radar display to become larger, indicating a friendly aircraft. As the number of radar systems on different frequencies proliferated through the mid-war period, the number of models of Mark II had to do the same. Aircraft could never be sure their IFF would respond to the radars they flew over.

Freddie Williams had suggested using a single separate frequency for IFF as early as 1940, but at that time the problem had not become acute. The introduction of microwave radars based on the cavity magnetron was the main reason for adopting this solution, as the Mark II could not easily be adapted to respond on these frequencies. In 1942, a new frequency band, between 157 and 187 MHz, just below most VHF radars, was selected for this role. The only downside to this design is that the radar itself no longer provided the trigger signal for the transponder, so a separate transmitter and receiver was needed at the radar stations.

The Mark III began to replace the Mark II in 1942 and 1943, in a somewhat lengthy switchover period. It was also used as the basis for several other transponder systems such as Walter and Rebecca/Eureka, which allowed suitably equipped aircraft to home in on locations on the ground. These found use for dropping paratroopers and supplies in Europe, locating downed aircraft, and other roles. Several newer IFF designs were trialled, but none of them offered enough of an advantage to warrant a switchover. Mark III was replaced by IFF Mark X over an extended time starting in 1952.

== History ==
=== IFF Mark I and II ===
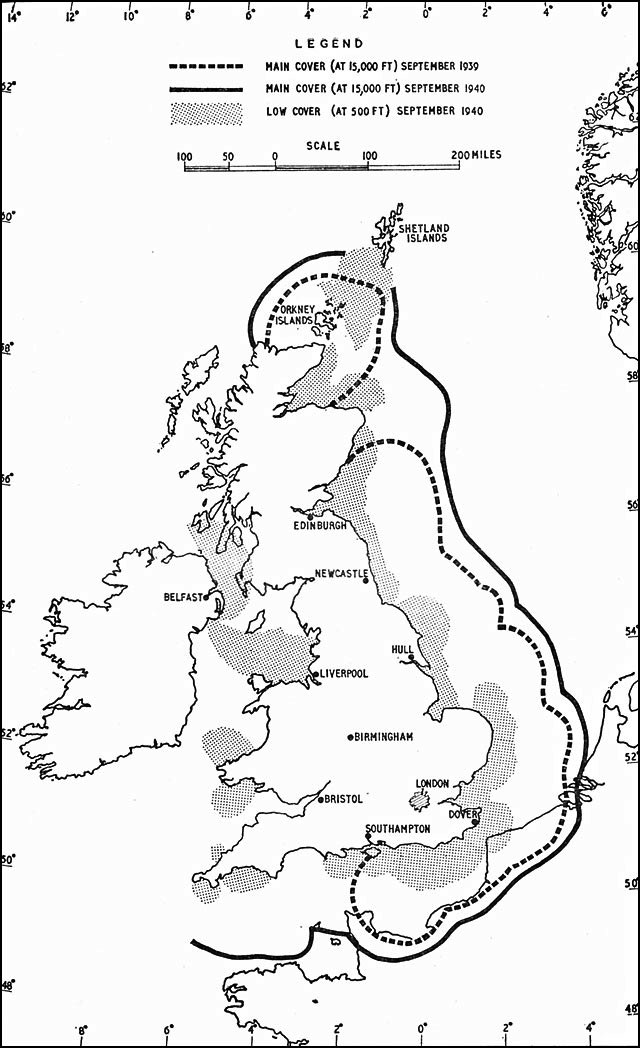
Map of the Chain Home system in 1939

IFF Mark I was the first IFF system to see experimental use, with a small number of units installed in 1939. Mark I was a simple system that listened for signals on the 5 meter band used by Chain Home radars and responded by sending out a short pulse on the same frequency. At the Chain Home station, this signal would be received slightly after the reflection of the station's own broadcast signal, and was more powerful. The result was that the aircraft's blip on the radar display grew larger and stretched out. The same blip would be produced if the radar was tracking a group of targets in formation, so the transponder also had a motorized switch that turned the signal on and off, causing the blip to oscillate on the display. Mark I was used only experimentally, with about 50 sets completed in total.

The problem with Mark I was that it operated only on the 23 MHz Chain Home frequency. By 1939 there were already several other radars being introduced that operated on different frequencies, notably the 75 MHz used by the GL Mk. I radar and the 43 MHz used by the Royal Navy's Type 79 radar. To address this, development of the IFF Mark II began in October 1939 and the first units were available in early 1940. This used a complex mechanical system to select among several separate radio tuners and sweep through each one's band of frequencies, ensuring it would hear the radar signal from any of the systems in service at some point in the 10 second cycle. Mark II was the first system to be operationally deployed, and was widespread by late 1940.

Even as Mark II was being deployed, it was clear that the number of radars being introduced would shortly present a problem even for that system. In 1940 Freddie Williams had suggested that the IFF systems should work on their own frequency band instead of trying to listen for every possible radar that might come along. This would also have the advantage that the radio electronics would be much simpler, eliminating the complex mechanical switch and multiple tuners. At the time it was not considered a serious enough problem to warrant a change, instead the Mark II's would be given different tuners depending on which radars they were expected to encounter. It was not long before there was a profusion of different versions of the Mark II covering different combinations of radars.

=== IFF Mark III ===
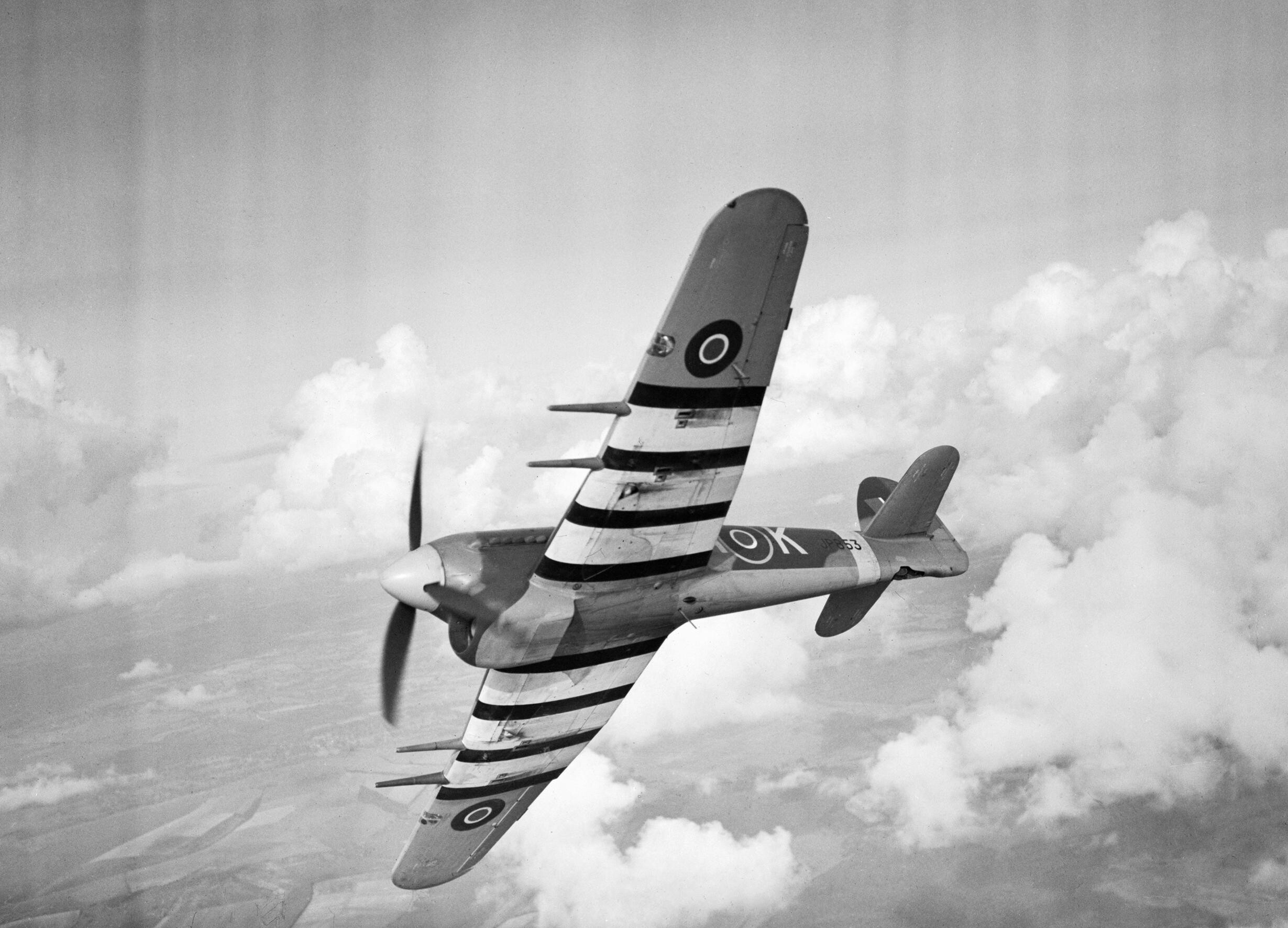
The IFF antenna is visible extending down under the cockpit of this Hawker Typhoon.

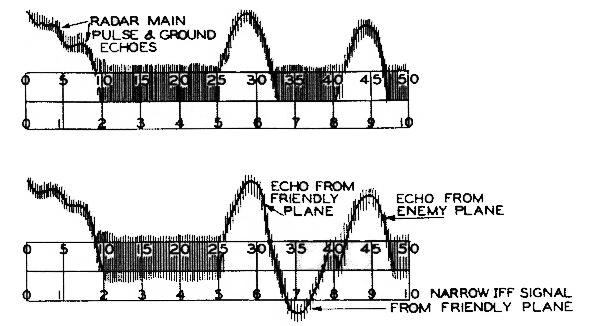
This image shows the effect of turning on IFF Mark III on a SCR-602 radar. The upper image shows the signal as it would be received without IFF, and the lower shows the negative blip that the IFF signals cause.

After the 1941 introduction of the cavity magnetron operating in the 3 GHz range this process could not be continued. These frequencies required entirely different electronics to detect and amplify. It was at this point that Williams's suggestion was first taken seriously. During the development of the new Mark III in 1941, Vivian Bowden was in charge. Converting the Mark II to this new concept was straightforward; they simply removed all of the existing tuner equipment and replaced it with a much simpler one tuned to a single band. The chosen band was 157 to 187 MHz, which the motorized tuner swept through every two seconds.

Things were not so simple on the radar station's side. Since the radar signal itself was no longer the trigger for the IFF transceiver, a new transmitter had to be added, known in British terminology as an interrogator. To ensure the signals remained in synchronicity with the radar, the interrogator had a trigger input that was fed a small amount of the radar signal so that the ground station sent out its interrogation pulse at the same time as the main radar signal. The aircraft's transponder received and rebroadcast the interrogation pulse. This signal was received by the respondor at the radar station. The second transmitter and receiver quickly gave rise to the name "secondary radar", which remains in use to this day.

This change also realized two additional advantages. Radar signals were typically horizontally polarized which improved the interaction with the ground or sea surface. This also meant the antenna on the aircraft should ideally be horizontal as well. This was not easy to arrange, on the Supermarine Spitfire, for instance, the antenna was stretched along the fuselage toward the tail, and only operated properly if the aircraft was flying roughly perpendicular to the radar so the antenna was visible. With the move to a separate transmitter, the signal could be vertically polarized instead. Mark III antennas were a simple quarter-wave unipole projecting down from the bottom of the aircraft, which provided excellent omnidirectional reception as long as the aircraft was not upside down.

The other advantage was that the return pulse no longer had to be short or singular. With Mark II the IFF signals were displayed on the same display as the radar signals, so if the IFF returned too many of these signals or ones that were too long, they could hide the blips from other aircraft on the display. With Mark III, the signal was separately received and did not have to be sent to the same display. Generally, the signal was sent through an inverter and then sent to a second channel on the radar's cathode ray tube. The result was a normal radar display on top (or bottom) half of the screen, and a second similar display below it (or above) with the IFF signals only. This allowed the Mark III to send back longer pulses as they no longer overlapped aircraft reflections which were above the axis. This made the signals both easier to see as well as allowing them to be modified in order to identify individual aircraft or provide security.

Another problem that had been seen in Mark II as the number of radar sets in use increased was that the number of interrogation signals being received began to swamp the transponder's ability to reply. A related issue made tracking distant targets difficult; in the case where two aircraft were being interrogated by a single radar, their responses would not overlap because the more distant aircraft was not triggered until the signal reached it at a later time. However, if the nearer aircraft was being interrogated by more than one radar, its responses to those other radars might occur at the same time as the other aircraft's response to the first, masking it. Mark III fixed both of these problems. The first was addressed by adding a delay so the transponder responded only after receiving 4, 5 or 6 pulses. The second was somewhat more complex; as the interrogation rate increased, the Mark III began to lower its output signal, so that more distant aircraft signals were not masked.

The new design also included a number of detail improvements, most notably a new power supply for the transponder. This allowed the crews to adjust the strength of the return signal while the aircraft was on the ground (or on the deck of an aircraft carrier) and no adjustments were needed in flight. This greatly improved the reliability of the system.

=== In service ===
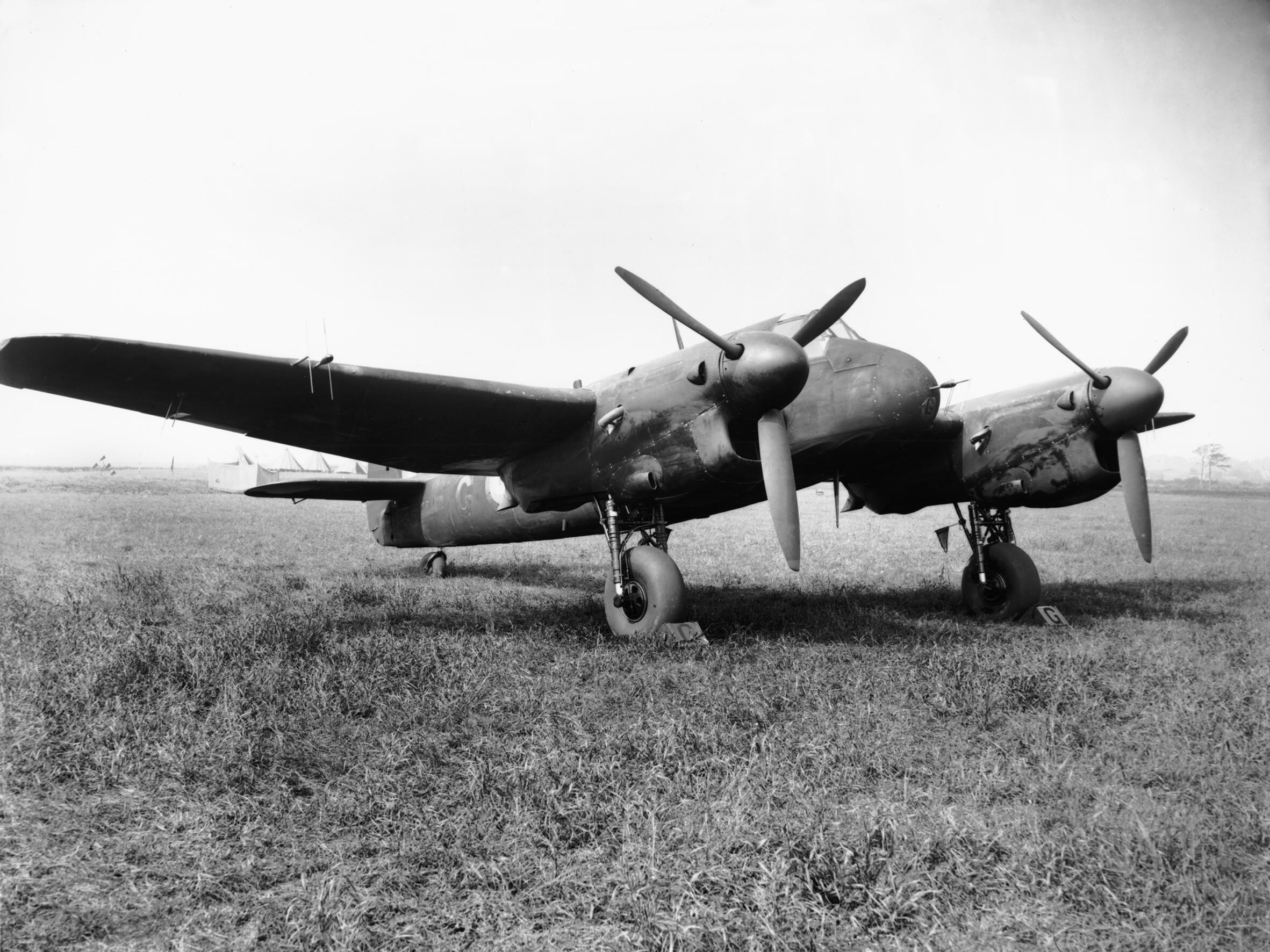
Bristol Beaufighter NF Mk II

Shortly after Bowden took over the development of the Mark III, he was summoned by the Commander in Chief, Fighter Command, Hugh Dowding. Dowding stated

Well, last Saturday night, a Stirling bomber came back from a raid on the Ruhr. It got lost, and it was assumed to be hostile. Two Beaufighters went to intercept it. One of them shot it down, and then it was itself shot down by the other Beaufighter. Two aircraft and a dozen lives lost! What are you going to do about it?

They responded by working night and day until the system was completed, which was "introduced quickly" and went into production at Ferranti in Manchester. A big trial was carried out in Pembrokeshire with transponders installed in all sorts of aircraft. This successful demonstration was one of the reasons the US Army Air Force selected Mark III for their own aircraft, instead of their own designs that were somewhat more sophisticated. This led to a massive production effort in the US, where Bowden was sent to help get things started. At one point, Hazeltine Corporation was building more IFF units than all other radars in the US combined.

IFF only works if the aircraft being queried is carrying it; this makes the switchover from one IFF to another a difficult affair as it has to be carried out all-or-nothing in any given area of operations. This was almost impossible to arrange and led to great confusion. For instance, during the Operation Avalanche period in September 1943, the anti-aircraft cruiser HMS Delhi reported that over a period of a month they interrogated Mark I, Mark II, Mark IIG, Mark IIN and Mark III, as well as many friendly aircraft that displayed no IFF at all. Mark III was still considered a qualified success during this era.

One of the few modifications to the basic Mark III was the Mark IIIG, also known as ARI.5131 in the UK or SCR-695 in the US. This combined the normal Mark III transponder with a second one tuned to the frequency of the newer ground control radars, notably the AMES Type 7 at 209 MHz. A motorized switch was used to turn on the second frequency for 1/5 of a second, once every second. This produced a signal similar to the one from the original Mark I but because Type 7 used a plan-position indicator display, the result was a series of small blips on either side of the target return. This was known as the "crown of thorns". A further version, Mark IIIQ or ARI.5640, does not appear to have been deployed.

=== Beacon use ===
James Rennie Whitehead used the Mark III electronics to produce beacons that responded on the 176 MHz frequency of ASV Mk. II radar. These were placed at naval bases and Fleet Air Arm airfields, allowing aircraft to use their anti-shipping radars as long-range navigation systems. As they only responded to a single frequency, they were more like the original Mark I in a technical sense, but used the Mark III internals to gain all the advantages of the newer electronics and production capability. When the Blind Approach Beacon System (BABS) was introduced on 173.5 MHz, the ASV beacons had to move to 177 MHz. A similar system for RAF airfields was quickly adopted by the night fighters, operating on the 212 MHz of the AI Mark IV they carried.

To use the system, the aircraft would first fly in the rough direction of the airfield so their radar signals would hit the transponder. The transponder would then reply to the pulses of the fighter's radar, providing a powerful signal that could be received at ranges as great as 100 miles (160 km). The signal was received by two antennas that were aimed slightly left or right of the direction of travel, and by comparing the length of the resulting blips on the radar display, the operator could tell the pilot which direction to turn to point the nose directly at it.

In June 1941, a battery-powered version of the same equipment was used by Robert Hanbury Brown in a demonstration for the RAF Army Co-Operation Command. He told them to hide the transponder anywhere within 15 miles (24 km) of their HQ in Bracknell. Not only did their RAF Bristol Blenheim easily find it, but it also attracted the attention of a night fighter that just happened to be flying in the area and saw an odd return on their display. When the Co-Operation Command observers complained that it was a setup, their Blenheim repeated the trick a second time after the transponder was moved.

Further development of this basic concept led to the Rebecca/Eureka transponding radar system. The only major change to the original beacon concept was to respond on a second frequency, to avoid the noise created by the original radar signal reflecting off the ground. This required a similar change in the radar to receive this second frequency. The transponders, known as Eureka, were dropped to resistance groups in occupied Europe, allowing them to accurately guide Rebecca-equipped aircraft dropping supplies and agents. Since the system did not broadcast any signals until the aircraft switched on its radar, and then only for a few minutes during the drop, they were very secure as German radio operators did not have much time to use a radio direction finder on the signals.

A similar system was introduced in 1943 as "Walter". This was a small version of the beacon system that was carried aboard aircraft life rafts and activated if they were forced down on water. This allowed search and rescue aircraft to home in on the downed aircraft from very long range. In practice these proved useful but variable; the system had to be small and lightweight which made its performance less than ideal.

Around the same time, the ground-based homing beacons were placed in Coastal Command aircraft operating in the Mediterranean area. These installations were known as "Rooster". Aircraft flying patrols would not attack targets directly, but instead turn on its Rooster and follow the target. This made a blip appear on all of the other aircraft's ASV Mark II radar displays which they would then use to find the indicated area. These IIF Mark IIIG(R) (for Rooster) allowed the aircraft to converge en masse.

=== IFF Mark IV and V ===
Although very successful, Mark III had problems of its own. Primary among them was that it would respond to any signal across a wide variety of frequencies around 180 MHz. An enemy who knew this could send out random signals on this band and receive signals about the position of any aircraft carrying a Mark III transponder. A less important problem was that as electronics improved it became possible to move to higher frequencies in the UHF region, which allowed for smaller antennas and thus less drag on the aircraft.

The US Naval Research Laboratory (NRL) had already been working on IFF-like devices before being introduced to the Mark II. Their system used separate frequencies of 470 MHz from the ground station and 493.5 MHz for the reply from the aircraft. This separation of frequencies meant that separate transmitters and receivers had to be used, making the sets more complex but had the significant advantage that a response from one aircraft could not trigger IFF units in nearby aircraft.

As the Mark II and Mark III went into service, the NRL design was given the name Mark IV. The selected frequency happened to be close to the frequencies used by the German Würzburg radar. There were concerns that a Würzburg might trigger the Mark IV and cause a reply on their display, immediately revealing the presence of the system and its working frequencies. For this reason, the Mark IV was held in reserve in case Mark III was compromised. This did occur very late in the war but too late to be a concern. Some Mk. IVs were used in the Pacific Theatre in WWII but it was never used in Europe.

Bowden stayed on in the US, joining the NRL group in 1942 to begin development of the further improved Mark V, later known as the United Nations Beacon or UNB. This moved to even higher frequencies between 950 and 1150 MHz, dividing up this band into twelve discrete "channels". This allowed the ground operators to instruct the aircraft to change their transponder to a specific channel so that they could be sure they were receiving the signals from their interrogator and not an enemy broadcaster. The system also included many more variations on the return signal, which allowed ground operators to set a day code and then ignore signals that didn't respond with the proper code.

At that time, Controller of Research and Development of the Navy was Admiral Ernest King, who put the highest possible national priority on the development of UNB. To house the development team, a new 60,000 square feet (5,600 m^{2}) building was constructed by a huge work gang working 24 hours. In contrast to the development of Mark III, which had a team of a few dozen, UNB's team was over ten times that. The first systems were available in August 1944 but the end of the war in 1945 ended major effort. Testing continued and was completed in 1948.

=== Replacement by Mark X ===
Mark III was finally replaced in the early 1950s by the IFF Mark X. This moved to even higher frequencies, 1030 MHz for interrogation and 1090 MHz for replies. Using separate frequencies helped reduce crosstalk between the electronics. Later versions included the "Selective Identification Feature" (or "Facility"), or SIF for short. This introduced the ability to respond only to a certain pattern of pulses from the interrogator, and respond with a similarly custom set of pulses. This made it very difficult for an enemy to trigger the IFF without knowing the proper code.

The fact that the Soviet Union had been supplied with 500 Mark III units was a serious concern for US Navy planners. It was assumed that the Soviets would use these units during the Korean War, and this caused the concern that an aircraft carrier might find itself being attacked by a group of planes displaying proper IFF responses. In May 1951, the US Far East Air Force ordered its units to not assume an aircraft displaying Mark III was friendly.

By this time the US had already begun switching over to Mark X although this caused just as much confusion as the switch to Mark III. The British and Commonwealth ships had not yet begun this conversion. The result was a friendly fire incident on 23 June 1950 when HMS Hart opened fire on two P-51 Mustangs when bombs were dropped nearby. In July 1951, Scott-Moncrieff stated that "identification has been one of the more unsatisfactory features of this war" and in August the decision was made to treat all aircraft as friendly to avoid friendly-fire incidents.
