= AN/TPS-1 =

US ground-based radar introduced in WW2

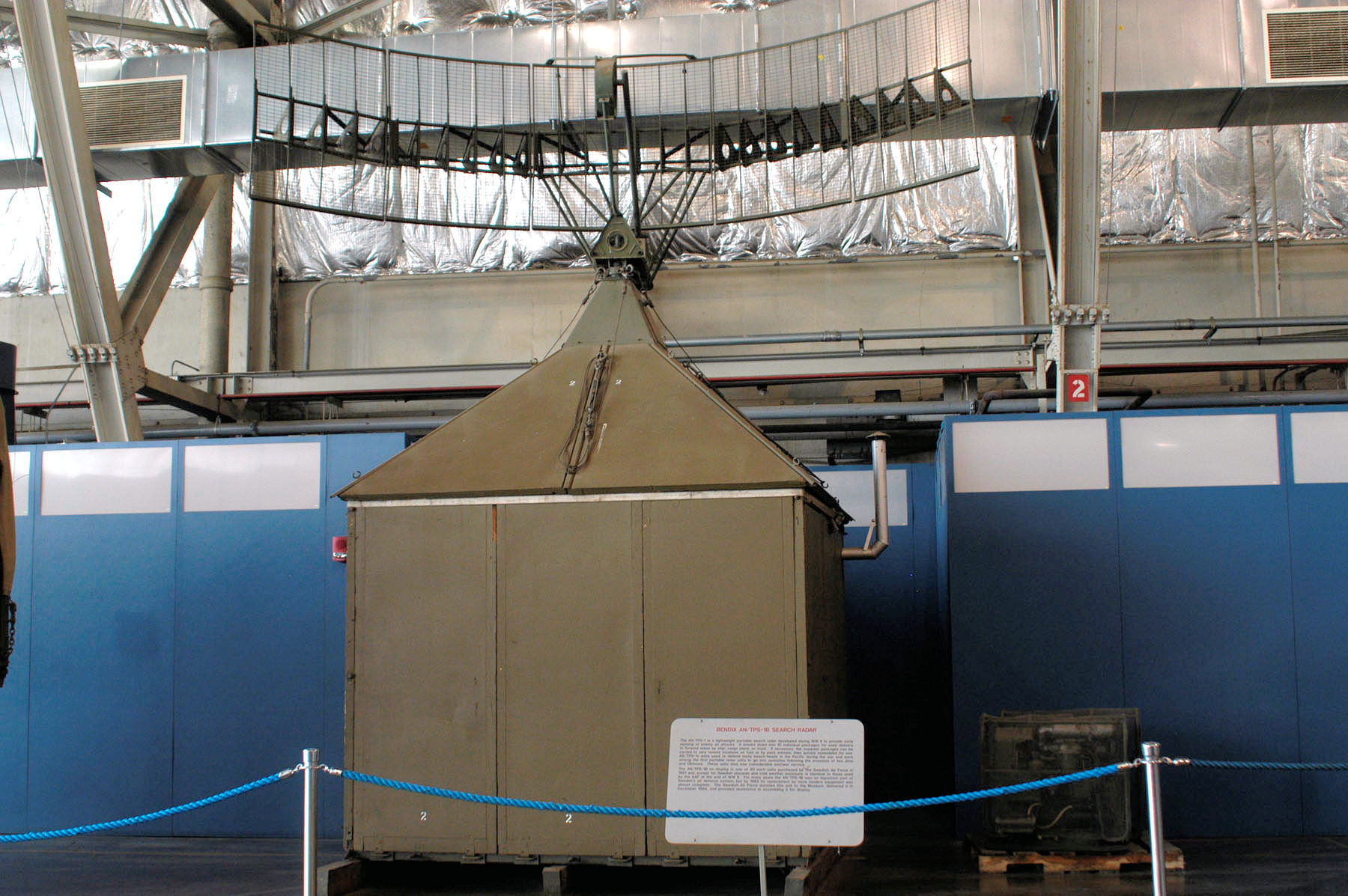
- AN/TPS-1B at the National Museum of the United States Air Force
- Country of origin: United States
- Introduced: 1944
- Type: Portable Long Range Search Radar
- Frequency: L-band, 1220 to 1350 MHz
- PRF: 4 usec
- Beamwidth: 3.7 ° (horizontal)
- Range: 28, 80 or 200 miles (45, 129, or 322 km)
- Azimuth: 360º
- Precision: +/- 1 mile + 3% range.
- Other names: SCR-603, AMES Type 61

The AN/TPS-1, earlier known as SCR-603, was an early warning and tactical control radar developed by Bell Labs and the MIT Radiation Laboratory during World War II. Initially used by the US Army, it was later used by the United States Air Force Air Defense Command, and a number of European armed forces. A number of variations were produced by several vendors, including Western Electric, Westinghouse Electric, Bendix Corporation and several European manufacturers in the post-war era. In Royal Air Force service it was known as AMES Type 61.

In accordance with the Joint Electronics Type Designation System (JETDS), the "AN/TPS-1" designation represents the first design of an Army-Navy electronic device for ground transportable search radar system. The JETDS system also now is used to name all Department of Defense electronic systems.

The TPS-1 is a lightweight portable search radar using a cut-down parabolic antenna of the "orange peel" design with an off-axis feed and transmitting in the L-band between 1220 and 1280 megahertz (MHz). The initial versions were designed to break down into ten packages and then be assembled on-site, but a number of adaptations to large trucks and even school bus frames were made over the years. A crew of two could operate the radar. The 1B model could detect bombers at 10,000 feet at a distance of 120 nautical miles. Versions B through G differed primarily in the antenna pattern, providing better vertical range, but were electrically identical.

TPS-1s were used to defend many beach-heads in the Pacific during the war and were among the first portable radar units to go into operation following the invasions of Iwo Jima and Okinawa. These units saw considerable postwar service. It was used in the temporary Lashup Radar Network beginning in 1948. The AN/TPS-1D was the main component of the AN/GSS-1 Electronic Search Central system used with Nike missile systems.

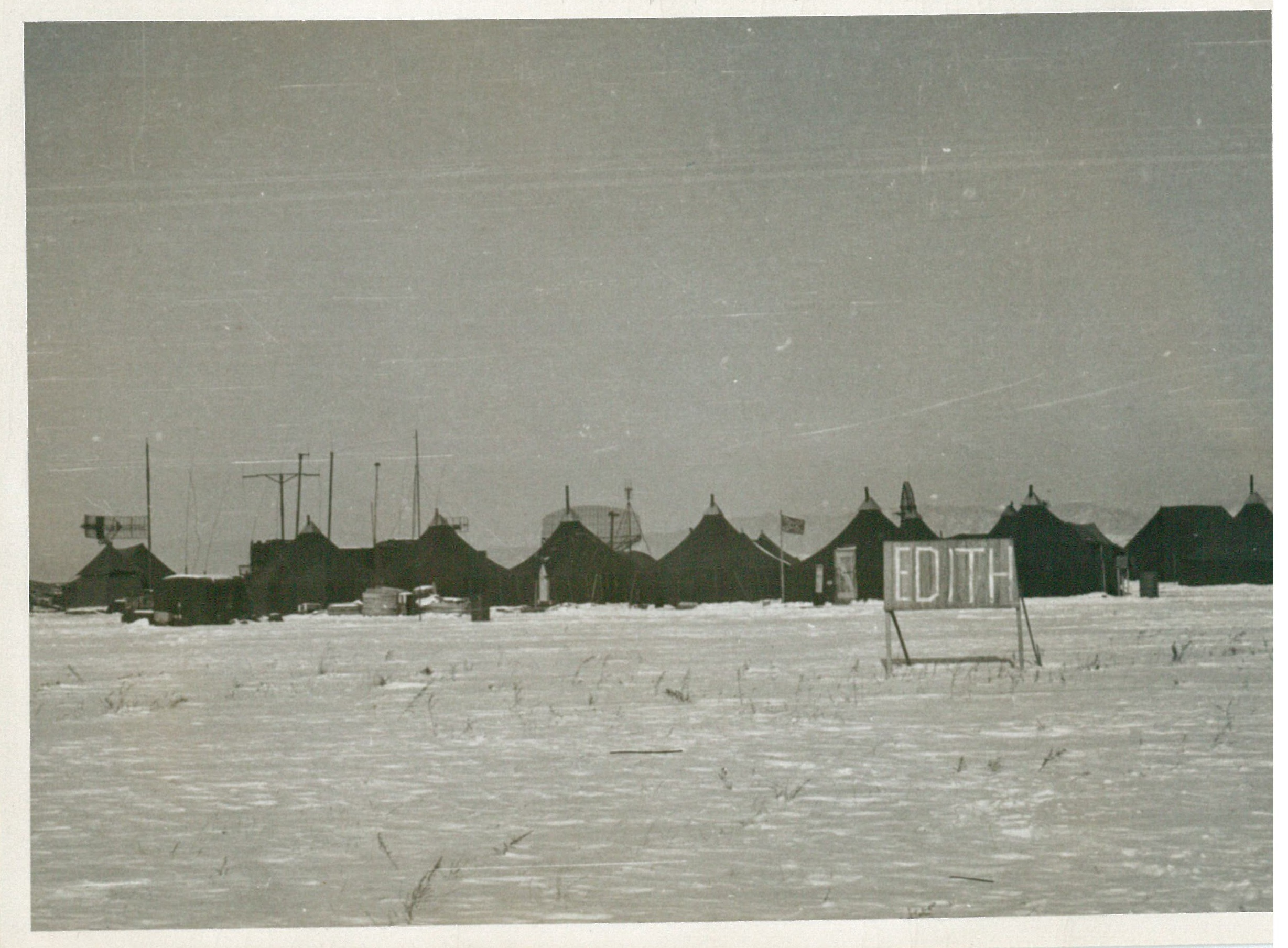
MGCIS-1 radar site at Yonpo Airfield, Korea in December 1950. The TPS-1B is on the far left of the photo

== See also ==
- List of radars
- Target allocation radar TPS-1E
- List of AN/TPS- radar systems
- List of military electronics of the United States
