= SW1C =

Canadian WWII-era radar system

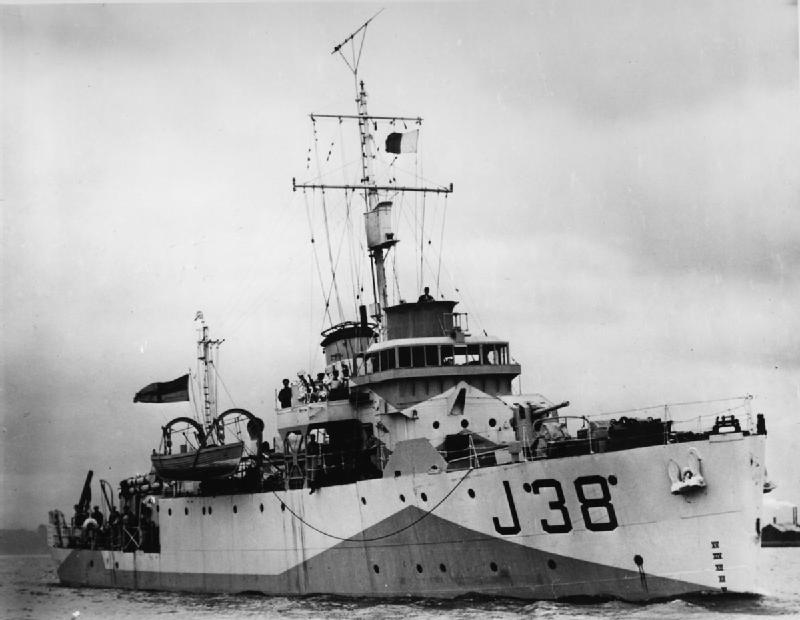
- SW1C at the top of HMCS Caraquet's mast
- Country of origin: Canada
- Introduced: 1941
- No. built: hundreds
- Type: surface search/anti-submarine
- Frequency: VHF, 200 or 215 MHz
- RPM: manual
- Other names: CSC, SW2C, SW3C, SW2C/P, SW3C/P

SW1C, short for Surface Warning, Model 1, Canadian, was an early radar system developed by the National Research Council of Canada (NRC) for the Royal Canadian Navy (RCN).

Originally known as CSC, for Canadian Submarine Control, it was developed in less than two months by combining bits of the British ASV Mk. II radar and the NRC's own Night Watchman. After successful demonstrations in May 1941, the system was ordered into production and several hundred examples were produced by Research Enterprises Limited in Toronto. Two upgrades were made over the year-long production run, the SW2C which moved to a slightly higher frequency, and the SW3C which used a motorized antenna and PPI display.

In service, they proved unreliable with marginal detection capability and a significant maintenance load. They also lost effectiveness in late 1942 as the German U-boat fleet deployed the Metox radar detector that could detect the SW long before the radar could see the submarine. They were replaced in the anti-submarine role by the British Type 271 radar starting in 1943, as rapidly as deliveries allowed. SW remained in service as a backup system and for aircraft detection.

== History ==
=== Early developments ===
In early 1939, the British government invited teams from Canada, Australia, New Zealand and South Africa to visit the UK to be briefed on the then highly secret developments in radar. By September, with the opening of World War II, the Radio Branch of the National Research Council of Canada (NRC) begun low-level studies of the concept using the electronics from a US built radio altimeter system. They also began liaising with the various military branches on potential applications. Shortly thereafter, the Royal Canadian Navy (RCN) asked the NRC to provide a better way to look for submarines sneaking into Halifax Harbour. The NRC quickly produced a system known as Night Watchman working on the 1.5 m (200 MHz) band. This went into service in July 1940, becoming the first operational radar in North America.

In October 1940, while en route to Washington, DC, members of the Tizard Mission stopped in Ottawa to provide them with updates on their progress in the UK. Among the various items being discussed, the team sent a functional ASV Mark II radar to the NRC team. (Note: The ASV Mark I was intended to be shipped with the team, but due to a decision in the UK, the later Mark II unit was sent a short time later.) This system also operated on the 1.5 m (200 MHz) band, which was being used by a variety of British radars. After the Mission moved on to Washington, a Canadian contingent soon joined them, and the three countries began discussing priorities. It was agreed that Canada would put the ASV into production while the US concentrated on the more advanced microwave-frequency systems the Mission was demonstrating. The ASV's transmitter was adapted to operate using US and Canadian vacuum tubes in place of the Philips designs used in the British sets, and plans for large production runs for sale to the US Navy began at Research Enterprises Limited (REL) in Toronto.

=== CSC ===
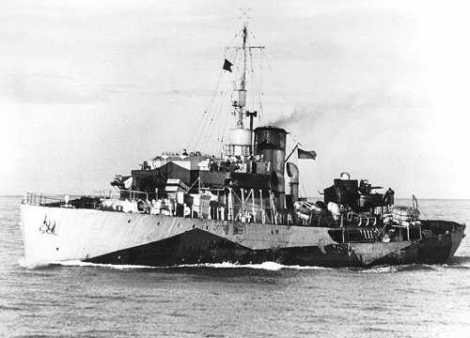
HMCS Chambly was the first ship to carry CSC. Here she is seen later in the war with the updated SW2C at the top of the mast and Type 271 (white cylinder) at the bottom.

In February 1941, the Navy asked the NRC about a radar system capable of detecting surfaced submarines. A follow-up meeting on 19 March concluded that while using the much shorter wavelengths from the cavity magnetron shown to them by the Mission would be preferable for many reasons, too much basic development was still needed before it could be used operationally. They agreed that an interim system based on the ASV radar would be useful in the meantime. Initially the idea was to use the ASV electronics as-is, but for reasons explained only as "to avoid the troubles of inter-connection cables", it was decided to modify it into a smaller form using a modified version of the ASV transmitter and the receiver from Night Watchman. The transmitter differed from the original ASV design primarily due to the unavailability of the VT90 micropup tubes, which were made in the UK.

The resulting system, known as CSC, was developed and installed in a remarkably short 54 days, beginning sea trials aboard HMCS Chambly on 12 May 1941. The next day the sea was completely covered in fog, reducing visibility to 0.25 miles (400 m). A Dutch submarine visiting Halifax for servicing, HNLMS O 15, agreed to act as a target. Starting together, the Chambly pulled away from the submarine and was able to continue detecting it to a range of 2.7 miles (4.3 km). Continuing for another mile, the Chambly turned around and began to approach again, picking it up at the same range. Based on manual plotting and dead reckoning, the ship's captain, Commander James D. Prentice, insisted it was 28 degrees to one side. They continued following the radar until the submarine became visible dead ahead, so accurately centred that they would have collided with it had they not stopped. The crew reported that the captain "was delighted with these results, and we repeated the tests for him a second and third time."

The results were so encouraging that there was an immediate demand for service sets as soon as possible. The RCN loaned the NRC fifteen sub-lieutenants who hand built seven more examples.

=== Into production ===
After the hand-built examples were completed, the NRC had produced enough documentation for REL to start production. At this time they were given the new name SW1C, using the "surface warning" terminology that had been introduced by Royal Navy for their earlier Type 279 radar. Supplies of the needed electronic parts were severely limited, and by the end of 1941 only fifteen corvettes and three merchantmen had been fitted. In service, problems became immediately apparent; the antenna system often produced false echos, sometimes on the opposite side of the ship, and the long pulse duration meant it could not see anything within half a mile.

Worse, while the system worked well in calm seas, in the mid-Atlantic swells it proved to be filled with noise from reflections of waves, making it difficult or impossible to see a U-boat if it was properly trimmed so only the conning tower was above water. In one case, Lieutenant-Commander Alan Stevens, anti-submarine control officer of HMCS Restigouche, noted that when they attempted to find the U-boat that had just sunk one of their ships, SW not only failed to find it, but also failed to notice the large iceberg near the ship.

After handing production off to REL, the NRC started an operator training program. Unfortunately, neither the Navy nor NRL set up a training program for maintenance crews, which led to very low serviceability in the field. This was further hindered by the RCN's habit of sending new recruits to serve in the labs and as operators, in contrast to the Royal Navy, which sent its most experienced men to these posts. This could not be corrected, as most of the experienced radio operators in Canada had been sent to England to help operate and maintain the Chain Home system and its follow-ons. The Navy was forced to take on Royal Canadian Air Force personnel to fix their systems.

These issues, combined with a number of poorly thought-out features, resulted in the system being considered a maintenance nuisance throughout its time in service. The rotation system, in particular, was notoriously unreliable; in one instance a naval rating was detailed to the roof to turn the antenna manually with a pipe wrench when the linkage failed while trying to navigate through a convoy. The Royal Navy attempted to help by taking over maintenance when Canadian ships arrived in Derry, but this was so time consuming the Admiralty suggested they simply be scrapped. The RCN refused this suggestion.

=== Upgrades ===
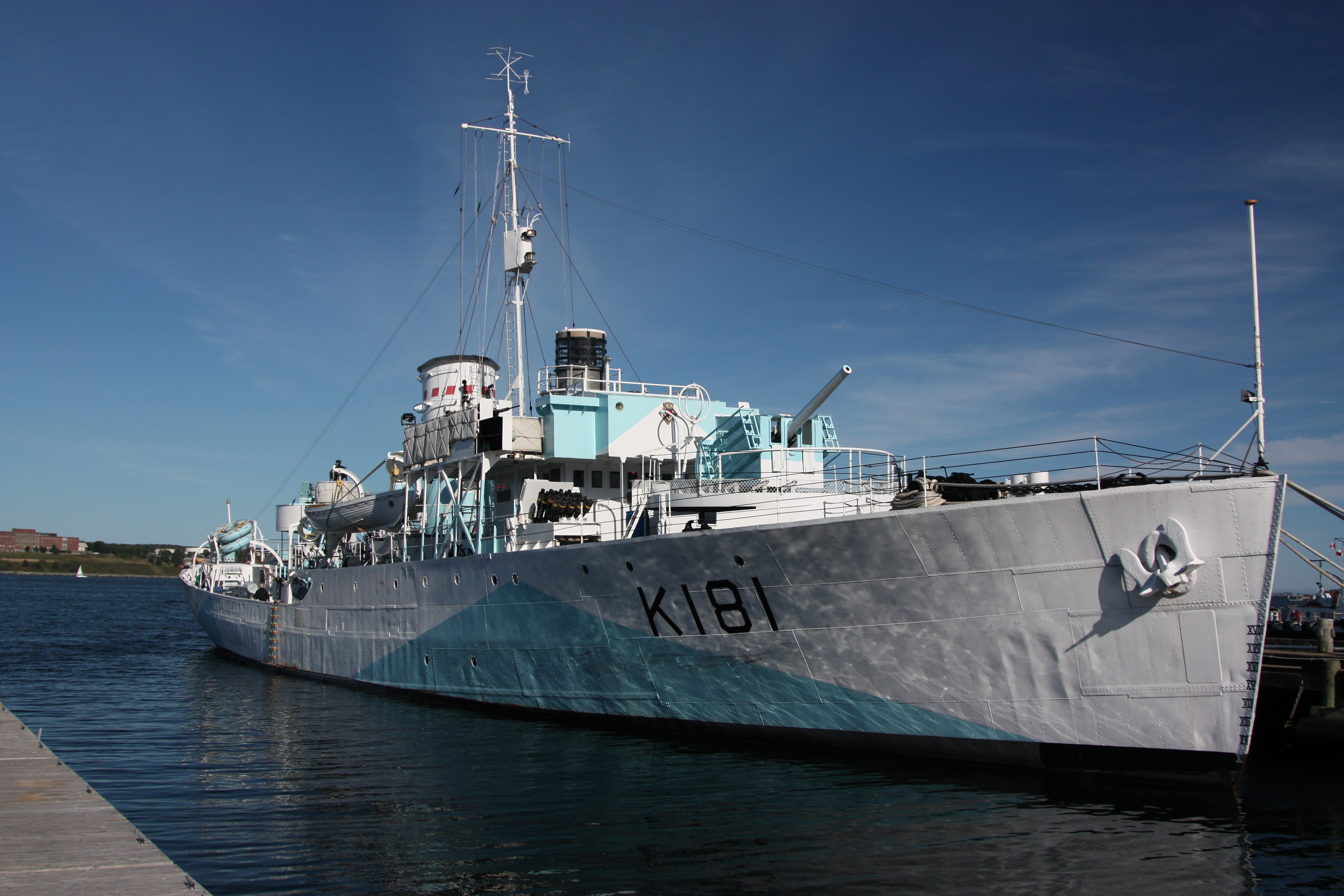
HMCS Sackville still carries the updated SW2C antenna.

Starting in September 1941, there were efforts to motorize the antenna display at the masthead to replace the unreliable mechanical linkage, but weight was a problem. This led to an improved antenna design which used four smaller Yagis instead of one large one. Around the same time, the system was modified to operate at the slightly higher frequency of 215 MHz instead of 200. This was the frequency used for many radio navigation aids and IFF Mark III systems. This meant that when the radar sent out radio signals, these transponders would reply and produce a strong image on the radar display, visually indicating that the return was from a friendly ship or aircraft. These improvements became the SW2C, which was fit to existing SW1C installations without the motorized system.

In December 1942, the Navy asked for a version able to be mounted on motor torpedo boats. The NRC dusted off their work with the motorized rotation using the new antenna, becoming SW3C. This also changed the display from a B-scope displaying angle and range, to a plan position indicator (PPI) that produced a 360-degree view around the ship. PPIs made guiding the ship toward a target much easier as the location of a blip on the display was a direct measure of the angle and range relative to the direction of motion.

=== Replacement ===
While SW1C was being developed, the only similar radar the RCN was aware of was the British Type 286 radar. This was a VHF set similar to the SW in overall terms, but used a fixed antenna that required the entire ship to turn for scanning. Despite the problems found in service, the SW was still considered superior to the Type 286.

Unknown to the RCN at the time, the UK had already developed a dramatically improved surface search radar, the microwave-frequency Type 271. The RCN did not learn of the 271 until the SW1C was entering production, by which time the NRC were in the midst of developing a similar microwave-frequency system, RX/C. RX/C ultimately failed and development was cancelled. The number of 271 units produced in the UK was so small there was simply no way the Canadian ships could be fit while the RN was upgrading their own fleet. This meant the SW continued in use through the early part of 1943, when US and RN ships had moved to better systems.

All of the SW's inherent problems were compounded by the introduction of the Metox radar detector on the U-boats in late 1942. This allowed the U-boats to detect radio signals in the 1.5 m band used by SW and other UK radars, warning them of any nearby radars long before that radar could detect the U-boat. Metox could not detect microwave-frequency radars like the 271, putting the Canadian ships at a significant disadvantage to their allies. Their poor performance was compounded by launching the boats directly from the dockyards into combat, providing almost no training time. Issues came to a head during a visit by British Prime Minister Winston Churchill in the spring of 1943, when he noted that not a single one of the 100 U-boats sunk in the North Atlantic from January to May could definitely be attributed to the Canadian ships, despite Canadian ships representing half of the escort fleet.

Supplies of the 271 finally improved by the late summer of 1943 as the Royal Navy's own fleet completed their upgrades. The Admiralty recalled all of the Canadian ships to UK docks and began fitting them with 271 and huff-duff, as well as giving the crews time to train on land while waiting for the refits to complete. The SW sets were not removed, but instead given a secondary role as a backup to the 271 and as an air-warning set that could be used to scan for aircraft while the 271 scanned the surface. Because the two operated on such different frequencies, both could be used at the same time.

== Description ==
Although the electronics for the SW series were mostly adapted from existing systems, the antenna was significantly different. It consisted of a long Yagi antenna with a cross-shaped reflector that had to be mounted at the top of the mast in order for it to be able to rotate. It was further supported by two long arms below the antenna, with the main support rod and two supports forming a large equilateral triangle. The antenna was swung manually to search for targets using a steering wheel from Chevrolet, which drove a chain connected to a long shaft running up the mast to the antenna. The antenna was large enough that it became a real problem to aim in high winds, especially when it was iced over.

The antenna was connected to the receiver using a long coaxial cable. This was prone to ingesting sea water, which made it lose so much signal as to be useless. This could be purged by injecting high-pressure nitrogen from a bottle, but the valve for releasing the gas into the cable was at the top of the mast and required the mast to be climbed to manually open the valve.

The electronics were packaged into two cabinets, one with the transmitter and the other with the power supplies, receiver and display. The receiver fed a B-scope display with the horizontal position indicating angle relative to the direction of the ship's motion, and vertical distance from the bottom indicating range to the target. The motorized versions presented a plan position indicator (PPI) display instead.
