= Night Watchman (radar) =

WWII-era radar in Halifax, Canada

- Country of origin: Canada
- Introduced: 1940
- No. built: 3
- Type: Coast watching
- Frequency: VHF
- Pulsewidth: 0.5 μs
- Range: 10,000 yd (9.1 km)
- Power: 1 kW
- Other Names: NW

Night Watchman (NW) was an early Canadian radar system used during World War II. It was installed in a fixed emplacement on the approaches to Halifax Harbour in Nova Scotia in July 1940, used to watch for ships or submarines attempting to enter the harbour area. It was the first radar of Canadian design, and the first radar of any sort to be used operationally in North America. A second unit was built for use in the United States, and a third as a backup for the first in Halifax.

== History ==
In early 1939, the British government invited teams from Canada, Australia, New Zealand, and South Africa to visit the United Kingdom to be briefed on the then highly secret developments in radar. By September, with the start of World War II and the entry of the United Kingdom and Canada into the war, the Radio Branch of the National Research Council of Canada (NRC) began low-level studies of the concept using the electronics from a U.S.-built radio altimeter system. They also began liaising with the various military branches on potential applications.

A serious concern was that enemy warships, especially U-boats, might enter Halifax Harbour at night. The entrance is wide enough to make visual spotting difficult, especially in foggy conditions. The initial solution was an anti-submarine indicator loop, an electrical cable in a loop across the harbour entrance. As a ship passed over the loop, its magnetic properties would change the current flowing in the cable, which could be detected using conventional meters. However, these readings were fleeting and noisy, making detection largely a matter of luck.

In March 1940, (Note: Merklinger states that development of NW began in September 1939, but all other sources, including the NRC's own reports, state it was 1940. It is likely Merklinger is referring to the earlier experiments.) the Royal Canadian Navy asked the NRC if they could develop a system that would supplant the cable detector. The NRC responded by adapting a 1 kW VHF transmitter with a matched receiver, with the broadcast and reception on two matching billboard antennas. The receiver, a superheterodyne, sent its output to a 5 inches (130 mm) cathode ray tube with the timing set to a fixed maximum range of 10,000 yards (9,100 m).

The system was working in the lab by June 1940, and was moved to Herring Cove, just south of Halifax, in July. Three naval ratings were trained in its operation and operated it in shifts. There was no sort of alarm or other indication, and the operators had to stare at the display 24/7. At this location the channel starts about 0.25 miles (0.40 km) offshore from the location of the radar, and the far shore is 2.5 miles (4.0 km) away, so targets appeared in the "near" side of the display. An improved three-stage receiver was installed nine months later, in the spring of 1941. Although the range was unchanged, the receiver was more sensitive and provided much better detection near the maximum range of the display.

Night Watchman was the first radar in operational use in North America. This caught the attention of the US, and a second unit was built for the United States Army Signal Corps in December 1940. This unit was built by men from Research Enterprises Limited (REL) in Toronto who had been sent to the NRC in Ottawa to learn radio technique. They also built a third set at the same time, which was used as a hot backup for the original set in Halifax. It is not recorded where the U.S.-bound set was used.

Although only three NW sets were constructed, it served to introduce the NRC and REL to radar construction and its lessons were put to use in the first Canadian shipboard radar, Canadian Submarine Control (CSC). (Note: ERA-141 states that the CSC was based on a modified version of the ASV Mk. II radar. That set had been given to the NRC during the Tizard Mission in October 1940. This post-dates the construction of the NW, so any connection is likely one of familiarity, not actual equipment.)
