= German submarine U-984 =

German World War II submarine

History

Nazi Germany
- Name: U-984
- Ordered: 25 May 1941
- Builder: Blohm & Voss, Hamburg
- Yard number: 184
- Laid down: 7 September 1942
- Launched: 12 May 1943
- Commissioned: 17 June 1943
- Fate: Sunk on or about 2 August 1944

General characteristics
- Class & type: Type VIIC submarine
- Displacement: 769 tonnes (757 long tons) surfaced; 871 t (857 long tons) submerged
- Length: 67.10 m (220 ft 2 in) o/a; 50.50 m (165 ft 8 in) pressure hull
- Beam: 6.20 m (20 ft 4 in) o/a; 4.70 m (15 ft 5 in) pressure hull
- Draught: 4.74 m (15 ft 7 in)
- Installed power: 2,800–3,200 PS (2,100–2,400 kW; 2,800–3,200 bhp) (diesels); 750 PS (550 kW; 740 shp) (electric)
- Propulsion: 2 shafts; 2 × diesel engines; 2 × electric motors
- Speed: 17.7 knots (32.8 km/h; 20.4 mph) surfaced; 7.6 knots (14.1 km/h; 8.7 mph) submerged
- Range: 8,500 nmi (15,700 km; 9,800 mi) at 10 knots (19 km/h; 12 mph) surfaced; 80 nmi (150 km; 92 mi) at 4 knots (7.4 km/h; 4.6 mph) submerged
- Test depth: 230 m (750 ft); Crush depth: 250–295 m (820–968 ft)
- Complement: 4 officers, 40–56 enlisted
- Armament: 5 × 53.3 cm (21 in) torpedo tubes (4 bow, 1 stern); 14 × torpedoes or 26 TMA mines; 1 × 8.8 cm (3.46 in) deck gun (220 rounds); 1 × twin 2 cm (0.79 in) C/30 anti-aircraft gun

Service record
- Part of: 5th U-boat Flotilla; 17 June 1943 – 31 July 1944; 9th U-boat Flotilla; 1 – 2 August 1944
- Identification codes: M 53 784
- Commanders: Oblt.z.S. Heinz Sieder; 17 June 1943 – 2 August 1944
- Operations: 5 patrols: 1st patrol: 4 January – 24 February 1944; 2nd patrol: 22 – 27 May 1944; 3rd patrol: 6 – 10 June 1944; 4th patrol: a. 12 – 19 June 1944; b. 21 June – 5 July 1944; 5th patrol: 26 July – 2 August 1944
- Victories: 3 merchant ships total loss (21,550 GRT); 1 warship total loss (1,300 tons); 1 merchant ship damaged (7,240 GRT)

German submarine U-984 was a Type VIIC U-boat built for Nazi Germany's Kriegsmarine for service during World War II. She was laid down on 7 September 1942 by Blohm & Voss, Hamburg as yard number 184, launched on 12 May 1943 and commissioned on 17 June 1943 under Oberleutnant zur See Heinz Sieder.

== Design ==
German Type VIIC submarines were preceded by the shorter Type VIIB submarines. U-984 had a displacement of 769 tonnes (757 long tons) when at the surface and 871 tonnes (857 long tons) while submerged. She had a total length of 67.10 m (220 ft 2 in), a pressure hull length of 50.50 m (165 ft 8 in), a beam of 6.20 m (20 ft 4 in), a height of 9.60 m (31 ft 6 in), and a draught of 4.74 m (15 ft 7 in). The submarine was powered by two Germaniawerft F46 four-stroke, six-cylinder supercharged diesel engines producing a total of 2,800 to 3,200 metric horsepower (2,060 to 2,350 kW; 2,760 to 3,160 shp) for use while surfaced, two Brown, Boveri & Cie GG UB 720/8 double-acting electric motors producing a total of 750 metric horsepower (550 kW; 740 shp) for use while submerged. She had two shafts and two 1.23 m (4 ft) propellers. The boat was capable of operating at depths of up to 230 metres (750 ft).

The submarine had a maximum surface speed of 17.7 knots (32.8 km/h; 20.4 mph) and a maximum submerged speed of 7.6 knots (14.1 km/h; 8.7 mph). When submerged, the boat could operate for 80 nautical miles (150 km; 92 mi) at 4 knots (7.4 km/h; 4.6 mph); when surfaced, she could travel 8,500 nautical miles (15,700 km; 9,800 mi) at 10 knots (19 km/h; 12 mph). U-984 was fitted with five 53.3 cm (21 in) torpedo tubes (four fitted at the bow and one at the stern), fourteen torpedoes, one 8.8 cm (3.46 in) SK C/35 naval gun, 220 rounds, and one twin 2 cm (0.79 in) C/30 anti-aircraft gun. The boat had a complement of between forty-four and sixty.

== Service history ==
The boat's career began with training at 5th U-boat Flotilla on 17 June 1943, followed by active service on 1 August 1944 as part of the 9th Flotilla for the remainder of her service.

On 22 January 1944, Maschinenobergefreiter Hermann Keller was lost overboard in the North Atlantic.

On 8 June 1944, U-984 was bombed by an unidentified Allied aircraft and was sufficiently damaged to force a return to base on 9 June

In 5 patrols she accounted for the total loss of 3 merchant ships, for a total of 21,550 gross register tons (GRT), one warship total loss (1,300 tons) and damaged one other merchant ship.

=== Wolfpacks ===
U-984 took part in four wolfpacks, namely:

- Rügen (14 – 26 January 1944)
- Stürmer (26 January – 3 February 1944)
- Igel 1 (3 – 17 February 1944)
- Dragoner (22 – 27 May 1944)

=== Fate ===
Sunk on or about 2 August 1944 in the English Channel south-west of Brighton in position 50°03.732′N 00°32.398′W by unknown cause. All hands were lost.

=== Previously recorded fate ===
U-984 was sunk on 20 August 1944 in the North Atlantic in the Bay of Biscay in position 48°16′N 05°33′W, by depth charges from Canadian destroyers HMCS Ottawa, HMCS Kootenay and HMCS Chaudiere. All hands were lost. U-984 has subsequently been positively identified as the U-boat sunk on or about 2 August 1944 in the English Channel south-west of Brighton, in position 50.03.732N, 00.32.398W, by unknown cause, with presently no plausible explanation for her loss in the wreck position.

== Summary of raiding history ==
Date	Ship Name	Nationality	Tonnage (Note: Merchant ship tonnages are in gross register tons. Military vessels are listed by tons displacement.)	Fate
25 June 1944	HMS Goodson	Royal Navy	1,300	Total loss
29 June 1944	Edward M. House	United States	7,240	Damaged
29 June 1944	H.G. Blasdel	United States	7,176	Total loss
29 June 1944	John A. Treutlen	United States	7,198	Total loss
29 June 1944	James A. Farrell	United States	7,176	Total loss

== See also ==
- Convoys HX 229/SC 122
- James D. Prentice

== Bibliography ==
- Busch, Rainer; Röll, Hans-Joachim (1999). German U-boat commanders of World War II : a biographical dictionary. Translated by Brooks, Geoffrey. London, Annapolis, Md: Greenhill Books, Naval Institute Press. ISBN 1-55750-186-6.
- Busch, Rainer; Röll, Hans-Joachim (1999). Der U-Boot-Krieg, 1939-1945: Deutsche U-Boot-Verluste von September 1939 bis Mai 1945 [German U-boat losses from September 1939 to May 1945] (in German). Vol. IV. Hamburg, Berlin, Bonn: Mittler. ISBN 3-8132-0514-2.
- Debus, Marc; Nell, Alfred (2017). Das letzte Geleit - vom Vorpostenboot zur U-Boot-Flotte : a autobiography. Translated by Toalster, David. Neu Anspach/Germany: Schreibstark-Verlag. ISBN 978-3946922193.
- Gröner, Erich; Jung, Dieter; Maass, Martin (1991). U-boats and Mine Warfare Vessels. German Warships 1815–1945. Vol. 2. Translated by Thomas, Keith; Magowan, Rachel. London: Conway Maritime Press. ISBN 0-85177-593-4.
- Sharpe, Peter (1998). U-Boat Fact File. Great Britain: Midland Publishing. ISBN 1-85780-072-9.
