= USS George (DE-697) =

Buckley-class destroyer escort

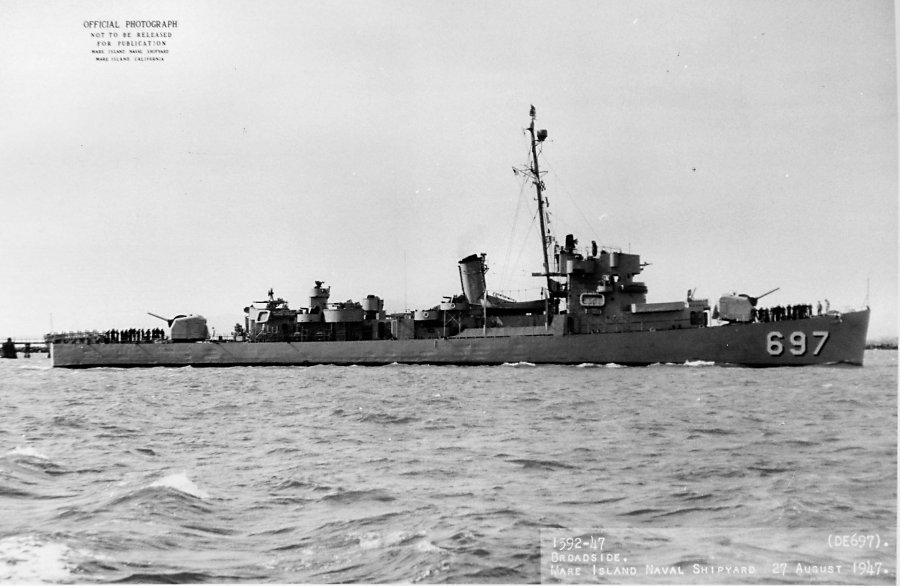

History

United States
- Name: USS George
- Namesake: Eugene F. George
- Ordered: 1942
- Builder: Defoe Shipbuilding Company, Bay City, Michigan
- Laid down: 22 May 1943
- Launched: 14 August 1943
- Commissioned: 20 November 1943
- Decommissioned: 8 October 1958
- Stricken: 1 November 1969
- Honors and awards: 2 battle stars (World War II)
- Fate: Sold for scrapping, 12 October 1970

General characteristics
- Class & type: Buckley-class destroyer escort
- Displacement: 1,400 long tons (1,422 t) light; 1,673 long tons (1,700 t) standard
- Length: 306 ft (93 m)
- Beam: 37 ft (11 m)
- Draft: 13 ft 6 in (4.11 m)
- Propulsion: 2 × boilers; General Electric turbo-electric drive; 12,000 shp (8.9 MW); 2 × solid manganese-bronze 3,600 lb (1,600 kg) 3-bladed propellers, 8 ft 6 in (2.59 m) diameter, 7 ft 7 in (2.31 m) pitch; 2 × rudders
- Speed: 24 knots (44 km/h; 28 mph)
- Complement: 186
- Armament: 3 × 3"/50 caliber guns; 1 × quad 1.1"/75 caliber gun; 8 × single 20 mm guns; 1 × triple 21 inch (533 mm) torpedo tubes; 1 × Hedgehog anti-submarine mortar (144 rounds); 8 × K-gun depth charge projectors; 2 × depth charge tracks

USS George (DE-697) was a Buckley-class destroyer escort. She was the second ship of the United States Navy named after Seaman Second Class Eugene F. George (1925–1942), who was posthumously awarded the Navy Cross for his heroism on USS San Francisco at the Naval Battle of Guadalcanal.

Eugene Frank George, the ship's namesake, was a sailor aboard the heavy cruiser USS San Francisco during the fighting around Guadalcanal on 12 November 1942. (Note: An earlier ship, USS George (DE-276), was named for him but was assigned to the United Kingdom under lend-lease on 22 June 1943; launched on 8 July 1943; transferred to the United Kingdom on 9 October 1943; and commissioned in the British Royal Navy as HMS Goodson.)

== Construction and commissioning ==
George was laid down on 22 May 1943 at the Defoe Shipbuilding Company, Bay City, Michigan. The ship was launched on 14 August 1943; sponsored by Mrs. Harlow F. George, the mother of Seaman George; and commissioned at New Orleans, Louisiana, on 20 November 1943.

== World War II ==
After shakedown off Bermuda, George sailed from Boston, Massachusetts on 11 January 1944 to escort a merchantman from Norfolk, Virginia to Nouméa, New Caledonia, where she arrived on 19 February. Until the spring of 1944, George escorted transports to the Admiralties, the New Hebrides, and the Solomons during consolidation operations in the Solomons. On 16 May, she sailed from Florida Island, in the Solomons, in a hunter-killer group with England (DE-635) and Raby (DE-698) on what was to become one of the most successful anti-submarine actions in the Pacific war.

During this patrol from 19 to 31 May, the three-ship team sank six Japanese submarines (I-16, Ro-104, Ro-105, Ro-106, Ro-108, and Ro-116) in waters north of the Bismarck Archipelago. George arrived at Manus Island on 4 June after this feat, and during the next three months, she conducted anti-submarine patrols and escorted merchantmen to the New Hebrides, the Solomons, and the Marshall Islands. After serving briefly as station-ship at Funafuti, Ellice Islands, she steamed to Australia, arriving at Sydney on 12 October.

After returning to Purvis Bay, Florida Island, on 28 October, George resumed anti-submarine patrols and escorted convoys to New Guinea, Manus, Guam, and Saipan. During the liberation of the Philippines, she escorted convoys out of Ulithi, and in February 1945, she escorted ships from Guam to Iwo Jima during the invasion and occupation of that embattled island. In addition, she served as air-sea rescue station, and on 18 April 1945, she rescued three survivors from a B-29 forced to ditch off Iwo Jima.

During the summer of 1945, she made two escort voyages to Okinawa, one each from Ulithi and Guam; and, after the Japanese surrender, she delivered surrender terms on 12 September to the Japanese garrison stationed on Truk, Carolines. She departed Guam on 18 September, and sailed for the United States, where she arrived at San Pedro, California, on 5 October.

== 1946–1958 ==
Between 10 March 1946 and 9 April 1947, George deployed with the United States Seventh Fleet in the Western Pacific. She operated along the Japanese coast and steamed to Tsingtao and Shanghai, China, where she supported American and Chinese Nationalist troops during occupation operations against the Communists in North China. From 1947 to 1951, she served with Escort Division 31, attached to the Fleet Sonar School at Pearl Harbor. George moved to San Diego with the Fleet Sonar School in 1951, and served there until undergoing overhaul at Pearl Harbor in the spring of 1953. Following return to San Diego in September 1953, she sailed for Sasebo, Japan, on 10 November, and conducted hunter-killer and screening operations in Japanese, Korean, and Okinawan waters. She returned to San Diego on 25 June 1954, and for more than a year, she operated out of San Diego along the coast of southern California.

George sailed on her next WestPac cruise on 4 October 1955. She operated out of Guam for more than two months, and conducted surveillances of the Carolines, Marianas, Bonin, and Volcano Islands before reaching Yokosuka, Japan, in January 1956. She participated in convoy, anti-submarine warfare, and gunnery exercises until 10 March when she sailed for the West Coast, arriving at San Diego on 31 March. Subsequently, she resumed operations out of San Diego, highlighted by an October 1956 cruise to British Columbia. On 3 January 1957, she again sailed to join the Seventh Fleet. After steaming to New Zealand and Japan, she served as station ship at Hong Kong; participated in Southeast Asia Treaty Organisation maneuvers off the Philippines; and operated from Guam on island surveillance patrols in the Marianas. Departing Guam on 10 June, she returned to San Diego on 7 July. In September 1957, George was assigned to duty as a reserve training ship operating from San Francisco. She decommissioned at San Francisco on 8 October 1958, and entered the Pacific Reserve Fleet at Stockton, California.

George was stricken from the Naval Vessel Register on 1 November 1969, and sold for scrapping on 12 October 1970.

== Awards ==
George received two battle stars for World War II service.
