= HMS Goodson =

Frigate of the Royal Navy

History

United States
- Name: USS George
- Namesake: Eugene F. George
- Builder: Boston Navy Yard
- Laid down: 20 May 1943
- Launched: 8 July 1943
- Fate: Transferred to Royal Navy, 9 October 1943

United Kingdom
- Name: HMS Goodson
- Acquired: 9 October 1943
- Fate: Returned to the USN, 21 October 1944; Sold 9 January 1947.

General characteristics
- Class & type: Evarts-class destroyer escort
- Displacement: 1,190 long tons (1,210 t) (standard)
- Length: 289 ft 5 in (88.2 m)
- Beam: 35 ft 2 in (10.7 m)
- Draught: 10 ft 1 in (3.1 m)
- Installed power: 6,000 shp (4,500 kW) electric motors
- Propulsion: 2 shafts; 4 diesel engines
- Speed: 20 knots (37 km/h; 23 mph)
- Range: 6,000 nmi (11,000 km; 6,900 mi) at 12 knots (22 km/h; 14 mph)
- Complement: 198
- Sensors & processing systems: SA & SL type radars; Type 144 series Asdic; MF Direction Finding; HF Direction Finding
- Armament: 3 × single 3 in (76 mm)/50 Mk 22 guns; 1 × twin Bofors 40 mm; 9 × single 20 mm Oerlikon guns; 1 × Hedgehog anti-submarine mortar; 2 × Depth charge rails and four throwers

HMS Goodson (K480), originally USS George (DE-276), was an Evarts-class destroyer escort, assigned to the United Kingdom under the lend-lease.

== Description ==
The Evarts-class ships had an overall length of 289 feet 5 inches (88.2 m), a beam of 35 feet 2 inches (10.7 m), and a draught of 10 feet 1 inch (3.1 m) at full load. They displaced 1,190 long tons (1,210 t) at (standard) and 1,416 long tons (1,439 t) at full load. The ships had a diesel–electric powertrain derived from a submarine propulsion system with four General Motors 16-cylinder diesel engines providing power to four General Electric electric generators which sent electricity to four 1,500-shaft-horsepower (1,100 kW) General Electric electric motors which drove the two propeller shafts. The destroyer escorts had enough power give them a speed of 20 knots (37 km/h; 23 mph) and enough fuel oil to give them a range of 6,000 nautical miles (11,000 km; 6,900 mi) at 12 knots (22 km/h; 14 mph). Their crew consisted of 198 officers and ratings.

The armament of the Evarts-class ships in British service consisted of three single mounts for 50-caliber 3-inch (76 mm)/50 Mk 22 dual-purpose guns; one superfiring pair forward of the bridge and the third gun aft of the superstructure. Anti-aircraft defence was intended to consisted of a twin-gun mount for 40-millimetre (1.6 in) Bofors anti-aircraft (AA) guns atop the rear superstructure with nine 20-millimetre (0.8 in) Oerlikon AA guns located on the superstructure, but production shortages meant that that not all guns were fitted, or that additional Oerlikons replaced the Bofors guns. A Mark 10 Hedgehog anti-submarine mortar was positioned just behind the forward gun. The ships were also equipped with two depth charge rails at the stern and four "K-gun" depth charge throwers.

== Construction and career ==
The ship was laid down as George on 20 May 1943 at the Boston Navy Yard, and named after Eugene Frank George, posthumously awarded the Navy Cross at Guadalcanal. She was assigned to the United Kingdom under the lend-lease on 22 June 1943; launched on 8 July 1943; transferred to the United Kingdom on 9 October 1943; and commissioned in the British Royal Navy as HMS Goodson.

During the remainder of World War II, she served on escort and patrol duty in the Atlantic and along the English coast. The ship supported the Allied Invasion of Europe at Normandy on 6 June 1944. Damaged on 25 June by U-984 commanded by Heinz Sieder and declared a constructive total loss, she was returned to the United States Navy on 21 October. On 9 January 1947 she was sold for scrap to John Lee of Belfast, Northern Ireland.
