= James D. Prentice =

Canadian naval officer (1899–1979)

J.D. Prentice
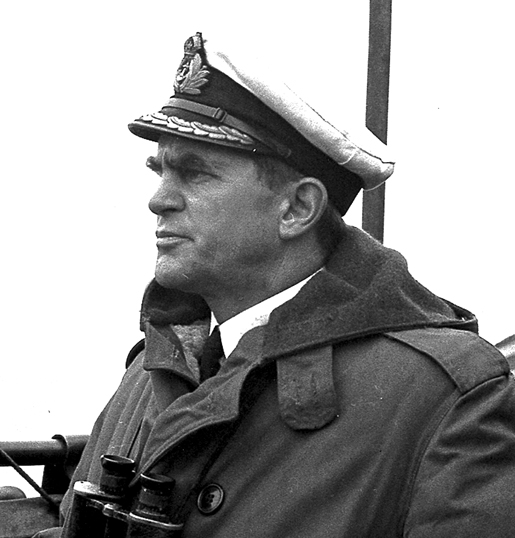
- Born: 25 April 1899; Victoria, British Columbia
- Died: 14 March 1979 (aged 79); Saanichton, British Columbia
- Military career
- Allegiance: Canada
- Branch: Royal Navy; Royal Canadian Navy
- Service years: 1912–1934; 1939–1946
- Rank: Captain
- Nickname: Chummy
- Commands: HMCS Chambly; HMCS Ottawa; HMCS Qu'Appelle
- Conflicts: Second World War: Battle of the Atlantic; Operation Overlord
- Awards: Distinguished Service Order; Distinguished Service Cross
- Other work: Aide-de-camp to the Governor General

Captain James Douglas 'Chummy' Prentice DSO DSC (1899–1979) was a Canadian Royal Navy and Royal Canadian Navy officer who served with distinction in the Battle of the Atlantic. In addition to being credited with the destruction of four U-boats while at sea, he also played a significant role ashore in training the often inexperienced recruits required by the Royal Canadian Navy to fulfill its expanded wartime role.

== Naval career ==
Although born and raised in British Columbia, he decided to join the Royal Navy in 1912 when his father forbade him from joining the newly formed Royal Canadian Navy. He retired from the RN in 1934 as a Lieutenant Commander when cutbacks during the Great Depression ended his possibility of promotion. He returned to British Columbia after his retirement from the Royal Navy and had been ranching for a living when the Second World War broke out in 1939.

After an initial period ashore in Sydney, Nova Scotia Prentice was appointed Senior Officer, Canadian Corvettes under Commodore Leonard W. Murray. This position gave him the dual responsibilities of developing tactical doctrine for all Royal Canadian Navy corvettes as well as being Captain of the Flower-class corvette HMCS Chambly, part of the Newfoundland Escort Force. It was in this latter capacity that Prentice scored Canada's first U-boat kill, shared with HMCS Moose Jaw. This action would lead to Prentice receiving the DSO.

After his time in corvettes, Prentice was assigned to develop training and doctrine for the new Canadian destroyers that entered into service in 1942. In March 1943 the RCN disseminated Prentice's tactical manual for Atlantic convoy escort commanders, Hints on Escort Work, which called for 'quick attacks' on U-boats using Corvettes. He received command of HMCS Ottawa and was appointed Senior Captain, Canadian Destroyers in 1943. After a time as senior officer of Escort Group C5 in the Mid-Atlantic, Prentice became senior officer of Escort Group 11 for Operation Overlord. On 7 July Ottawa collaborated in the sinking of U-678 in the English Channel. EG11 transferred to the Bay of Biscay in August, where Prentice and Ottawa played a part in the sinkings of U-621 on 18 August and U-984 on 20 August. For these actions, Prentice was awarded the Distinguished Service Cross (DSC) on 28 November and bar a week later.

Prentice finished the war as a full captain. After a time as Aide-de-Camp to the Governor General of Canada, he retired in 1946. He died in British Columbia in 1979.

== See also ==
- Convoy SC 42
