= Research Enterprises Limited =

Coordinates: 43.712821°N 79.354868°W

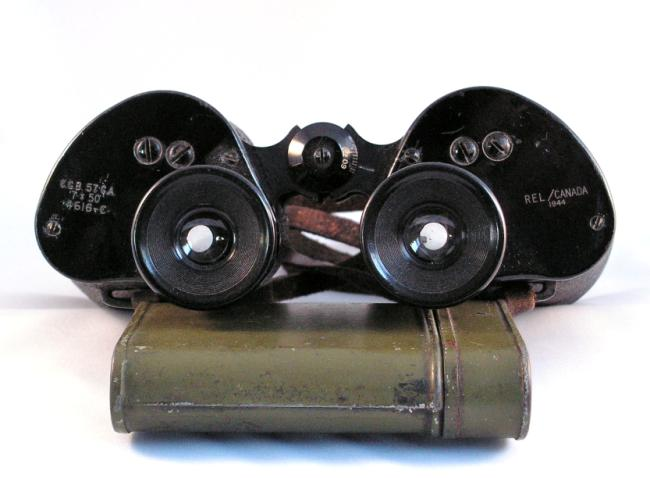
One of REL's more popular products was their 7 × 50 military binoculars.

Research Enterprises Limited (REL for short) was a short-lived Toronto-based Crown Corporation that built electronics and optical instruments during World War II. They existed only six years from late 1940 until 1946, and were active only from late 1941, but during that period they became Leaside's largest employer, producing C$220 million worth of radar systems and optical instruments ($3,843 million in 2025). After the war, the government rapidly closed the various wartime companies it had started. After REL was closed, their factories formed the basis of a Corning Glass plant, Philips Electronics, and a variety of other firms. Today only a few of the original buildings still stand, used primarily for light industrial and small commercial enterprises.

== History ==
=== NRC optics shop ===
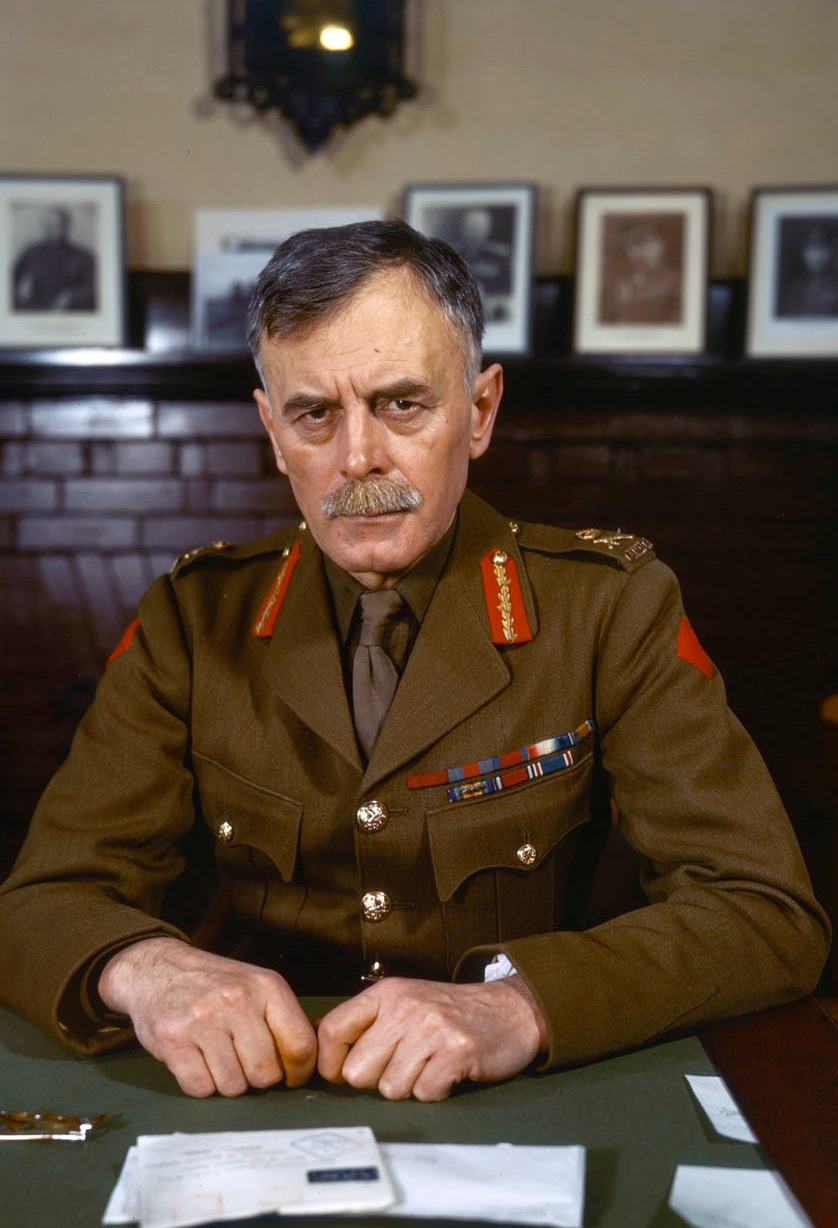
REL owes its existence to the demands of General Andrew McNaughton, who was concerned about a lack of optical equipment after the Canadian experience in World War I.

In August 1939, General Andrew McNaughton, President of the National Research Council (NRC), asked the head of the NRC's Optics Section, Leslie E. Howlett, to prepare a report on how to set up an optics industry in Canada. McNaughton remembered the acute shortages of any sort of optical equipment in World War I and intended to address this. Howlett returned a report on 11 September, stating that the first task should be to visit their US counterparts in the National Bureau of Standards (NBS) and ask their advice. McNaughton immediately approved his plan, and Howlett left for Washington, DC on the 13th.

In Washington, Howlett found that his counterparts at the NBS had faced exactly the same problem in WWI, and were happy to provide complete details of their solutions. On his way back to Ottawa, Howlett visited Bausch and Lomb (B&L) in Rochester and Spencer Lens (of the American Optical Company) in Buffalo, both of whom were equally forthcoming with information. Howlett completed his report to McNaughton in October. McNaughton took the report to the Government, but found them unwilling to provide funds.

The NRC had funds available in its budget, and the new director, Jack Mackenzie (who took over from McNaughton), was convinced to start initial work on the concept. On 16 November, Mackenzie asked Howlett to draw up floor plans for an optical shop for the NRC, and funding was provided on 20 November. The shop was up and running by early 1940, and on 1 March it was put under the direction of J. N. Cairns. By the end of April, the shop was turning out samples of all sorts of optical equipment.

=== Building the optics factory ===
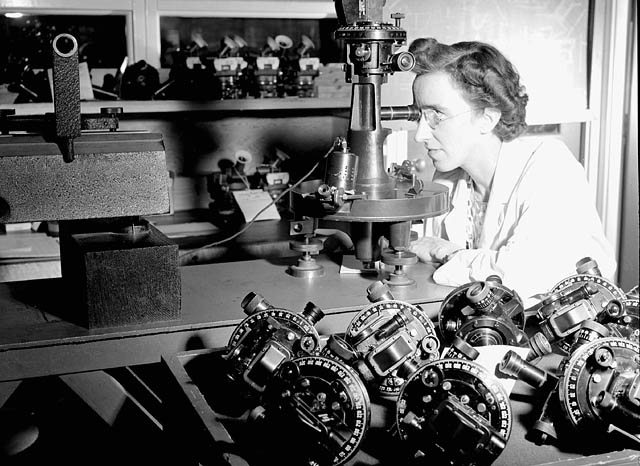
An REL employee tests artillery gun sights in the summer of 1943.

By this time, McNaughton had moved to England where he commanded the Canadian Army. Early that year, a Lt.Col. Harrison of the Department of Munitions and Supply visited McNaughton in the UK, where McNaughton convinced him of the necessity of setting up a real optics factory. Harrison returned to Canada, and on 26 April 1940 called a meeting to discuss the idea. He was convinced the easiest solution was to simply get the Americans to do it, and they approached the Spencer Lens to set up shop in Canada, but they proved skeptical.

The fall of France and the Dunkirk Evacuation convinced the authorities immediate action was needed, and the Optics Section received a request for the floor plan of a complete factory on 11 June 1940. After short consideration, the decision was made, apparently by C. D. Howe, to build the factory as a Crown Corporation known as Research Enterprises Limited. The company was formally established on 16 July with George Sweny as the General Manager. Early consideration was given to building the factory in the Ottawa area, close to the NRC, but Sweny convinced them that Toronto's labor pool was more suitable.

On 30 June, Howlett traveled to the US with professor R.J. Montgomery of the University of Toronto who had recently joined the Optics Section. Montgomery had previously worked at B&L in Rochester. They returned to Washington along with a draftsman to collect a list of the machinery they would need to equip a factory. In August, Sweny, Howlett and Henderson went to Toronto to scout locations, and picked the Leaside Business Park. This was formerly the home of the World War I-era Leaside Aerodrome, but by this time being used by a number of small industrial companies and was well served by a major line of the Canadian Pacific Railway, and was the site of a major Canadian National Railway maintenance depot.

With the location selected, the NCR issued orders for all of the equipment, including a furnace, stirrers and casting machines. Believing the US was going to enter the war and that machine supplies would dry up, the NCR placed additional orders for machine tools and other supplies, to the order of $600,000 ($10,480,851 in 2025). On 27 August, Howe appointed Lt.Col. W. E. Phillips to the board, and he replaced Sweny as GM on 30 November. Sod was turned on 16 September 1940, and the first glass poured on 5 June 1941.

=== Tizard Mission ===
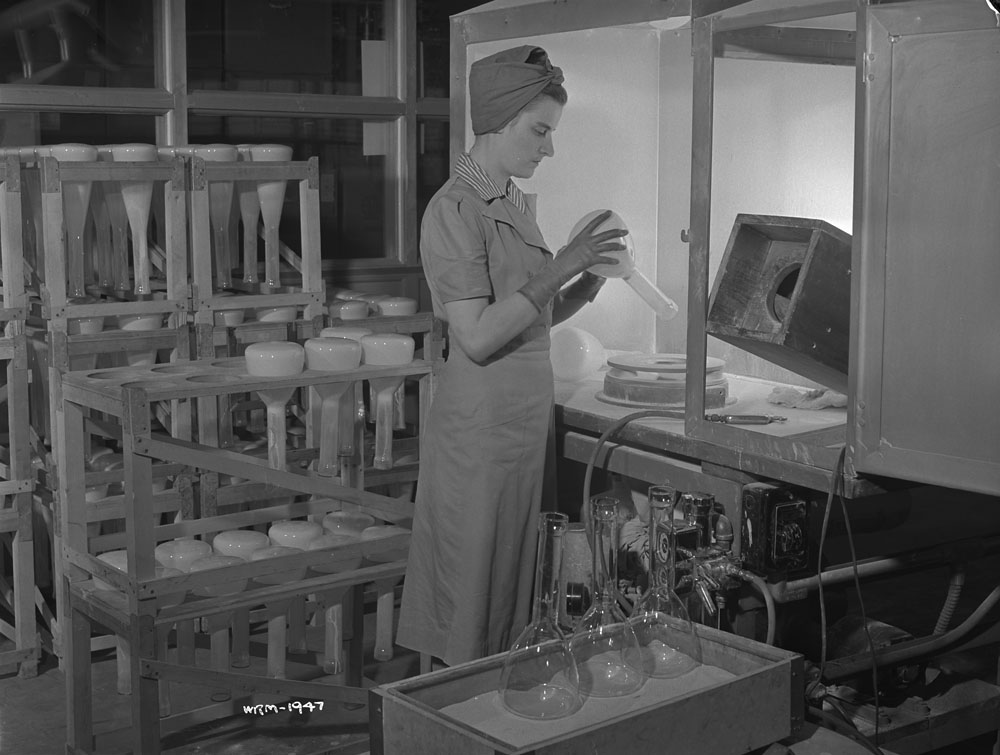
Another issue revealed during the Tizard Mission was the need for CRTs, a product that REL's glass plant was able to quickly provide. Here the glass bulbs are being coated with phosphorus paint to produce the display surface.

On 16 August, Henry Tizard visited the NRC as part of what would become the Tizard Mission. He met Mackenzie and Fowler but found them preoccupied, testing a local invention that proceeded to fail. He spent the rest of the day meeting politicians and had dinner with Prime Minister Mackenzie King. Over the next three days he surveyed the Canadian research capabilities, and was told by Fowler that the NRC had little to do, which is why they were testing silly inventions.

When he asked about radar, knowing they had been briefed on the topic by famous Canadian explorer Charles Wright in early 1939, Tizard was saddened to learn that only a small amount of money had been spent on studying the matter, and this only started in September 1939. Although several rounds of funding had followed, including $40,000 in May 1940, the NRC efforts had been somewhat bumbling, successful only in developing a Coast Defence radar, Night Watchman, that was state-of-the-art for 1938. Nevertheless, with this minor success, in July the government approved the building of a small radar factory employing 130 to 140 people.

Having moved on to Washington on 9 September, Tizard was later joined by a small team from the NRC to coordinate the efforts of the three nations. Tizard told Fowler that they should immediately begin to work on starting production of the air-to-surface-vessel (ASV) radar, used to search for ships and submarines. Of the variety of small radars developed by that time, ASV was technically the simplest. After the main work of the Mission was over, on 24 October the remaining Tizard Mission members returned to Ottawa and found that their meetings the previous month had a profound effect. Instead of the small radar factory originally envisioned, plans were now underway for a major electronics factory, employing hundreds. Just how large was the only matter of debate.

Tizard had returned to the UK by this point, and his position with the coordinating group had been taken over by John Cockcroft. The NRC explained that plans had not been formalized because the UK government had not placed any firm orders, nor indicated when or how large those orders might be. Cockcroft took it upon himself to write an official memo outlining a development plan including the immediate construction of a factory to build ASV sets for both UK and US use, followed by a microwave-frequency gun-laying set for anti-aircraft guns, and another seven projects of lower priority. He also suggested building out the capacity to produce the required vacuum tubes and similar electronics to support the programs. He concluded that the factory should be large enough to support sales to both the UK and US.

=== Electronics factory ===
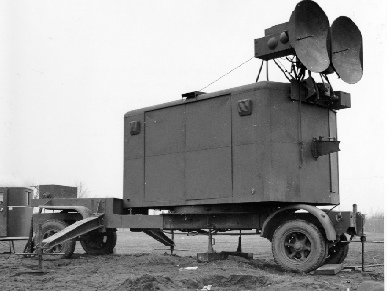
The GL Mk. IIIc was one of REL's more notorious products, released without factory testing and considered largely unusable as delivered.

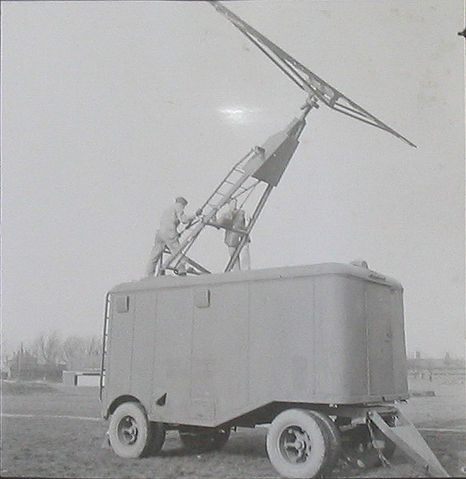
Much more successful was the Zone Position Indicator radar, or ZPI. A follow-on version, the MZPI, would go on to be the standard medium-range system in Canada, the UK and the US.

An office was opened in Toronto on 3 September 1940 to oversee the expansion, and the week of 14 to 20 October saw "much activity" by Howe, Sweny, Phillips and R.A. Hackbusch. Hackbusch had been hired away from Stromberg-Carlson by Phillips in order to run the electronics division.

Phillips quickly produced the design for an electronics factory, initially to produce cathode ray tubes, whose lack of production was a serious problem for UK radar efforts at that time. REL's existing optics side would be ideal for supporting this. A cost-plus contract for a 50,000 square feet (4,600 m^{2}) shop employing 500 workers, along with a gatehouse and cafeteria, were approved by Cabinet on 16 November. $750,000 ($13,101,064 today) was provided on 28 December. A September contract for $124,000 in machine tools was raised to $700,000. The plant would be owned by REL, but managed by General Electric.

To support the opening of the factory, Phillips arranged for a number of engineers to be hosted by the NRC's Radio Branch over the winter of 1940/41 while the factory was under construction. The buildings were completed in March and the equipment installed rapidly. Canada Wire and Cable, already in Leaside, began expanding with the addition of a vulcanizing drop tower to produce the insulated wires needed to carry high-voltage radar signals. Northern Electric was placed in charge of starting production of the micropup tubes used in the ASV sets as well as the cavity magnetron used in more modern designs.

By August, the electronics factory already had orders totalling $36,798,000 ($642,790,596 today), mostly radar systems of UK design that were being sold to the US. However, the company quickly fell behind on their deliveries, and put the blame on a number of engineering changes ordered by the Radio Branch of the NRC. A round of fingerpointing soon broke out, which had to be smoothed over by McNaughton, who made notes in his diary about his correspondence with Phillips:

and said there was a general deterioration of the nerves these days, people were tired and there was a lot of loss of control. I told him we did not intend to do anything about it, but any time he wished to check up we had facts that would be satisfactory. It was a very interesting interview.

Although delivery rates began to improve, quality became a serious problem. During 1942, Mackenzie of the NRC became increasingly suspicious that Hackebusch was the ultimate cause of the problems. On 11 November 1942, Col. Wallace visited REL with two of the NRC section heads and began interviewing people on the shop floor. One superintendent admitted that Hackebusch personally ordered him to concentrate on quantity rather than quality, and that in order to improve delivery times, units were being shipped untested. It also became clear that Hackebusch had kept this from Phillips.

During a visit to Ottawa in March 1943, Phillips met with Mackenzie and Wallace and agreed the problem was real, admitting "all the weaknesses of Hackbusch and [said] they are going to make a fundamental change which we all know is overdue by at least two years." But it was not until 2 September that Hackbusch was gone. A week later, Wallace was given the job, although he remained Director of the Radio Branch at NRC as well. When Mackenzie visited on 30 March 1944, he reported that the company was completely reorganized. Nevertheless, the setbacks proved fatal to the efforts, and was never able to deliver sets that competed with the rapidly improving designs from the UK and especially the US.

By the end of the war, REL had shipped thousands of radar sets of a variety of models. Among these were the Chain Home Low systems for the US that were rushed into service in the Canal Zone, as well as being the primary supplier of the UK's GL Mk. III radar system used to automatically aim anti-aircraft artillery. To support their construction, the company also ran a training facility in concert with the NRC, located near today's Bluffer's Park in Scarborough. The Scarborough site was used to test the pioneering DATAR computer in the 1950s.

=== Wind-down and closure ===
At its peak in 1944, the company plants covered the majority of the area between Eglinton Avenue on the north, Laird Drive on the west, and Research Road on the south, along with smaller shops and storage extending to Wicksteed Avenue further south. In total, the company estate covered 55 acres (22 ha), had 750,000 square feet (70,000 m^{2}) of floor space, employed 7,500 men and women (in about equal numbers), and produced $220 million ($3,843 million in 2025) worth of radar systems and optical instruments. They were the largest single employer to ever operate in the Leaside area.

By the middle of 1944 the Canadian Army was in combat in Europe, and was well supplied and equipped. The US had brought their own massive production capacity to bear, and were no longer placing large orders with Canadian firms. Orders for military equipment were dwindling, and in December 1944 the company laid off 1,000 workers, including 600 local residents. Some of the vacated factory area was later used by another Crown Corporation, Turbo Research, but like REL they found their funding was dwindling as the war effort wound down. Turbo Research was purchased by Avro Canada in 1946 and became Orenda Engines, moving to Malton on the west side of the city.

With the ending of the war there was some political debate about keeping the larger Crown companies under government control, selling them whole, or simply closing them as rapidly as possible. The later came to pass, due to a policy of not competing with private companies during peacetime, and REL was shut down entirely in September 1946. This was part of a wider drop in employment in the Leaside area, which dwindled from 13,290 in 1943 to 5,712 in 1946.

=== Re-use ===
Parts of the REL factories were soon purchased by other companies, large and small. The optical plant was taken over by Corning Glass, who produced Pyrex at the site for many years. Portions of the electronics factory were taken over by Honeywell Controls, others were used by Rogers-Majestic (the original Rogers Communications) until that was sold to Canadian Radio Manufacturing and then again to Philips. Other buildings became Lincoln Electric Motors.

Philips built a new three-story executive office building on the site known as "The White House", which was officially opened by Paul Hellyer and Ontario Premier William Davis in 1966. The building's illuminated sign was a local landmark. Philips moved their operations to Scarborough in 1976. Honeywell followed to Scarborough as well, before closing the new plant in December 2011. The Canada Wire plant moved to Markham in 1996 and is today known as Nexans North America. Lincoln remains as the only major manufacturing plant in Leaside as of 2014, having expanded several times.

== Products ==
One of REL's best known products were their binoculars. A common 6x30 set was produced to the extent of about 50,000 examples, while a 7x50 set added another 25,000 examples. A very small number, about six, of an experimental 20x72 were also built.

Another well known REL product was a series of telescopic sights for the Lee–Enfield No. 4 MK. I* (T) sniper rifle. These were initially copies of the British model and were delivered as the C No. 32 Mk. I, but deliveries were slowed due to demands for glass and production facilities for the wide variety of instruments then under construction, everything from gunsights for tanks and artillery to observer's telescopes to the binoculars. By the end of the war, 326 C No. 32 Mk. I's had been delivered, along with 113 C No. 32 Mk. IA and 255 C No. 32 Mk. II. A quantity of C No. 32 MK. 3 telescopes were also made. Unhappy with the C No. 32, REL experimented with a number of commercial designs, and eventually delivered the C No. 67 MK. I, which was initially labelled by the British as C No. 32 MK. IV against Canadian wishes and was 10 ounces (280 g) lighter than the British models.

Among many electronics products were the CHL and GL radars, ASV Mk. II radar for the US, IFF transponders, height finder radar and microwave-frequency early warning radar of Canadian design.
