= ASV Mark II radar =

Type of aircraft radar

ASV Mk. II
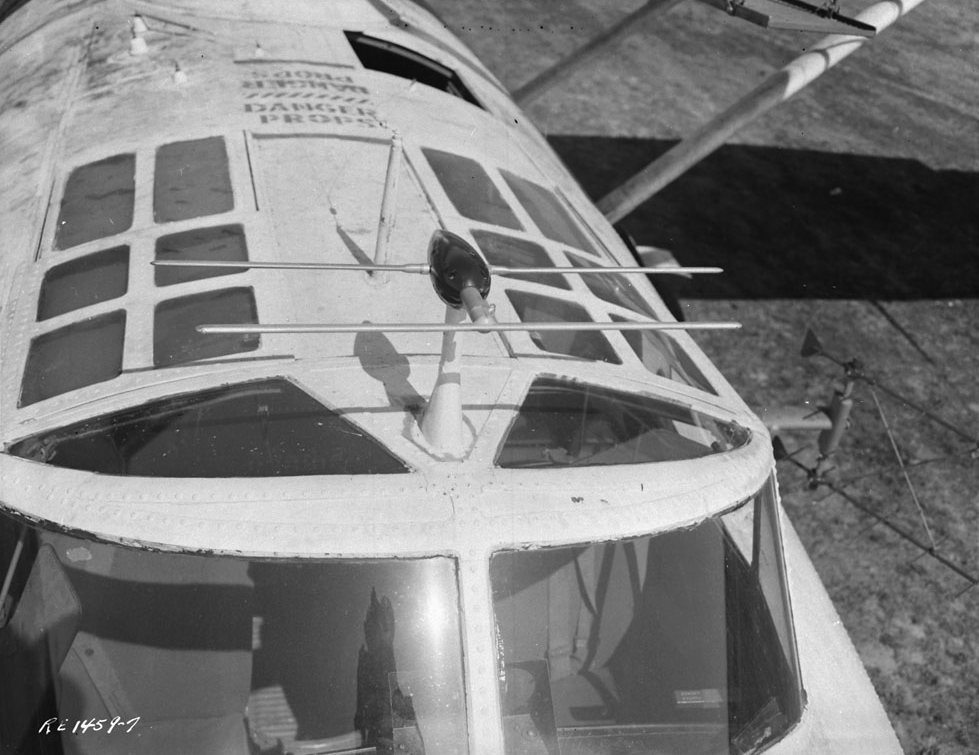
- ASV Mk. II antennas on a RCAF Consolidated Canso (PBY Catalina). The transmitter is on top of the cockpit, the darker-colored port-side receiver is mounted below and to the right, angled outward.
- Country of origin: UK
- Introduced: 1940
- No. built: ~24,600
- Type: Sea-surface search
- Frequency: 176 MHz (VHF)
- PRF: 400 pps
- Beamwidth: ~150 degrees
- Pulsewidth: 2.6 μs
- Range: 1 to 40 miles (1.6–64.4 km)
- Precision: ~5 degrees
- Power: 7 kW
- Other names: Type 286, ASE (US Navy), SCR-521 (US Army)

Radar, Air to Surface Vessel, Mark II, or ASV Mk. II for short, was an airborne sea-surface search radar developed by the UK's Air Ministry immediately prior to the start of World War II. It was the first aircraft-mounted radar of any sort to be used operationally. It was widely used by aircraft of the RAF Coastal Command, Fleet Air Arm and similar groups in the United States and Canada. A version was also developed for small ships, the Royal Navy's Type 286.

The system was developed between late 1937 and early 1939, following the accidental detection of ships in the English Channel by an experimental air-to-air radar. The original ASV Mk. I entered service in early 1940 and was quickly replaced by the greatly improved Mk. II. A single Mk. II was shipped to the US during the Tizard Mission in December 1940, where it demonstrated its ability to detect large ships at a range of 60 miles (97 km). Production was immediately taken up by Philco in the US and Research Enterprises Limited in Canada, with over 17,000 produced for use in the US alone.

It was Mk. II equipped Fairey Swordfish that located the German battleship Bismarck in heavy overcast skies, torpedoing her and leading to her destruction the next day. Mk. II was only partially effective against the much smaller U-boats, especially as the signal faded as the aircraft approached the target and they would lose contact at night. To close the gap, the Leigh light was introduced, allowing the U-boat to be picked up visually after it passed off the radar display. With the introduction of the Leigh light, night-time U-boat interceptions became common, and turned the German ports in the Bay of Biscay into death-traps.

A microwave-frequency ASV radar, ASVS, was under development since 1941, but the required cavity magnetrons were in limited supply and priority was given to H2S. The capture of a Mk. II-equipped Vickers Wellington by the Germans led to the introduction of the Metox radar detector tuned to its frequencies. This was soon followed by British pilots reporting submarines diving as the aircraft began to approach. A new design based on H2S, ASV Mk. III, was rushed to service, replacing the Mk. II beginning in 1943. Mk. II remained in use throughout the war in other theatres.

== Development ==
=== Background ===
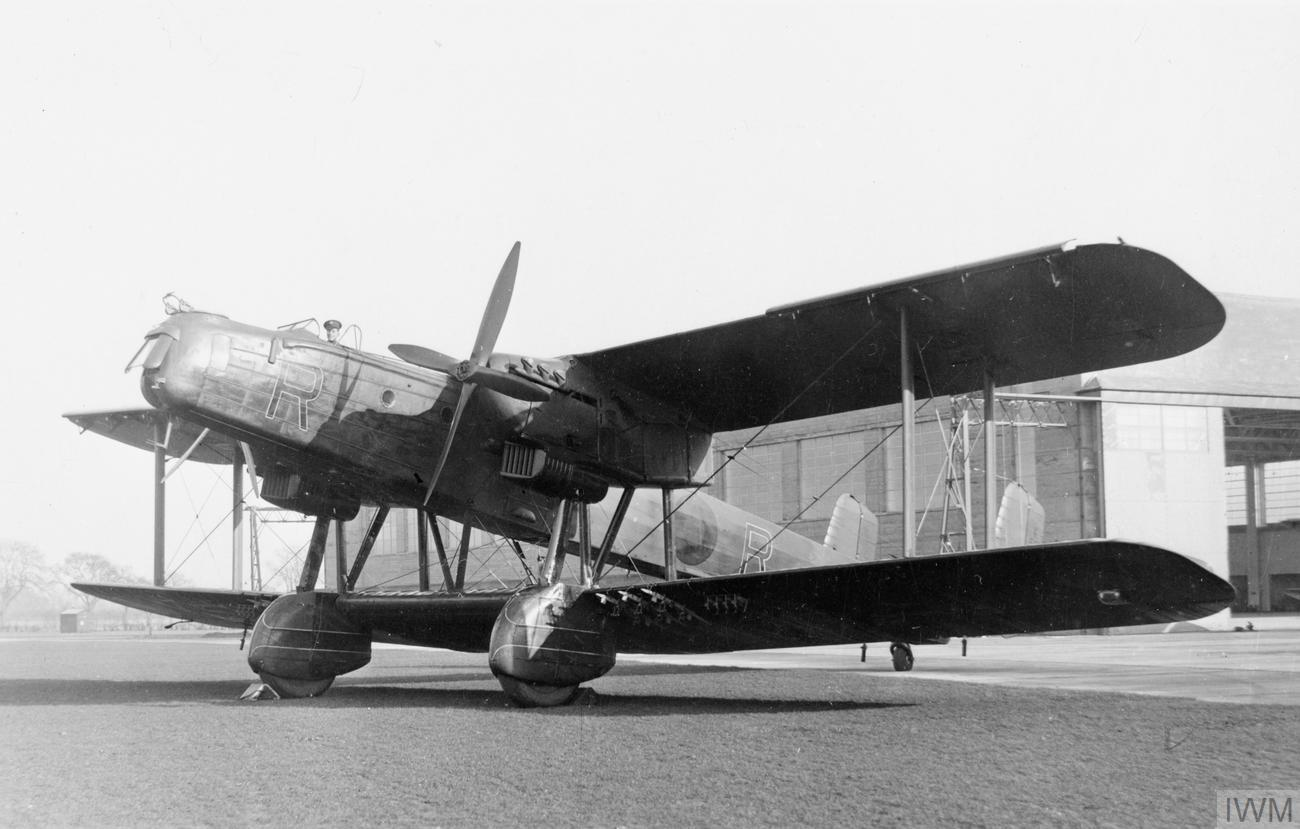
Early units worked on such long wavelengths that the only available aircraft that was large enough to carry the antennas was this Heyford.

Early during the development of the first British radar system, Chain Home (CH), Henry Tizard became concerned that the CH system might become so effective that the German air force (Luftwaffe) would be forced to turn to night bombing. If so, this would present a new problem for Britain, since CH alone couldn't provide the accuracy its fighter pilots needed to target bombers at night. After all, CH could locate an invading plane to no better than about 1 mile (1.6 km) in range, couldn't determine its bearing accurately and was even worse at estimating its elevation. Combined with the fact that a fighter pilot at night could see no farther than about 1,000 feet (300 m), this meant there would be a significant coverage gap for the enemy to exploit. He concluded that to be effective against night bombing, British pilots would need additional guidance to supplement Chain Home. Tizard wrote a memo on the topic on 27 April 1936 and sent it to Hugh Dowding, who was at that time the Air Member for Research and Development, and copied Robert Watson-Watt at the CH research center at Bawdsey Manor in Suffolk.

Over meetings Watson-Watt held with his research team in Orford at the local Crown and Castle hotel, they ultimately agreed that the best solution to the problem was to develop a small radar that could be mounted in an aircraft. The idea was that if the CH system could get a fighter to the general area of the enemy plane — within a mile or so — then the aircraft's own radar could be used guide it close enough for the pilot to see the plane visually and target it. Edward "Taffy" Bowen asked to take on the project, and formed a small team in August 1936 to consider the problem. They gave the concept the name RDF Project 2, or simply RDF 2. (Note: The term "RDF" was created with the intent to mislead by those involved in the project, who hoped the enemy would confuse it with the better-known field of radio direction finding, also called RDF.) It would later come to be known as airborne radar, and would soon evolve into the related fields of aircraft interception (AI) radar and aircraft-to-surface-vessel (ASV) radar. (Meanwhile, the technology of Chain Home, originally called RDF, was renamed RDF 1.)

The major problem faced by the Airborne Group was the problem of wavelength. For a variety of reasons, an antenna with reasonable gain has to be on the same order of length as the wavelength of the signal, with the half-wave dipole being a common solution. CH worked at wavelengths on the order of 10 metres, which called for antennas about 5 metres (16 ft) long, far too large to be practically carried on an aircraft. Through 1936 the team's primary concern was the development of radio systems operating at much shorter wavelengths, eventually settling on a set working at 6.7 m, based on an experimental television receiver built at EMI.

=== Discovery ===
In early 1937 the Airborne Group received a number of Western Electric Type 316A doorknob vacuum tubes. These were suitable for building transmitter units of about 20 W continual power for wavelengths of 1 to 10 m. Percy Hibberd built a new push–pull amplifier using two of these tubes working at 1.25 m wavelength; below 1.25 m the sensitivity dropped off sharply. Gerald Touch converted the EMI receiver to the same frequency by using it as the intermediate frequency portion of a superheterodyne circuit. The new sets were fitted to a Handley Page Heyford in March 1937.

On its first flight the set demonstrated very limited range against aircraft. However, while flying the aircraft about, the operators saw odd returns appearing on the display. They finally realized these were from the wharves and cranes at the Harwich docks miles south of Bawdsey. Shipping also appeared, but the team was unable to test this very well as the Heyford was forbidden to fly over water.

With this accidental discovery of ship detection, the team was given two Avro Anson maritime patrol aircraft, K6260 and K8758, along with five pilots stationed at nearby RAF Martlesham Heath to test this role. Early tests demonstrated a problem with noise from the ignition system interfering with the receiver, but this was soon resolved by fitters at the Royal Aircraft Establishment (RAE).

On its first real test on 17 August, Anson K6260 with Touch and Keith Wood aboard immediately detected shipping in the English Channel at a range of 2 to 3 miles (3.2–4.8 km). This was particularly impressive given the very low power of the transmitter, about 100 W per pulse.

=== Demonstration ===
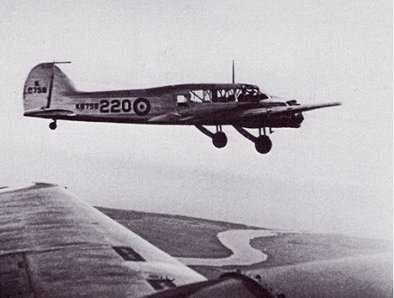
Avro Anson K8758, as seen from K6260. The experimental radar on K6260 made the fateful detection of Courageous and Southampton that led to the ASV efforts.

By this time, Watson-Watt had moved to Air Ministry headquarters in London. He heard of the successful test and called the team to ask if they would be available for a demonstration in early September. Plans were underway to run military exercises in the Channel, including a combined fleet of Royal Navy ships and RAF Coastal Command aircraft, and Watson-Watt wanted to crash the party. On the afternoon of 3 September 1937 K6260 successfully detected the battleship HMS Rodney, the aircraft carrier HMS Courageous and the light cruiser HMS Southampton, receiving very strong returns.

The next day they took off at dawn and, in almost complete overcast, detected Courageous and Southampton at a distance of 5 to 6 miles (8.0–9.7 km). As they approached the ships the Anson eventually became visible through the clouds, and the team could see the Courageous launching aircraft in a futile effort to intercept them. The weather was so bad that the operators had to use the radar as a navigation system to find their way home, using the reflection off seaside cliffs.

The promise of the system was not lost on observers; Albert Percival Rowe of the Tizard Committee commented that "This, had they known, was the writing on the wall for the German Submarine Service."

=== Continued development ===
For the next year, Bowen's team found themselves working much more on the ASV than AI. Much of this involved the development of new antenna systems, more advanced than the system on the Anson where a dipole was held outside the escape hatch and rotated by hand to hunt for signals. Among the experiments was a motorized rotating dipole that scanned the entire area around the aircraft and displayed angles as the X-axis and range on the Y-axis. This appears to be the first example of what is today known as a B-scope.

ASV proved easy to develop for a variety of reasons. One was that the host aircraft tended to be very large, so equipment size and weight were not as critical as it was in the much smaller night fighters. It was also easier to move around in these aircraft while fitting the equipment. Another reason was that these aircraft tended to fly at slower speeds, which meant that larger antennas could be used for better reception without seriously affecting aircraft performance. The early units used standard quarter-wave dipoles mounted on the nose area, but these were later extended to three-quarter wave in production units.

But the major reason that ASV was easier to develop than AI was the behaviour of the very high frequency (VHF) radio waves when interacting with water. In the case of AI, when the radar's signal hit the ground it tended to scatter in all directions, sending some part of the signal back towards the aircraft. Although only a small portion of the original signal was returned, the ground was essentially infinite in size so this ground return was still much more powerful than the reflection from a target. An aircraft flying at the typical German bomber altitude of 15,000 feet (4.6 km) could only see aircraft within 15,000 feet, anything beyond that was hidden in the ground return. This was a much shorter range than the 5 miles needed to close the gap with Chain Home.

In comparison, when the same signal hit the water it tended to reflect rather than scatter, sending the majority of the signal forward and away from the aircraft. The only time the signal could be seen is when the aircraft approached the water very closely when some of it would strike the water just in front of the aircraft and scattering off waves would cause a ground return. Even then the signal was relatively small compared to the huge ground return seen in the AI case, and only caused problems within about 0.5 miles (0.80 km) of the aircraft, although this could grow to as much as 4.5 miles (7.2 km) in high sea states. This would turn out to be an important limitation in practice, but one that was ultimately solved in a roundabout fashion.

Finally, the shape of the targets as seen from the radar were ideal for detection. The side of the ship, rising vertically from the surface of the water, created a partial corner reflector. Radio signals hitting the target directly were returned to the receiver, but so was any signal reflecting forward off the water close to the ship, as this signal would also strike the ship and reflect back to the receiver. Whereas aircraft were difficult to detect beyond about 4 miles (6.4 km), ships could be easily detected at distances on the order of 10 miles (16 km). Any vertical surface worked in this way, including seaside cliffs, which could be picked up at very long range and proved to be extremely useful for navigation.

=== New tubes ===
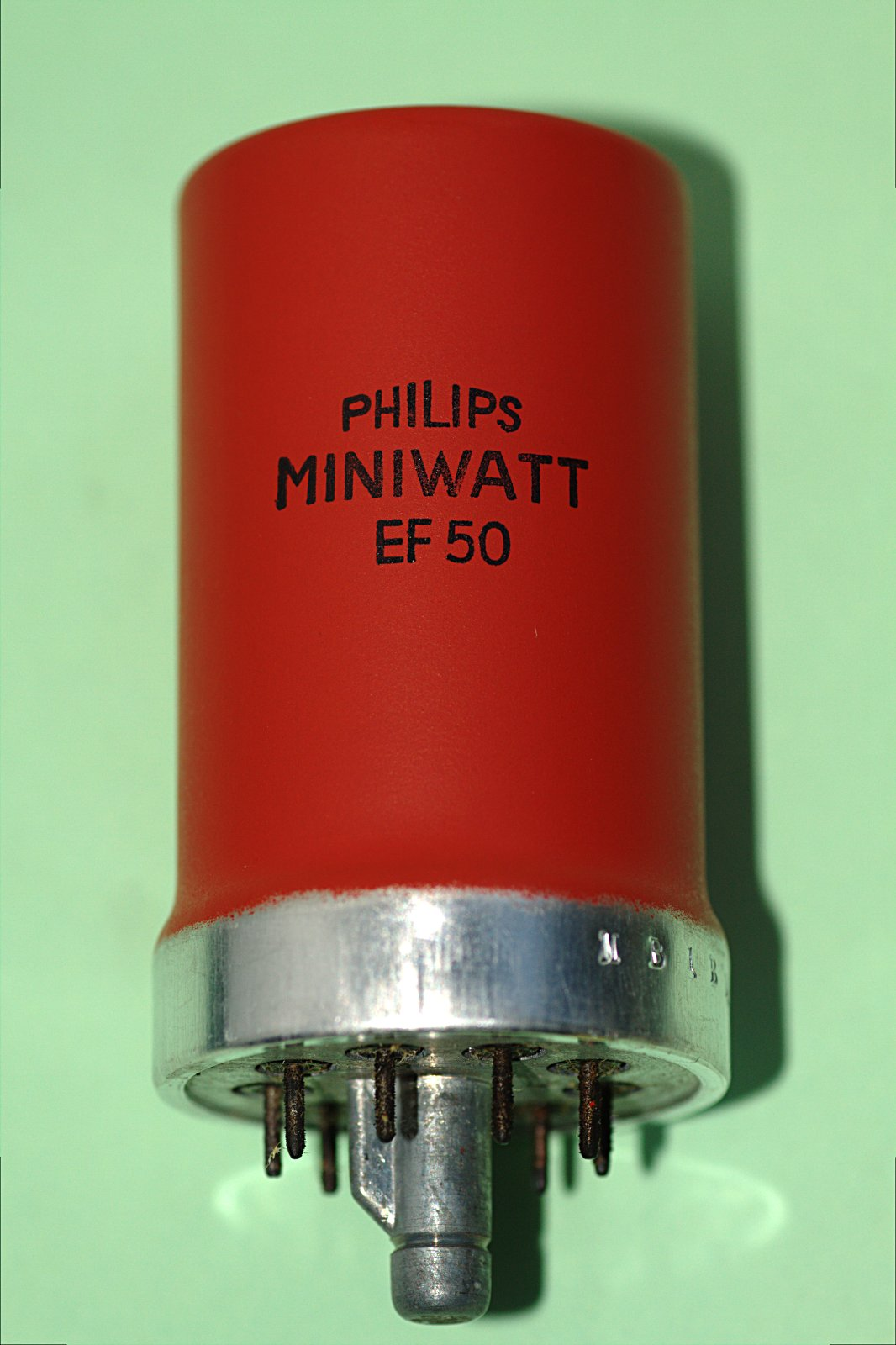
The EF50 made airborne radars practical due to their relatively small size, good frequency response, and good power handling.

AI and ASV developed in parallel for some time. In May 1938 the team received the Western Electric 4304 tubes which replaced the 316As doorknobs in the transmitter and improved transmit power to 2,000 W. In testing this proved to increase detection range on ships to 12 to 15 miles (19–24 km), although in the AI role the range was little improved.

While the transmitter problem was considered solved with the new tubes, the team had significant problems with the receivers. A Metrovick employee had been told to begin building the receivers and asked for an example, but the team had only one airworthy receiver and had to give them an old hand-assembled bench model with the instructions that it wasn't to be used for a production design. Sure enough, Metrovick returned a design based on this model, which proved useless. The team also contacted Cossor and provided complete details of the required design, but when they returned their first attempt six months later it was completely unusable. When they asked for improvements, Cossor never responded, too busy with other work.

While waiting for the Metrovick and Cossor receivers to arrive, there was a chance encounter between Bowen and his former professor at King's College, Nobel prize winner Edward Appleton. In early 1939, Appleton mentioned to Bowen that Pye Electronics had also been interested in the BBC's experimental 45 MHz television service and had built receivers that they still might have on-hand. Bowen visited the company in April or May, and found that they had "scores and scores" of the receivers in a production-ready form. When they tested them, they were found to be far superior to the EMI models.

Much of the improvement in the Pye receiver was due to the use of a new type of tube developed by Philips, the EF50 "Miniwatt", which had been designed specifically for efficient VHF use. The tubes were labeled Mullard, Philip's UK subsidiary. When they investigated, Mullard told the Air Ministry that the tubes were actually built at Philips' factory in Eindhoven, and that attempts to start production in the UK had failed due to problems manufacturing the bases. The bases used a new design that was key to the way the tubes operated.

This led to a hurried effort to start production at the Mullard factories. The destroyer HMS Windsor was sent to the Netherlands to pick up the Philips board of directors, while two cargo ships were sent to pick up 25,000 EF50s, and 25,000 more bases which Mullard could build additional tubes while a new production line was set up. The ships left as the German attack on the Netherlands was proceeding and the docks were under constant threat of air attack.

By the end of July 1939, the team finally had everything in place and an order for twenty-four units was sent out. Metrovick would build the transmitters, Pye was already ramping up production of what became known as the Pye strip receiver, and Pye had also begun experimental production of a cathode ray tube (CRT) that proved suitable for radar use.

=== ASV Mk. I ===
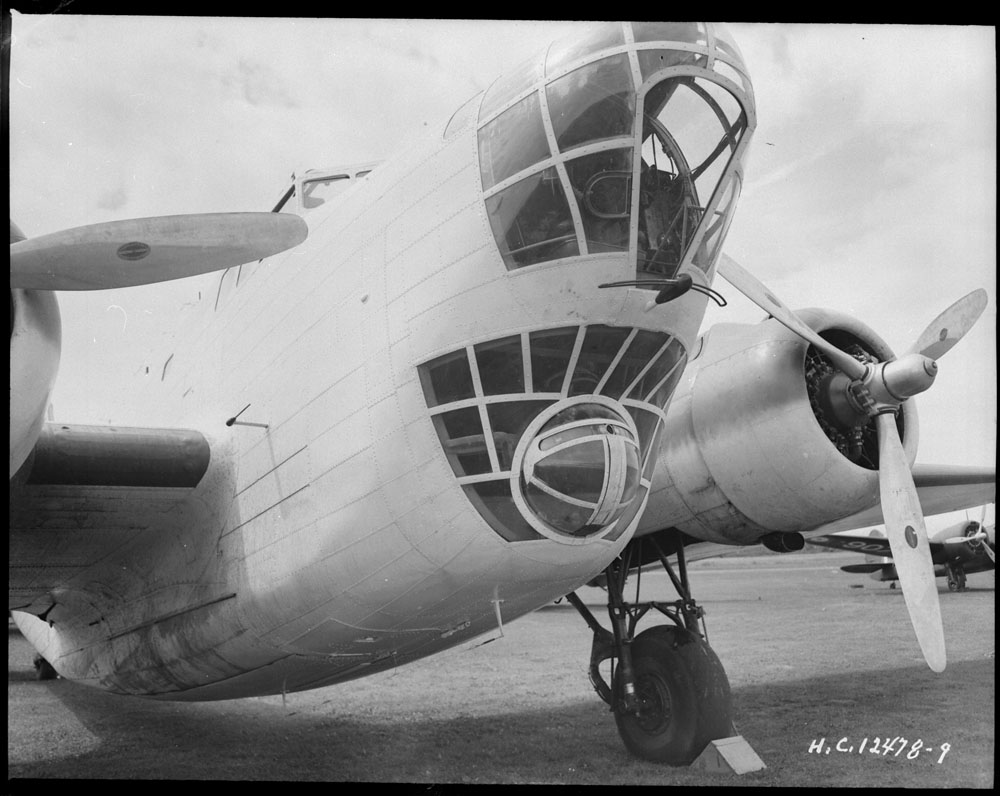
The Mk. I units used an antenna arrangement similar to the Mk. II unit seen on this RCAF Douglas Digby at CFB Rockcliffe. This particular aircraft also carried an experimental high-gain antenna under the wings, which cannot be seen here.

In early August, the team was informed that the Air Ministry had ordered 30 AI units and expected Bowen to have them installed in Bristol Blenheim aircraft within 30 days. When the units started arriving, they found the Metrovick transmitter was also the bench model, and when they protested, Metrovick noted that Watson-Watt had personally visited the factory and told them to put it into production because it was known to work.

To further confuse matters, when the war began on 1 September, the majority of the AMES team was hurriedly sent to a prearranged location at the University of Dundee in Scotland, only to find that nothing had been prepared. The rector had only vague memories of a conversation on the topic with Watson-Watt, and by now the students had returned for the fall term and there was little available room.

Bowen's AI team was sent to a small airfield outside of Perth (some distance from Dundee) that was utterly unsuitable for fitting. Nevertheless, radar sets and aircraft started to arrive, along with new demands from the Fleet Air Arm to equip some of their aircraft with ASV in Swordfish and Walrus aircraft.

At a meeting in London on 30 November 1939, the relative priorities for Chain Home, Chain Home Low, AI and ASV were discussed. Bowen finalized plans to build the ASV radios at EKCO using the new VT90 tubes (later known as CV62) in the transmitter, while the AI Mk. II would use the older DET12 and TY120s. This meant the ASV would be somewhat more advanced than AI.

Another chance encounter after the meeting led Bowen to try a new material, polythene, from Imperial Chemical Industries (ICI) which produced excellent coaxial cable and neatly solved the electrical problems they had been having. It was soon in use throughout the industry.

The first ASV using production parts was hand-fitted to a Walrus and sent to Gosport for testing. This version ran at a nominal 1.5 m wavelength, at 214 MHz. Flying at only 20 feet (6.1 m) over the water, the radar easily detected ships all around the Solent. Louis Mountbatten was watching this performance and immediately ordered one fitted to his destroyer, HMS Kelly. The Navy soon picked up development as the Type 286, and 200 such units would eventually be fitted to destroyers and torpedo boats.

Meanwhile, Bernard Lovell had arrived at Perth, and through contacts in the Air Ministry, managed to convince them that the site was unsuitable for their work. A new location at RAF St. Athan in Wales was selected and the team moved into a hangar on the airfield in November 1939. Conditions turned out to be little better than Perth, and the team was forced to work in freezing temperatures as the hangar doors had to be left open. Nevertheless, by the end of December they had managed to fit 17 AI radars in Blenheims, and 3 ASVs in the newly arriving Coastal Command Lockheed Hudsons. January improved this to 18 AI and 12 ASV, numbers that continued to increase through the year.

=== Early use ===
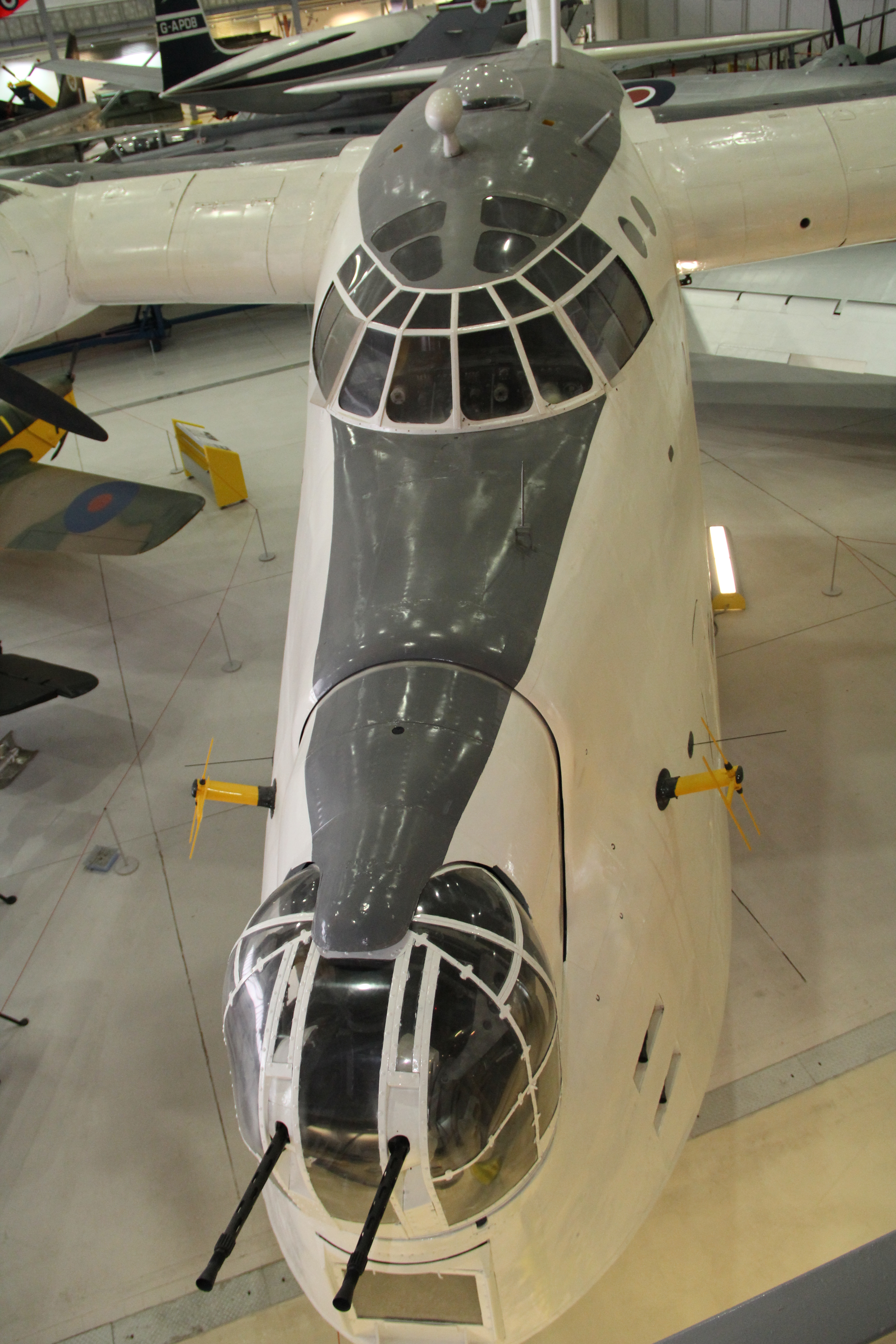
Duxford's Short Sunderland mounts the original short-range antennas, now painted bright yellow. By the time this aircraft left service they were used only as receivers for Lucero and BABS.

By the early part of 1940, Hudsons were arriving at the rate of two or three a week, and the crews were able to quickly fit the sets due to the easy working environment in the large fuselage. At this time, the team was large enough that they were able to send a small group to Pembroke Dock, where No. 10 Squadron RAAF was operating the Short Sunderland. The group was able to quickly fit ASV Mk. I to these aircraft, followed by the Consolidated Catalina that had also just started arriving. Meanwhile, Robert Hanbury Brown and Keith Wood began training the crews on how to best use the systems.

Test flights began in late 1939, and they were used operationally in the first months of 1940. It would be some time before the related AI Mark IV sets became operational in July 1940, making ASV the world's first operational airborne radar system. (Note: The first German airborne sets did not arrive until 1941.) At first the crews found the system relatively useless for attacks, as they could not reliably detect submarines, the only German ships in the area. Testing had shown the maximum detection range on a surfaced submarine was about 5.5 miles (8.9 km), so in a high sea state with the minimum range of 4.5 miles, this left little room for detection. But they did find the sets useful for stationkeeping over the convoys, as well as navigating by looking at the returns from sea cliffs.

But the device became extremely useful after Squadron Leader Sidney Lugg installed an IFF Mark II transponder at the base, tuned to operate on the ASV frequencies. The IFF system broadcast a short pulse of radio signal whenever it heard the pulse from one of the ASV radars, and its signal was so powerful that the crews could pick it up at 50 to 60 miles (80–97 km) from base, making the return flight to RAF Leuchars much less eventful. The crews took to naming the beacon "Mother".

In February 1940 a collection of early combat reports was compiled in order to better understand how to improve the system. By this time the Mk. I had also been installed on Blackburn Botha and Bristol Beaufort aircraft. The reports noted that the system was useful for detecting ships at night or in bad weather, but suffered from the fact that enemy shipping typically hugged the coastline where the returns from the land often swamped the ship's returns. It was also useful for guiding an attack when the cloud cover was below 1,500 feet (460 m), as they could press an attack without ever being seen.

=== ASV Mk. II ===
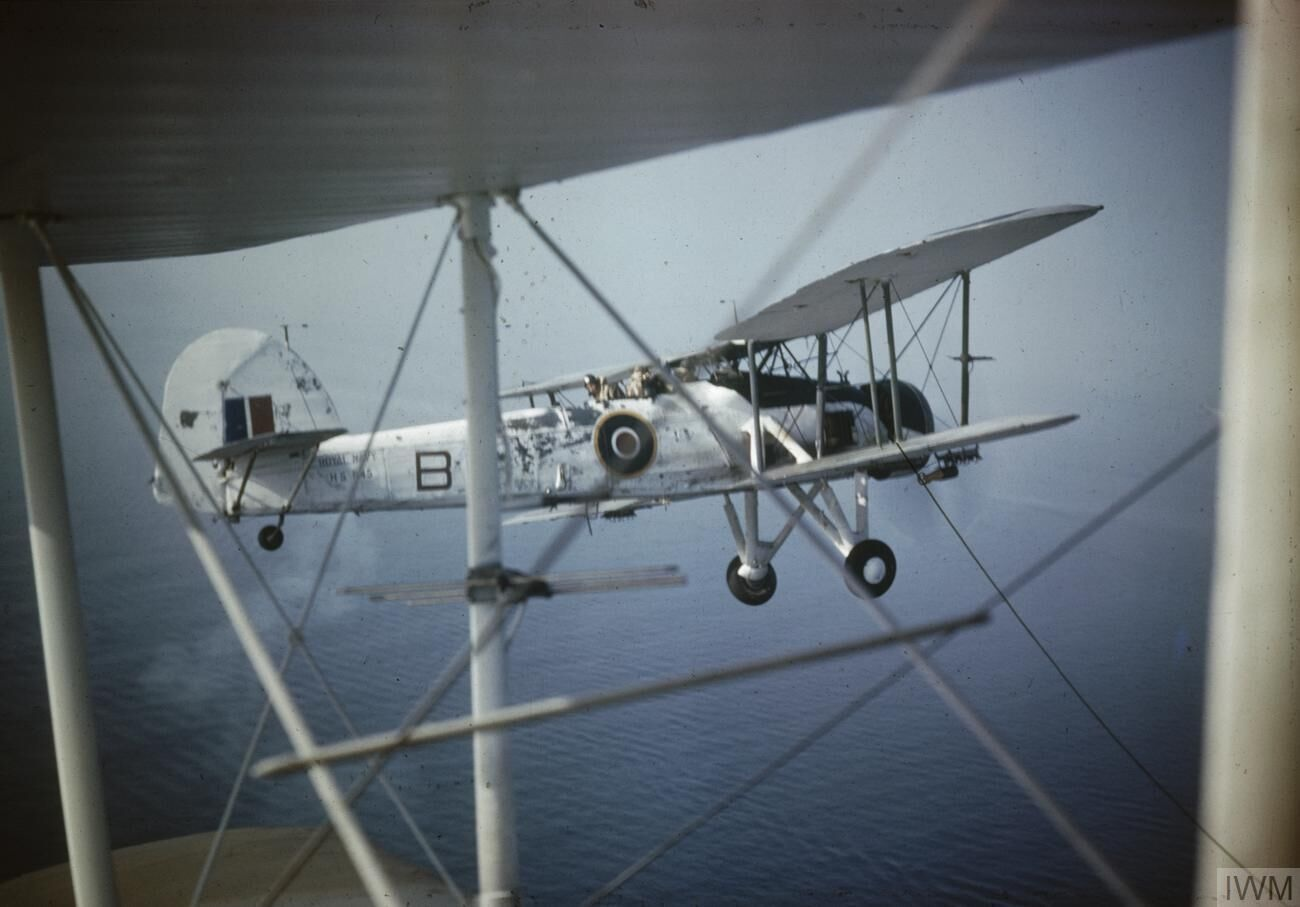
Compact Yagis were mounted to the wing struts on the Fairey Swordfish. A system like this one was responsible for detecting, and ultimately sinking, the Bismarck.

Based on the experiences of the Mk. I units in the field, in January 1940 Gerald Touch began designing a new set while working at the RAE. Hanbury Brown joined him in February 1940.

The new ASV Mk. II design was essentially a rationalized and cleaned up Mk. I, differing little in terms of the electronics, but considerably in terms of layout, wiring and construction. Among the changes was the separation of the receiver electronics from the display so either could be fixed by swapping them out separately, and using a selection of standard electrical connectors on all of the cables.

As a result, Mk. II was far more reliable than Mk. I; it did not offer increased performance, but maintained that performance in spite of rough service and was much easier to fix in the field. The only other major change was to move the operational frequency from 214 MHz to 176 MHz because it was found the Mk. Is were interfering with naval radio beacons.

An order for 4,000 units was placed with EKCO and Pye. For reasons unknown, the contract negotiations required considerable time to finalize, and throughout the production run it battled for precedence with the AI units and Chain Home Low which also made use of the Pye strip. The first Mk. II units began to arrive in the summer of 1940, and by October 1940, 140 transmitters, 45 receivers and 80 displays had been delivered. By the end of March 1941 that had increased to 2,000 transmitters and 1,000 receivers.

Mk. II scored its first success on 30 November 1940 when a Whitley Mk. VI damaged U-71 in the Bay of Biscay. (Note: U-71 was launched on 31 October 1940 and spent some time in the Kiel area. This leaves little time for it to move to Biscay before it was attacked. Further verification would be useful.) On 26 May 1941, a Fairey Swordfish equipped with Mk. II detected the Bismarck as it attempted to return to France for repairs. This detection led to the Bismark's sinking the next day. By mid-1941 the ASV radar had increased daytime attacks on U-boats by 20%, and made night attacks possible for the first time. The first successful night attack on a U-boat was carried out by a Swordfish on 21 December 1941.

=== Long-Range ASV ===
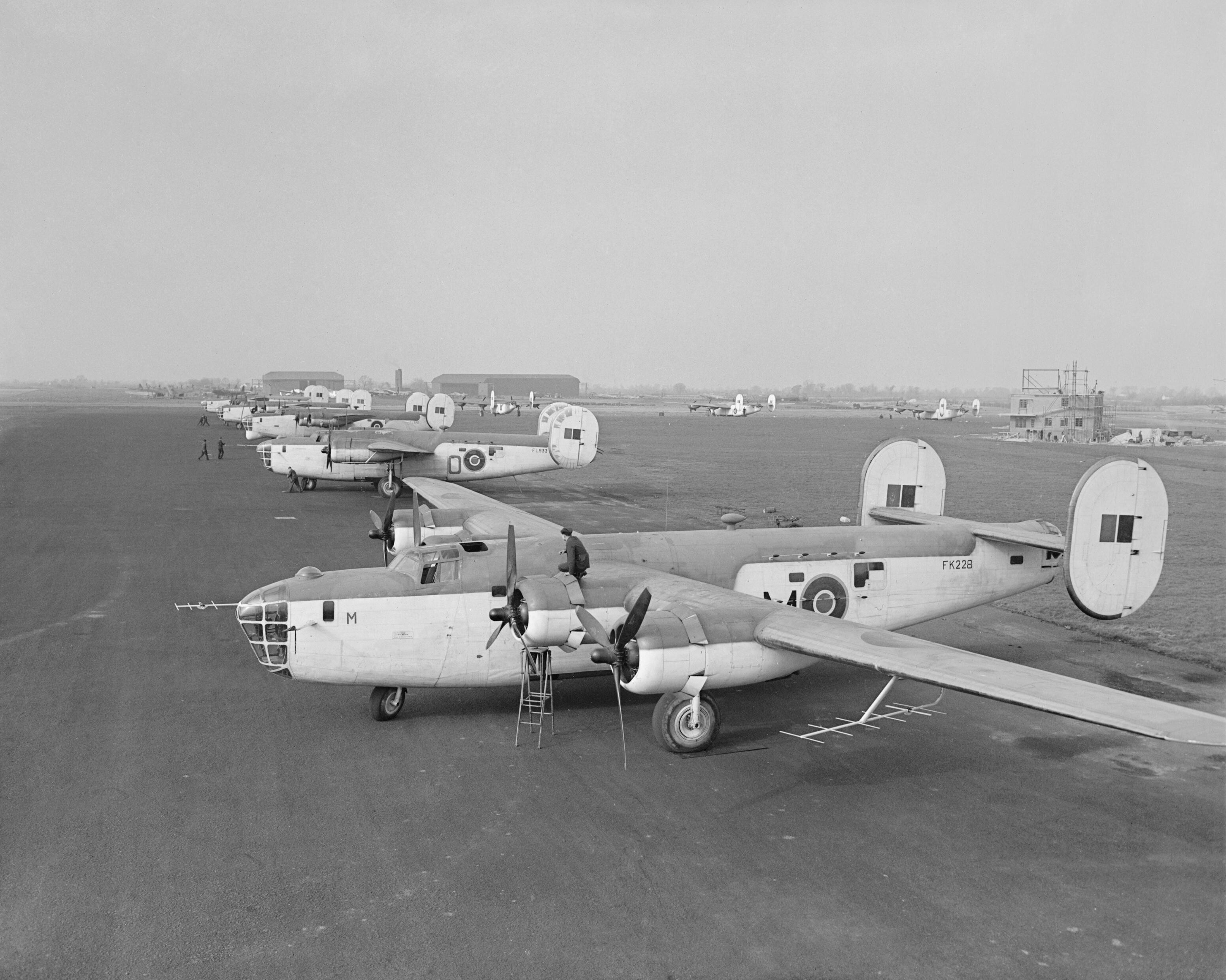
This Coastal Command Liberator mounts both sets of LRASV antennas. On the nose and under the wings are the Yagi arrays for forward-search, and the port broadside array can be seen just about the roundel on the side of the fuselage. The aircraft two away is equipped with ASV Mk. III.

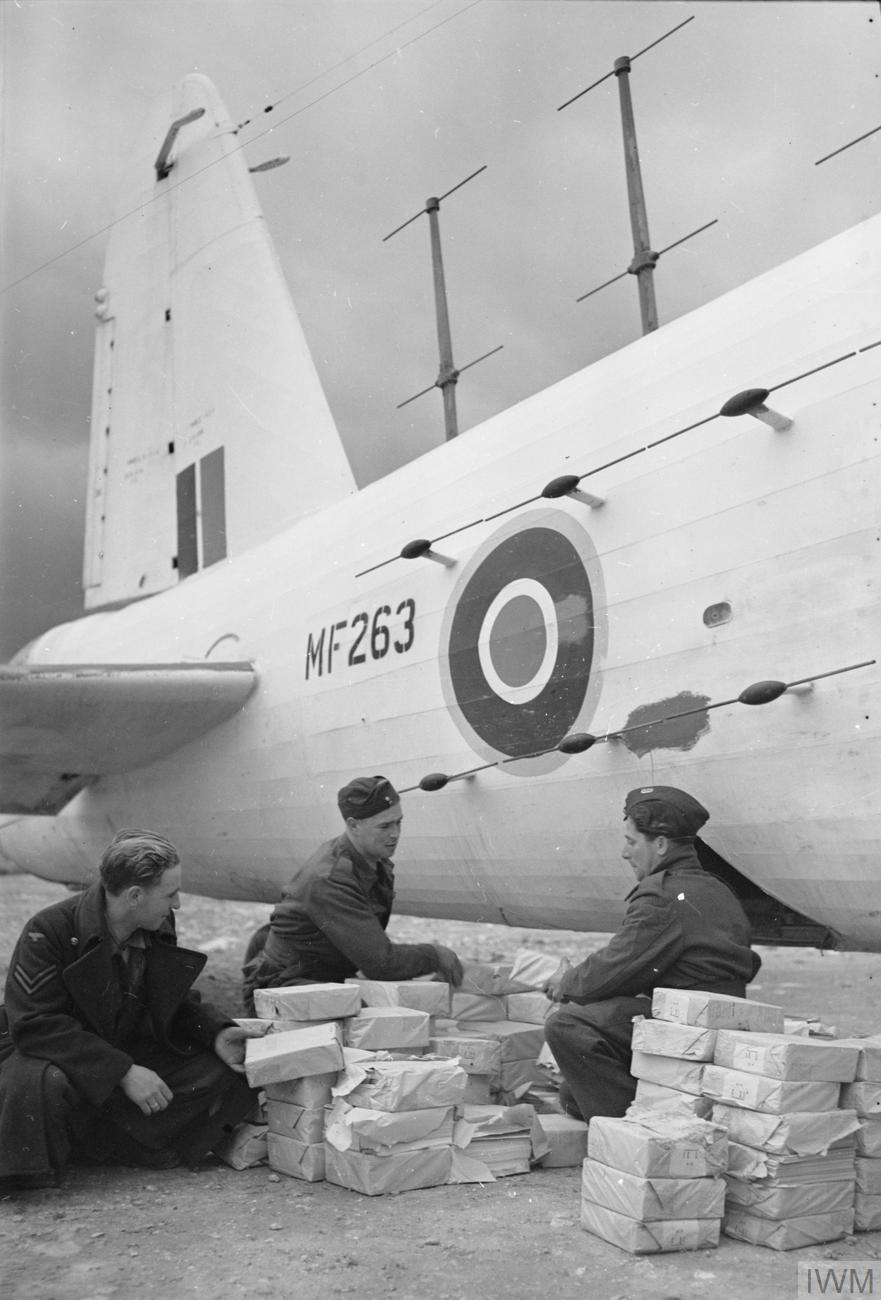
On the Wellington, the broadside array shared a common transmit array spread along the top of the fuselage.

ASV had not been designed to detect submarines, but late 1939 testing by Hudsons of No. 220 Squadron RAF against HMS L27 showed that it was possible to pick up surfaced submarines at limited range and in low sea states.

Experiments demonstrated that the main problem causing short range was the low gain of the antennas. Given the low speeds of the aircraft, so that drag was not a significant issue compared to the AI role, the team was able to use Yagi antennas with much higher gain. Typical installations had the transmitter on the front of the nose, and two receivers under the wings, pointed outward at their half-power point, typically 22.5 degrees. Named Long-Range ASV, or LRASV for short, the new antennas became available for fitting in 1940.

Shortly after moving to St. Athan in 1939, Hanbury Brown received a request to fit ASV to the Armstrong Whitworth Whitley bomber, which was no longer competitive and was being passed off to other uses. Brown took the chance to develop a new antenna, a type of Sterba array, that stretched along both sides of the flat rear fuselage, firing to the side instead of forward. This "broadside array" allowed the aircraft to search wide areas of the ocean on both sides of the aircraft at the same time, a great improvement over the forward-only design.

The broadside array offered about 2.5 times the gain of the original system. This allowed it to detect moderate-sized ships at 40 miles (64 km) and surfaced submarines at 10 to 15 miles (16–24 km), an enormous advance over the Mk. I style antennas. The aircraft could scan the approaches to a convoy by flying 10 miles to one side of it, sweeping a 20-mile wide path. Submarines were not fast enough to cross that distance before the aircraft had returned for another sweep. There was some discussion of giving it a special display to make interpretation easier, but it went into service using the original ASV display instead.

=== Tizard mission ===
In early 1940 there was a lengthy debate within the Air Ministry, and the government in general, about whether or not the United States should be told of the many technological developments taking place in the UK. The UK was suffering from a lack of manpower and production capacity, problems the US could easily solve. They also hoped to gain access to the Norden bombsight, which was several years ahead of their version, the Automatic Bomb Sight. However, the radar concepts were believed to be among some of the most advanced in the world, and giving them to the US would mean surrendering some of the UK's best ideas to exploitation by what was then still a non-aligned party.

Ultimately, Winston Churchill personally overrode any remaining objections, and tasked Henry Tizard with making the arrangements. After considering the many technologies being developed, Tizard's team ultimately chose four to take with them; AI Mk. IV, ASV Mk. II, IFF Mark II, and the new cavity magnetron that made radars much smaller and more powerful. They were also aware of and allowed to speak about other technologies, including the jet engine and the initial concepts of the nuclear bomb detailed by the MAUD Committee.

For various reasons, the mission team first travelled to Canada where they met with members of the National Research Council Canada (NRC) in Ottawa. Here they were surprised to learn that in September 1939 the NRC had started working on an ASV radar using an adapted radio altimeter built by Westinghouse Electric in the US. This set worked on the relatively short wavelength of 67 cm, about half that of the British 1.5 m set. A prototype was working by November and was making some progress.

The Tizard mission was in Ottawa for only two days before leaving for Washington. During that time the NRC radio teams pored over the ASV unit, trying to learn everything they could of its design before it left for the US. This led to a debate on whether to continue development of their own system, whose shorter wavelength would make it more suitable for aircraft use, or to simply build the British unit using Canadian and US tubes.

The Mission's arrival in Washington initially led to similar surprises when the team learned that the US Army and Navy had developed radars similar to the British Chain Home and Chain Home Low. However, the US Navy complained that it would be much better if radars worked at microwave frequencies and explained their frustration that existing microwave devices had power of only a few watts. Bowen reached into his lock box and produced cavity magnetron number 6. This device produced pulses of about 10 kW, hundreds of times more than US devices, and newer models were soon producing ten times that amount.

This event broke the ice, and soon the two teams were planning a complete development and production schedule for all of the British designs. It was eventually agreed that US companies would begin producing the ASV and AI 1.5 m sets while beginning research on new radars using the magnetron. Ultimately, the countries' parties agreed that Research Enterprises Limited (REL) in Toronto would build the British ASV unit as-is, building a new factory for its construction. Several thousand units were ultimately produced, mostly sold to the US.

=== Leigh light ===
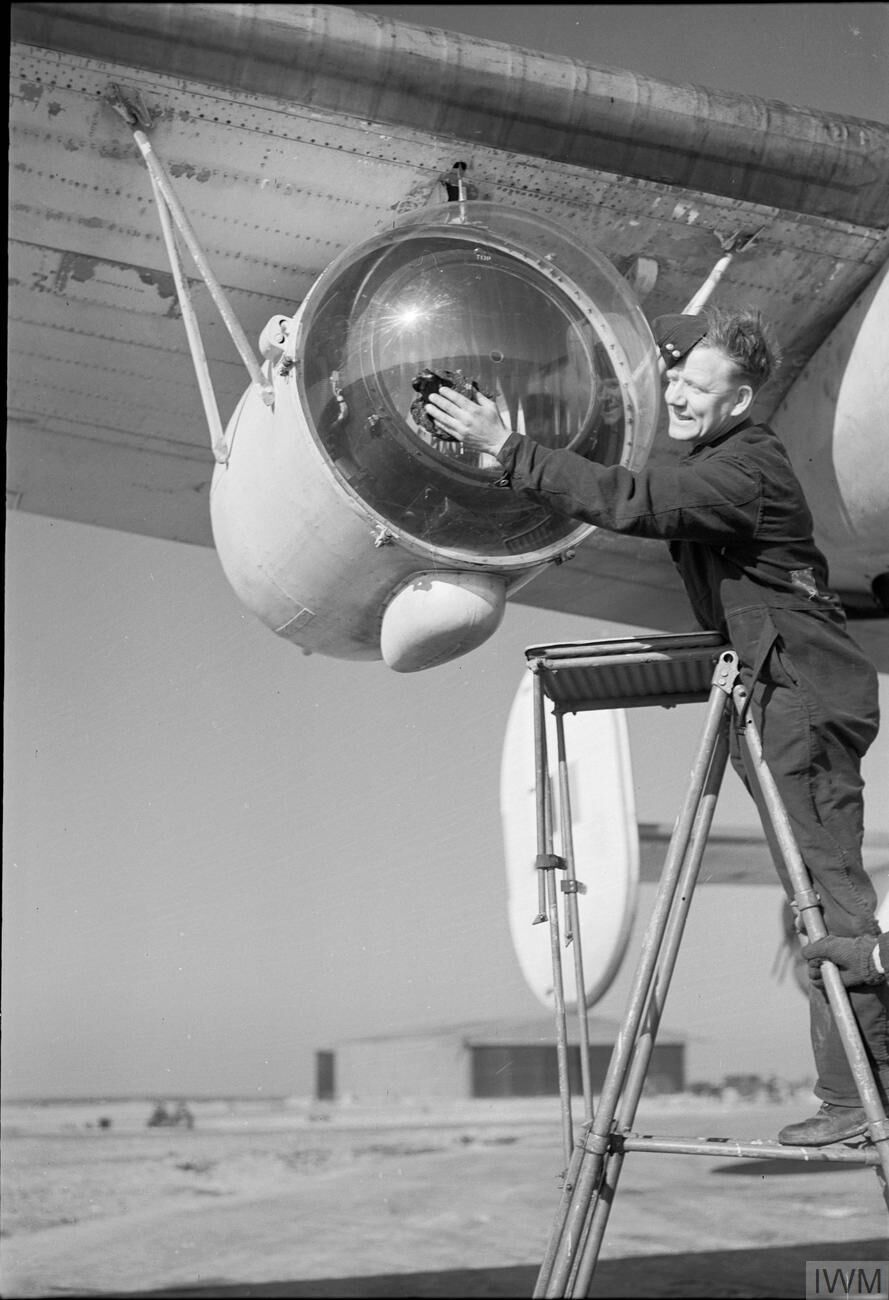
A crewman cleans the Leigh Light mounted under the starboard wing of an RAF Coastal Command Liberator GR Mk V. The light could be aimed to point at the target without having to point the aircraft directly at it.

In spite of the system's ability to detect submarines at night, attacking them was not a simple matter. After finding the rough location on the broadside array, the target was plotted on a map and the aircraft maneuvered so it could begin to approach it using the forward-facing antennas. These had less gain and picked up the submarine at shorter ranges, so there was a possibility the submarine could escape as they switched from side to forward approach.

But the real problem was that the minimum range of the radar was about 1000 yards at best; at shorter distances the returns from the target merged with the leftover signal from the transmitter and became invisible in the electronic noise and scattering off the water. Unfortunately, 1,000 yards was too long a range for the submarine to be spotted visually at night except under perfect conditions, like a full moon. The same problem affected the AI radars as well, but in that case was far more serious due to the small size of the aircraft targets compared to a U-boat or ship, and the team had invested considerable effort in trying to solve this "minimum range controversy", so far unsuccessfully.

While this work continued, a new solution was introduced. Humphrey de Verd Leigh, an RAF personnel officer, came up with the idea after talking to returning aircrew and learning of the short-range cutoff problem. He built a searchlight into a streamlined container with a lens that spread the beam so it covered an area several degrees wide at a range of 1,000 yards (910 m), about the same angle as the beam of the radar. It would be turned on just as the signal disappeared on the radar screen, lighting the target and allowing the last seconds of the approach to be carried out visually.

In March 1941 they began trying to fit it to a Vickers Wellington, and after some effort it was flown successfully. Although the Air Ministry was convinced the idea was workable, they decided to re-use an older searchlight design known as the Turbinlite, which was originally intended to be used in a similar role for night fighters. This was not nearly as powerful as Leigh's version, but was smaller and already available in some numbers. In spite of great effort, the Turbinlite never worked satisfactorily. It was not until late in 1941 before the Ministry admitted this and returned to de Leigh's original design. He had continued to develop it in secret during this time.

The first examples of the Leigh light started appearing in the early summer of 1942. The first success was on 5 July 1942 when a Wellington of No. 172 Squadron RAF sank U-502. From that point on, the combination of ASV Mk. II and Leigh light proved extremely effective. So many submarines were being attacked by the end of the summer that leaving base at night, formerly entirely safe, was now considered suicidal. The Germans were forced to leave their bases during the day so they could at least see the attacking aircraft and put up a fight, but this proved little safer.

=== Metox ===
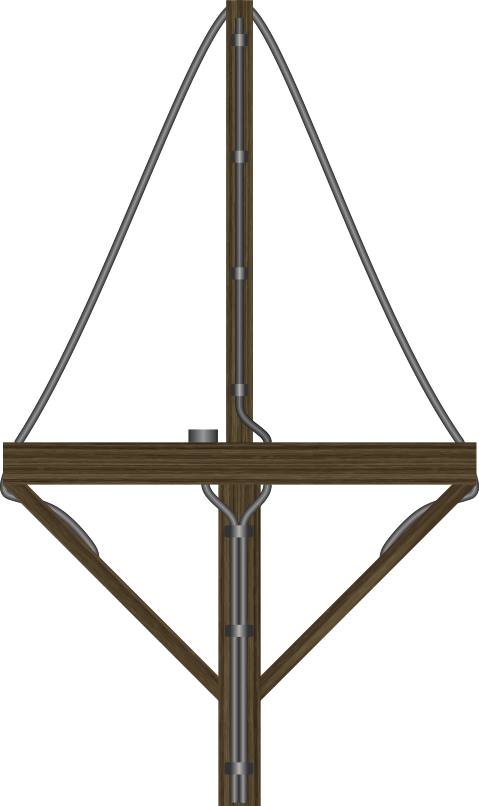
The Metox detector was a simple affair, consisting of a cross-shaped antenna that was swung by hand, and a radio receiver inside the submarine. Coastal Command pilots who saw the new antenna nicknamed it the "Biscay Cross".

While Mk. II was in the midst of achieving some of its greatest successes, in the late summer of 1942 crews returned to base claiming that good detections on German U-boats were followed by the ships disappearing as they moved in for the approach. It was quickly surmised that the Germans were fitting a radar detector to their boats and diving when they saw an aircraft approaching. This possibility had been considered in October 1941, but at the time there seemed to be no reason to stop using ASV.

The detector, known as "Metox" after the Paris-based company that produced them, was a simple system. When a pulse on the correct frequency was received, it sent out a short pulse of audio in the radio operator's headphones. The operator could listen for the strength and pattern of the signals to determine if the aircraft was approaching. (Note: It is stated that the operator would look for changes in the pulse repetition frequency, but existing references suggest ASV did not have this feature. It is more likely this refers to the change when the aircraft switched from the broadside array to the forward-looking antennas, as this would double the number of pulses painting the submarine as long as it was roughly in front of the aircraft and visible to both antennas. This would indicate the aircraft is now approaching rather than simply scanning the area.)

Studying the statistics of attacks during 1942 in the Bay of Biscay, the RAF was able to determine that the system had first been introduced in June and had become largely universal by September. By comparing the distance at which the submarine was detected and then when it was lost, they calculated that as many as 50% of the U-boats were diving before the ASV even saw them. What was once dismissed as a minor issue was now clearly a significant problem. For the first time since the introduction of ASV, shipping losses once again began to rise.

The effects were summarized in an early-1943 study. They showed that before the introduction of Metox, an aircraft without radar would spend 135 hours in the air for every U-boat it detected, while one equipped with ASV saw one for every 95 hours of flight. From October, when Metox was common, it took ASV aircraft 135 hours, meaning Metox had seemingly rendered ASV useless. However, the time taken to find a U-boat without radar had also increased, to 245 hours, so ASV was still useful.

A brief reprieve in the effects of Metox was at hand in December 1942, when British codebreakers once again were able to break into the Naval Enigma and U-boat losses began to climb again due to intercepts revealing their positions and orders. This was combined with a key piece of false information planted by a captured British officer, who claimed their aircraft were equipped with a device to listen for the very weak signals given off by the Metox's intermediate frequency stage. This led to early 1943 orders from German Naval High Command to turn off the Metox, which allowed Mk. II to once again become effective for a time.

=== Mk IIA ===
Another attempt to improve the performance of the system was the introduction of a new transmitter, T.3140. This produced over ten times the signal, averaging 100 kW per pulse, and thereby increased the overall range and performance. This required a more powerful alternator and the transmitter assembly was twice the weight of the original T.3040.

The system was installed on six Sunderlands, under the name Mark IIA, in the spring of 1943. While the system did demonstrate much greater range, it was found that the sea return off waves was also much more powerful. By this point Metox was universal, and the extra signal gave the U-boats significant additional warning time. The system was ultimately built to the extent of only twelve units.

=== Vixen ===
Another solution to the Metox problem was implemented in the "Vixen" system. This allowed the strength of the signal from the ASV's transmitter to be muted down. By timing this process carefully, the radar operator could fool the radio operator on the submarine into thinking the aircraft was flying away from them. This had little effect on the performance of the radar as it approached the target, as even with less signal being broadcast the reduction in range more than made up for any loss of power from the muting.

The first tests of Vixen were carried out in June 1943 and were generally successful, with some issues. The main one was that the muting was created by a shorted antenna, and as it was adjusted it caused the loading on the transmitter to change, which led to changes in the output signal. These were ultimately not considered important, and it was suggested it be fit on all ASV aircraft. However, production was not ordered until November 1943 and the first sets did not arrive until February 1944, by which point ASV Mk. III had largely taken over. Vixen was not used operationally.

=== ASV Mk. III ===
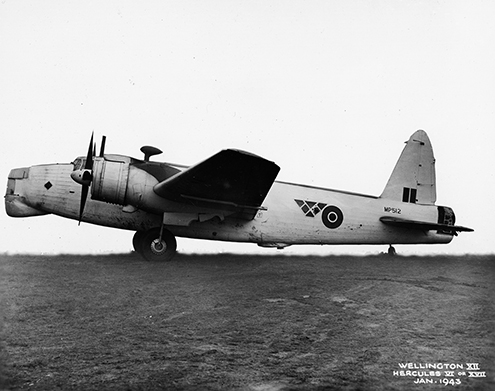
One of the first fits of ASV Mk. III was on this Vickers Wellington XII MP512 in January 1943.

After the invention of the cavity magnetron in early 1940, all of the British forces began development of radars using the system, which generated microwaves at around 10 cm wavelength. Among these were the Air Ministry teams who had developed both AI and ASV, and had now turned their attention to AIS and ASVS, the S standing for "senitmetric". Tests in April 1941 with early lash-up devices against HMS Sealion showed they could detect semi-submerged submarine at several miles range.

In June 1941 a formal application to the Director of Communications Development (DCD, at that time run by Robert Watt) to form a separate group to develop ASVS was approved, but development was slow. Philip Dee noted that the first flight in a Wellington did not take place until December, and it was not until January 1942 that he noted "ASV saw [the small ship] Titlark at 12 miles". This led to contracts with Ferranti and Metropolitan Vickers (Metrovick) to develop the lash-up ASVS into a useful airborne system as ASV Mark III. They had a suitable system ready by the summer of 1942, although the first deliveries would not be available before the spring of 1943.

Throughout this period, Hanbury Brown was convinced the H2S could also be used for anti-shipping work, with suitable modifications. The primary issues were reducing the size of the antenna to fit in Coastal Command's smaller aircraft, and modifications to the antenna to send the signal further forward rather than down, in keeping with an aircraft flying at 2,000 feet (610 m) rather than 20,000 feet (6.1 km) altitude. He continued working on this project with the primary developers of H2S, EMI. In late 1942, the ASVS version of Mark III was cancelled and the H2S-based version was ordered into production.

After significant confusion and argument between Coastal and Bomber Command, the ASV Mk. III began to arrive in the spring of 1943, and after some rather disappointing sorties in March, the Wellingtons began making successful attacks late that month. This was the same period in which several new anti-submarine technologies were arriving, and from April through July these combined to result in a huge number of losses to the U-boat fleet. By the end of June, cargo shipping losses to U-boat attacks had dropped almost to zero.

As supplies of the Mk. III improved, Mk. II-equipped aircraft were sent to secondary theaters where they served out the war. Examples with the original dipole antennas were in service as late as 1943, by which time they were known as SRASV, for "Short Range".

== Description ==
=== Differences in the Mk. I ===
The Mk. I and Mk. II units were generally similar electronically but differed in their operating frequency and packaging. The main difference was that the Mk. I receiver and display were packaged in a single large box, which meant the entire unit had to be replaced if there was a problem with either part. The signals were also slightly different, with the Mk. I producing the same 7 kW power, but with a pulse width of 1.5 μS and a PRF of 1200 Hz.

The rest of this section concerns the Mk. II.

=== Signals ===
The Mk. II operated on a frequency of 176 MHz ±5 MHz. It sent out pulses about 2.5 μS long 400 times a second. The peak power was about 7 kW. The signals were sent through a rotating switch that alternated with each pulse, sending and receiving the signal on either side of the aircraft. The signals returned through the Pye strip amplifier, and every other pulse was electrically inverted.

=== Antennas ===
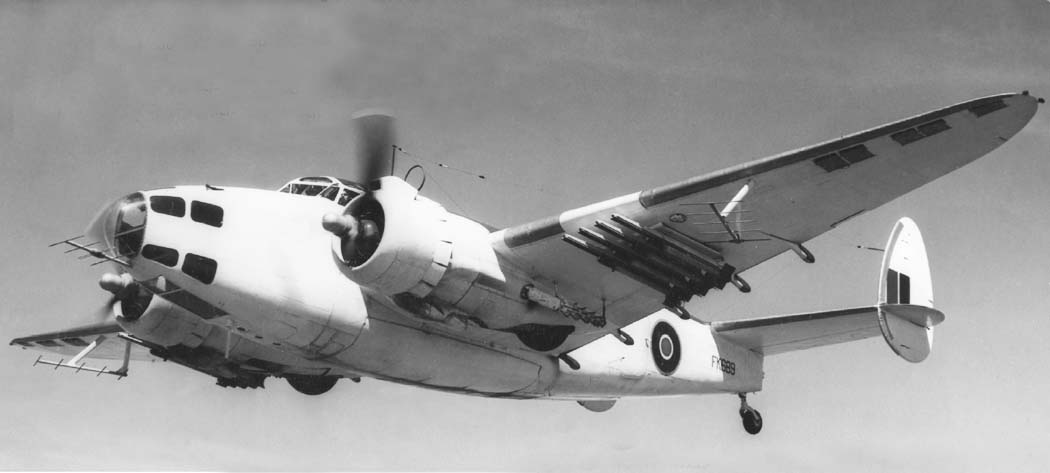
This Hudson is equipped forward-firing LRASV antennas, with the transmitter on the nose and the receivers under each wing, angled outboard.

The original "short range" antennas consisted of receiver unipoles extending horizontally out from either side of the nose of the aircraft. Behind them were the transmitters, which was a similar unipole but also included a reflector behind it.

The "long range" antennas were in two sets. The transmitter was a single Yagi extending from the nose, and two receiver Yagis, typically under the wings, angled outboard at about 15 degrees. The broadside array was normally arranged with a Sterba curtain running back along the top of the aircraft's fuselage, with sets of dipoles running down the sides of the fuselage.

=== Mechanical ===
The complete system consisted of several separate boxes that could be easily removed for servicing. The main boxes where the Type 3040 (T.3040) transmitter, built by EKCO, the receiver, built by Pye or EKCO, and the Type 6 or Type 96 "indicator units", the CRTs.

Two receivers were used, the first was the R.3039 using VR95 acorn valves, and the later R.3084 using VR136 pentodes and VR137 triodes. Both Pye and EKCO built both versions, and there were a number of minor differences. EKCO's included an output for a recorder and several other changes.

Later, a switching unit was introduced, the Aerial Coupling Box Type 8, which allowed a single antenna to be switched from transmitter to receiver. This was used on smaller aircraft like the Fairey Barracuda, reducing the complexity of the installation.

=== Displays and interpretation ===
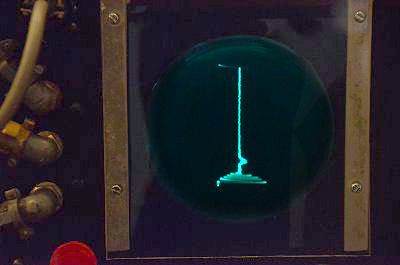
This display simulates a typical scene on the ASV Mk. II. At the bottom is a large triangular blip caused by the transmitter signal and the local ground return. Above that is a smaller blip indicating a target at about nine miles range and to the right of the aircraft.

The receiver's output was sent to an A-scope display with the time base generator pulling the beam vertically from the bottom to the top of the screen. Received signals would deflect the beam to the left or right depending which antenna was active at that time. The operator compared the length of the blip on either side to determine which looked larger, and then used the intercom system to tell the pilot to correct in the right direction.

There was considerable desire to allow the system to have a second display in front of the pilot, so they could navigate directly without verbal instructions from the radar operator. However, in spite of considerable effort from 1940 through 1943, they were unable to make a version that could be seen by the pilot during the day while also not blinding them at night. Eventually, they gave up on the idea in favour of training the operators to give standardized instructions.

=== Performance ===
The combat history of the Mk. II was extensively studied and detailed statistics were collected on its performance. In operational conditions against surfaced submarines, the original SRASV antennas averaged 5.6 miles (9.0 km) range when flying at 2000 feet. The LRASV's forward antennas improved to this 6.3 miles (10.1 km) while the broadside array further increased this to 6.9 miles (11.1 km). It was found that flying at lower altitudes reduced the detection range, but also the amount of clutter.

== Production ==
According to Bowen, production of the Mk. I and II amounted to 24,600 units:

Ordered	Company	Version	Total
1939	EKCO and Pye	Mark I	300
1940	EKCO and Pye	Mark II	3000
1941	EKCO and Pye	Mark II	3000
	Research Enterprises (Canada)	Mark II	10,000
	Philco (USA)	Mark II	7,000
	PMG Research (Australia)	Mark II	1,300

Some of these units were re-directed to the Navy as the Type 286 and to the Army as the basis for their Searchlight Control radars.

== Other materials ==
- Long Range Air-Surface Vessel (Radar) R3, RAF training film on the LRASV
- Air to Surface Vessels (ASV) radar, RAF introduction to ASV
- ACD 2005; Manual of ASV Mk. II (AUST), Royal Australian Air Force ASV operator's manual
