= Japanese commerce raiders Aikoku Maru and Hōkoku Maru =

Japanese armed merchant raiders in World War II.

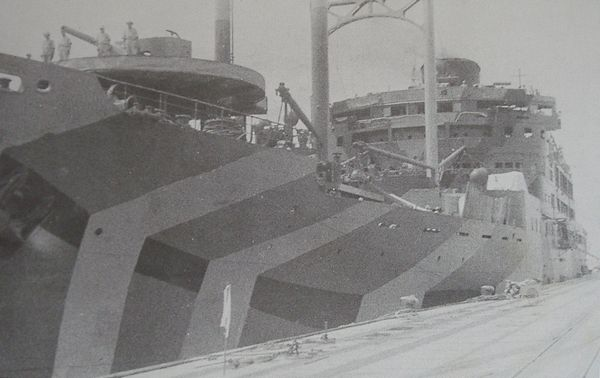
Hōkoku Maru at Penang in May 1942.

The Japanese raiders in the Indian Ocean were vessels of the Imperial Japanese Navy (IJN) during the Second World War for commerce raiding against Allied ships. Possessing a powerful fleet of warships, prior to the start of the war, the IJN had planned to fight a war of fleet actions and delegated few resources to raiding merchant vessels. In 1940, two passenger-cargo vessels, Aikoku Maru and Hōkoku Maru of the Osaka Shipping Line were requisitioned for conversion to armed merchant cruisers (AMC)s.

The vessels were used as merchant raiders, attacking Allied commercial shipping along the sea lanes between Australia and the Middle East. Using their comprehensive armament and speed, the raiders experienced a brief period of success. Japanese raiding in the Indian Ocean largely ceased by the end of 1942 after an action with a Dutch vessel, Ondina and a Royal Indian Navy corvette, HMIS Bengal in which Hōkoku Maru was sunk.

== Background ==
Nations fighting Britain during both world wars in the 20th century made a substantial effort to the disruption of oceanic trade as a means of weakening the British Empire. In late 1942, Axis activities in the Indian Ocean had virtually come to an end. German merchant raiders, attacking ships in these waters, had with few exceptions, been destroyed by the Royal Navy or begun the long journey home. The Imperial Japanese Navy (IJN) had planned a war of fleet actions (guerre d'escadre) and delegated few resources to raiding merchant vessels (guerre de course). After the Indian Ocean raid against Ceylon in April 1942, the Japanese Navy decided to keep the pressure on the shipping lanes, primarily due to the Allies' ever-growing logistical strength in the war. Large and valuable tankers transported oil and other products from the Middle East to Australia and surrounding islands. Requests by the Germans might have had some effect, as the Indian Ocean was the only area of operations in which the two Axis powers had a physical connexion.

== Japanese merchant raiders ==
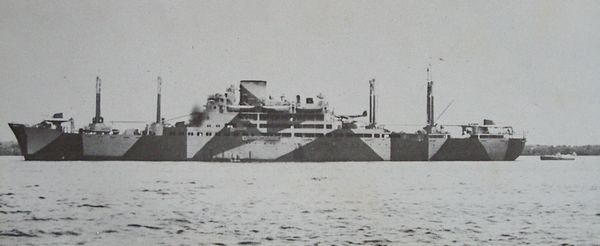
Japanese auxiliary cruiser Aikoku Maru, 1942

In 1940, two passenger-cargo vessels of the Osaka Shipping Line were requisitioned for conversion to armed merchant cruisers (AMC)s, in anticipation of the likely thrust southward by the Japanese. Hōkoku Maru (Captain Hiroshi Imazato) of 10,439 gross register ton (GRT) (the name ship of the class) and Aikoku Maru (Captain Tamotsu Oishi) 10,437 GRT, both under construction for the route between the Empire of Japan and South America, started their rebuilds in 1941 and were powerfully-armed. The main armament consisted of eight 140 mm/50 calibre guns, two 80 mm guns and four 25 mm guns. There were four 533 mm torpedo tubes in twin mounts, and each vessel had two Mitsubishi F1M2 "Pete" Type 0 observation seaplanes, each armed with two fixed forward firing Type 97 machine guns, one flexibly mounted rearward-firing Type 92 machine gun and 120 kg (260 lb) of bombs.

== Sorties ==
=== First voyage ===
With their heavy armament, the two Japanese merchant raiders could overpower any smaller combatant or merchant vessel, and their speed enabled them (in combination with their floatplanes) to search large areas of ocean. In service, they were organized as the 24th Special Cruiser Squadron under Rear-Admiral Moriharu Takeda. Hōkoku Maru was modified to serve as Admiral Takeda's flagship with space for his staff of four officers and eighteen men. The squadron departed Hiroshima Bay on 15 November 1941 under radio silence and blacked out at night to arrive in a standby position at Jaluit Atoll in the Marshall Islands. They departed Jaluit on 26 November 1941 to patrol the sea lanes between Australia, Samoa, Fiji, the United States and the Panama Canal. The plan was for one ship to lie-to and drift while performing maintenance, as the other ship carried out a perimeter patrol searching for enemy shipping. The two ships would spend the hours of darkness in visual range; the ships then reversed roles the following day. Following the Attack on Pearl Harbor, the search objective changed from avoiding detection to locating Allied commerce. Following sunset on 12 December 1941, Hōkoku Maru stopped the 6,210 GRT United States freighter Vincent bound for the Panama Canal from Sydney, Australia at 25°41′S, 118°19′W. The old freighter was sunk after taking her crew of 36 aboard the two raiders. The Japanese ships then left the area to avoid any response to Vincent's radio SOS.

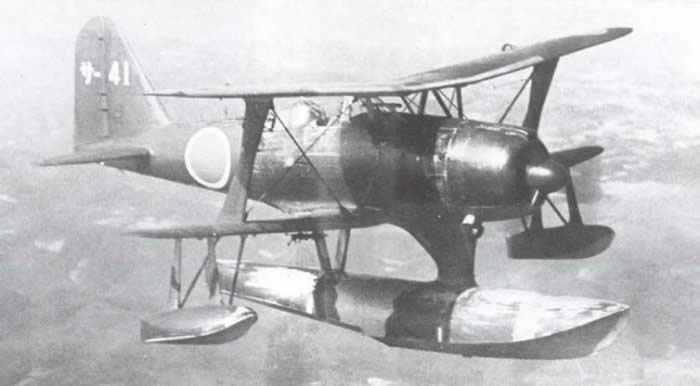
Mitsubishi F1M seaplane

On 31 December, a seaplane from Aikoku Maru found the US freighter Malama (3,275 GRT) bound for New Zealand from Honolulu with of US Army Air Force trucks and aircraft engines. The seaplane was seen on Malama but failed to return to Aikoku Maru. The squadron began a search for the seaplane at 18:10, more aircraft taking off at 07:00 on 1 January 1942 to expand the search. One of the seaplanes found Malama at 09:10, circled at low altitude and ordered the ship to stop with machine-gun fire. Malama broadcast distress messages until 14:15; Takeda intercepted the calls and called the aircraft back to be rearmed with bombs. Malama was bombed, set on fire and scuttled by her crew at 26°39′S, 151°24′W, the 38 crew being taken prisoner. Between 16 and 20 January the squadron intercepted loud radio signals suggesting that Allied warships were nearby, evaded detection and replenished at Truk on 4 February 1942, transferring the prisoners to the Oita Bay Naval Air Command on 13 February.

=== Second voyage ===
The Mozambique Channel, between Madagascar (in green) and east Africa

In April 1942 five Japanese submarines, with Aikoku Maru and Hōkoku Maru acting as supply ships, departed Penang for operations the Mozambique Channel that is about 250 nmi × 500 nmi (460 km × 930 km; 290 mi × 580 mi) in the western Indian Ocean. (Note: The Japanese submarines I-10, I-16 and I-18; I-30 accompanied the voyage but was bound for Lorient with cargo.) The shortage of escort vessels made it impossible for the British properly to guard merchant ships. By mid-May the submarines were operating between Madagascar and Mozambique and others carried out reconnaissances of British anchorages. In June the submarines sank 14 ships of 59,205 GRT and by the end of July 1942, the submarines had sunk 20 ships of 92,498 GRT, then returned to base.

On 9 May, the raiders captured Genota, a Dutch vessel of 7,987 GRT at 15°S, 25°E. Elysia, a British vessel of 6,757 GRT, was bombarded on 5 June at 27°15′S, 36°24′E, abandoned on 9 June and was sunk by a Japanese submarine at 27°33′S, 37°05′E. Hauraki, a New Zealand vessel of 7,113 GRT, was captured on 12 July 1942 at 17°32′S, 80°25′E and taken to Singapore as a prize. Survivors were left to their fate but most were rescued by Allied ships. Hōkoku Maru and Aikoku Maru had sunk or taken as prize five merchant ships of 31,303 GRT within a year and then returned to Japan.

=== Third voyage ===
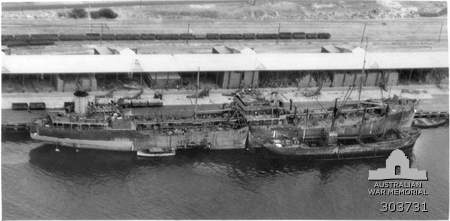
A photograph of Ondina in 1943

After the sortie in the Indian Ocean, Aikoku Maru and Hōkoku Maru returned to Japan in the autumn of 1942 and left Singapore on 5 November on their second sortie into the Indian Ocean. Ondina (Captain Willem Horsman) was a modern tanker built for La Corona, a subsidiary of Royal Dutch Shell. The ship was relatively fast and a Defensively equipped merchant ship (DEMS) with a 4-inch gun on the stern and several anti-aircraft machine-guns. The tanker sailed between Fremantle in Australia and Abadan on the Persian Gulf. En route to Abadan, it was escorted by HMIS Bengal (Lieutenant Commander W. J. Wilson, RNR) one of four Australian-type Bathurst-class corvette−minesweepers allocated to the Royal Indian Navy. In lieu of a 4-inch gun, it carried a 3-inch gun with barely enough firepower to protect Ondina from submarines. The ships departed Fremantle on 5 November 1942, expecting a long and uneventful trip.

On 11 November 1942, a lookout aboard Ondina sighted an unknown vessel at about 6.5 nmi (12 km), bearing 270 degrees, followed by a ship of similar size. As no Allied ships were in the vicinity, they were assumed to be hostile and for some time they were thought to be Japanese aircraft carriers. At 11:45, the naval authorities in Fremantle received an SOS from Bengal, reporting that they were under attack by two Japanese raiders at 19.38°S, 93.5°E. Lookouts on Bengal had seen two AMCs a few minutes after those on Ondina and Wilson ordered Ondina to "act independently". Bengal turned and headed for the attackers to make time for Ondina to escape and opened fire at 12:00 from 3,200 m (3,500 yd), claiming one hit and receiving two. As Ondina had increased the range to 7 nmi (13 km; 8.1 mi), Bengal headed for Ondina behind a smoke screen. Ondina had commenced fire at 12:05 from 4.3 nmi (8 km), its 4-inch gun a more formidable weapon than the 3-inch (12-pounder) gun on Bengal.

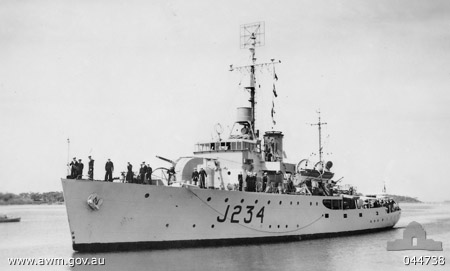
Example of a Bathurst-class corvette

Aikoku Maru and Hōkoku Maru also opened fire at 12:00 hours and soon straddled Ondina. The first hit on Ondina blew off part of the main mast; the third shell fired by Ondina hit Hōkoku Maru, apparently with little effect. The gun commander, Able Seaman H. Hammond, RANR, ordered the DEMS crew, three British army gunners, four navy gunners and a Dutch merchant navy gun layer, to check fire when Bengal crossed between the ships and Hammond took the opportunity for the crew to have a smoke break. Hōkoku Maru was not built as a warship and lacked watertight bulkheads. A hit near the stern caused an explosion and a list developed. Shells toppled from their lockers and sailors fell overboard, the engine-room caught fire and power was lost. Hōkoku Maru was so severely damaged that Imazato ordered "abandon ship". There were no reports of damage or casualties on Aikoku Maru, that achieved several hits on Ondina.

Aikoku Maru had hit Ondina several times but shell- and torpedo-fire had little effect on the empty tanker as it had so many watertight tanks. Aikoku Maru also fired on Bengal, that had shortened the range to about 2,200 m (2,400 yd). A shell in the forecastle did little damage but the gunners had been firing continuously at the Japanese ships, claiming several hits before exhausting their ammunition supply. At 12:45, with no ammunition, Wilson decided there was little he could do for the Ondina and steamed away at full speed, chased by gun splashes; the last the men aboard Bengal saw of the Ondina was it being straddled by Aikoku Maru, a shell hitting her abaft (behind, towards the stern) the bridge. Some time later, a second explosion was seen aboard Hōkoku Maru, still burning and sinking. After leaving the scene, Bengal set course for Diego Garcia, where the captain reported the Ondina and one enemy AMC sunk.

Ondina was still steaming at full speed as Aikoku Maru closed the range to 3,500 m (3,800 yd) and scored several hits, Horsman being killed by a shell splinter from a shell hitting the bridge. Ondina had twelve shells left, four of which were fired at the Hōkoku Maru, the rest at Aikoku Maru, apparently missing. The engines were stopped, the lifeboats lowered and a white flag was hoisted, under continuous fire from Aikoku Maru. Two lifeboats and two rafts were lowered into the water and later, another lifeboat was launched with the remainder of the crew. Most of the crew (except officers and gun crew) were Chinese and the helmsman, Ah Kong, kept at his post. Other Chinese crewmen were alleged to have refused to provide any assistance to save the ship.

Aikoku Maru closed to about 400 m (1,300 ft) and fired two torpedoes to finish the ship off. Both hit and left big holes in the starboard side but did not sink the ship. Its tanks had been empty and the ship remained afloat on the other, undamaged tanks, despite a 30–35 degree list. The Japanese gunners machine-gunned the lifeboats, killing one sailor and leaving three others badly wounded. One of them was a young British sailor named Henry, originally assigned to Bengal. Aikoku Maru steamed away to pick up survivors from Hōkoku Maru and rescued 278 men from the crew of 354. Imazato being one of the 76 men killed; Aikoku Maru returned, firing a torpedo that missed the tanker.

The first officer, Rehwinkel, wanted to return to the tanker but only one man in the gun crew was willing to go with him; most of the others were convinced the Ondina was doomed. Rehwinkel managed to assemble a small number of men and returned to the ship, where counter-flooding reduced the list and inspection revealed that her engines were still operational. Small fires were extinguished and the last crew members in the lifeboats were taken aboard, after they had been convinced there was no danger of sinking. The lifeboats were patched up as well as possible, in case the Aikoku Maru came back and Ondina began a return voyage to Fremantle on 12 November.

Henry had a crushed leg and after two days the first officer was forced to send out a signal for help in clear, because the code books had been thrown overboard when "abandon ship" was ordered. This unexpected signal caused surprise in Colombo, as Ondina had been reported sunk and the British suspected a Japanese trick. A request went out from Fremantle to report her position. Equally wary of a ruse, Ondina did not reply. Ondina steamed towards Fremantle and on 17 November an Australian PBY Catalina flying-boat was sighted, about 200 nmi (370 km; 230 mi) north-west of Fremantle. The lookouts had reported a ship some time earlier and the Catalina was asked if that ship could provide help. The unknown vessel proved to be a hospital ship where doctors immediately began blood transfusions that saved Henry's life. Bengal entered Diego Garcia on 17 November and on 18 November Ondina entered Fremantle. Ondina remained in Australia as a depot ship until 1943, when it was repaired; both ships survived the war.

=== Aftermath ===
The loss of Hōkoku Maru forced the Japanese to abandon commerce raiding and the Imperial Japanese Navy did not try to raid the Indian Ocean again until early 1944, when three heavy cruisers conducted the Japanese Indian Ocean raid (1944). It remains uncertain as to which vessel fired the shot that destroyed Hōkoku Maru. Ondina and Bengal claimed the hit, although the Japanese thought it was Ondina. The shell hit the starboard torpedo launcher, causing the torpedo to explode. Bengal was given the credit, which was used by the British as propaganda in India, where they were struggling to keep control of the local population.

Ondina was awarded the Koninklijke Vermelding by Dagorder (Royal Mention in Daily Orders) issued on 9 July 1948. Captain Willem Horsman became Ridder in de Militaire Willemsorde der 4de Klasse (Knight in the Military William Order of the 4th Class) posthumously and was Mentioned in Dispatches, while gunner H. Hammond, received the Distinguished Service Medal and the Bronzen Kruis. Wilson received the Distinguished Service Order and eight of his Indian crewmen were awarded decorations.

=== Loss of Aikoku Maru ===
Aikoku Maru was converted into a high-speed transport and was sunk in February 1944 during Operation Hailstone, the bombardment by American aircraft of the Japanese base at Truk in the South Seas Mandate.

== See also ==
- List of Japanese auxiliary cruiser commerce raiders
