= List of Japanese auxiliary cruiser commerce raiders =

This is a list of the Japanese Auxiliary Cruiser Commerce Raiders in World War II.

The success of the German raiders in World War I was not lost on the Japanese. In 1941, Aikoku Maru and Hokoku Maru, two passenger-cargo vessels built for the Osaka Shipping Line’s South America route, were requisitioned for conversion to Armed Merchant Cruisers (AMC).

Before and during the Pacific War, Japan converted 14 merchant ships to Armed Merchant Cruisers (AMCs). Although two of these ships initially enjoyed some successes by sinking the American freighters Malama and Vincent and the British Elysia, the early loss of the Hokoku Maru after a battle with the armed Dutch tanker Ondina and the pressing need for more transports to support their far-flung Pacific empire resulted in the reconversion of most of Japan’s AMC fleet. By the end of 1943, five of their AMCs had been sunk and seven reconverted. The remaining two were lost in 1944.

Unlike the Kriegsmarine's raider Atlantis, that stayed at sea 622 days in World War II and sank or captured 23 ships of 145,697 tons, most Japanese AMCs had but short and undistinguished careers.

== Aikoku Maru class ==
- Hōkoku Maru
- Aikoku Maru
- Gokoku Maru

== Akagi Maru class ==
- Akagi Maru
- Asaka Maru
- Awata Maru

== Bangkok Maru class ==
- Bangkok Maru
- Saigon Maru

== Kinjosan Maru class ==
- Kinjosan Maru

== Kinryu Maru class ==
- Kinryu Maru

== Kiyosumi Maru class ==
- Kiyosumi Maru

== Kongō Maru class ==
- Kongō Maru (1935)

== Noshiro Maru Class ==
- Noshiro Maru

== Ukishima Maru class ==
- Ukishima Maru

== See also ==
- Japanese raiders in the Indian Ocean Aikoku Maru and Hokoku Maru
