= Hōkoku Maru-class ocean liner =

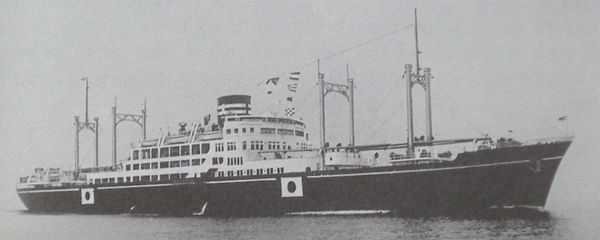
- O.S.K. Lines Hōkoku Maru in 1940

Class overview
- Name: Hōkoku Maru class ocean liner
- Builders: Mitsui Engineering & Shipbuilding; Tama Shipyards
- Operators: O.S.K. Lines; Imperial Japanese Navy
- Built: 1938 – 1942
- In commission: 1940 – 1944
- Planned: 3
- Completed: 3
- Lost: 3

General characteristics
- Type: Ocean liner
- Displacement: 7,410 long tons (7,529 t) gross
- Length: 160.8 m (527 ft 7 in) overall
- Beam: 20.1 m (65 ft 11 in)
- Draught: 12.5 m (41 ft 0 in)
- Propulsion: 2 × Mitsui-B&W Model 12-62 VF-115 diesels, 2 shafts; cruising: 13,000 bhp; full boost: 19,427 bhp
- Speed: Hokoku Maru; 21.1 knots (24.3 mph; 39.1 km/h); Aikoku Maru; 20.9 knots (24.1 mph; 38.7 km/h); Gokoku Maru; 20.6 knots (23.7 mph; 38.2 km/h)
- Capacity: 400 passengers (48 first class, 48 special-third class, 304 third class); 12,000 cubic meters freight
- Crew: 150
- Armament: Hōkoku Maru in October 1941; 8 × 150 mm (5.9 in) L/40 naval guns; 2 × 76.2 mm (3.00 in) L/40 AA guns; 4 × 533 mm (21.0 in) torpedo tubes; Aikoku Maru in March 1942; 8 × 140 mm L/50 naval guns; 4 × 25 mm AA guns; 4 × 533 mm torpedo tubes; Gokoku Maru as built; 8 × 150 mm L/40 naval guns; 4 × 13 mm AA guns; 4 × 533 mm torpedo tubes; Gokoku Maru in 1944; 2 × 120 mm (4.7 in) L/40 AA guns; 4 × 25 mm AA guns; 4 × 13 mm AA guns; 2 × 7.7 mm machine guns; 6 × depth charges
- Aircraft carried: Hōkoku Maru and Aikoku Maru in 1941; 2 × Kawanishi E7K; Hōkoku Maru and Aikoku Maru in August 1942; 2 × Aichi E13A; Gokoku Maru as built; 1 × Aichi E13A

The Hōkoku Maru-class ocean liner (報國丸型貨客船,, Hōkoku Maru-gata Kakyakusen) was a class of ocean liners of Japan, serving during 1940 and World War II.

== Background ==
- 17 May 1937, the Ōsaka Mercantile Steamship Co.Ltd. (大阪商船,, Ōsaka Shōsen Kaisha, O.S.K. Lines) placed an order for three ocean liners to reinforce the Japan-Africa route. They were named Hōkoku Maru, Aikoku Maru and Kōkoku Maru (later renamed Gokoku Maru).
- They were beautiful, and luxuriously equipped. Their suites were named after ancient Japanese cities.

== Civilian service ==
- Hōkoku Maru was completed on 15 June 1940. Her maiden voyage was 2–12 July 1940, Yokohama-Dalian.
- On 17 July 1940, she departed to South America on her only overseas voyage. After this she stayed close to the Japanese mainland, as the Imperial Japanese Navy (IJN) feared losing her.
- Aikoku Maru was completed on 31 August 1941.
- In September 1941, both ships were enlisted by the IJN.

Construction data
Name	Kanji	Builder	Laid down	Launched	Completed	Note
Hōkoku Maru	報國丸	Tama Shipyards	18 Aug 1938	5 Jul 1939	15 Jun 1940	She was enlisted by the navy on 20 Sep 1941.
Aikoku Maru	愛國丸	Tama Shipyards	28 Dec 1938	25 Apr 1940	31 Aug 1941	She was enlisted by the navy on 1 Sep 1941.
Gokoku Maru	護國丸 (ex-Kōkoku Maru (興國丸))	Mitsui, Tamano Shipyard	31 Jul 1939 as Kōkoku Maru	2 Apr 1942 as Gokoku Maru	4 Aug 1942	Renamed Gokoku Maru in early 1942. She was enlisted by the navy on 27 Jul 1942.

== Service in World War II ==
- Hōkoku Maru and Aikoku Maru became auxiliary cruisers, and they were assigned to the 24th Raider Division, Combined Fleet. When they learned of the outbreak of war they were north of Tuamotus.
- 27 April 1942, Aikoku Maru supported submarine I-30 which departed to Germany.
- 4 August 1942, Gokoku Maru was completed. She acted in the Indian Ocean until 30 November 1942.
- 11 November 1942, Hōkoku Maru was sunk by HMIS Bengal and tanker Ondina in the Indian Ocean. Aikoku Maru returned to Singapore.
- January 1943, Aikoku Maru and Gokoku Maru were dispatched to New Guinea They engaged in troop transportation duties afterward.
- 1 October 1943, they were classified to Auxiliary transport, and removed some armaments.
- 17 February 1944, Aikoku Maru was sunk by air raid at Chuuk.
- 10 November 1944, Gokoku Maru was sunk by a US submarine.

World War II service
Name	Career	Fate
Hōkoku Maru	Classified to auxiliary cruiser on 20 Sep 1941	Sunk by HMIS Bengal and armed tanker Ondina at southwest of Cocos 20°00′S 93°00′E, 11 Nov 1942
Aikoku Maru	Classified to auxiliary cruiser on 5 Sep 1941; Classified to auxiliary transport on 1 Oct 1943	Sunk during the Operation Hailstone, 17 Feb 1944
Gokoku Maru	Classified to auxiliary cruiser on 4 Aug 1942; Classified to auxiliary transport on 1 Oct 1943	Sunk by USS Barb off Gotō Islands 33°31′N 129°19′E, 10 Nov 1944

== Photos ==
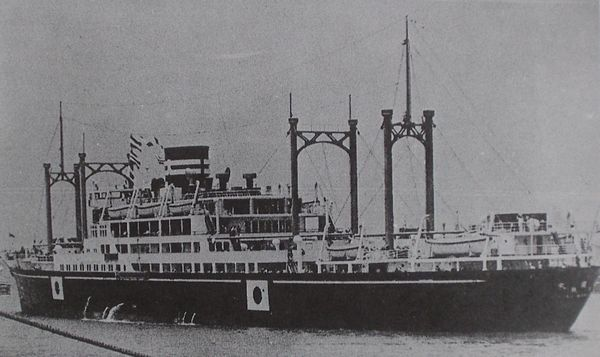
O.S.K. Lines Hōkoku Maru

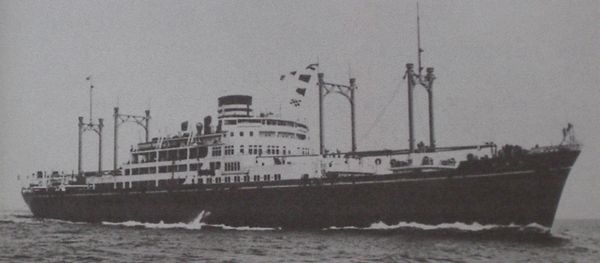
O.S.K. Lines Aikoku Maru in 1941

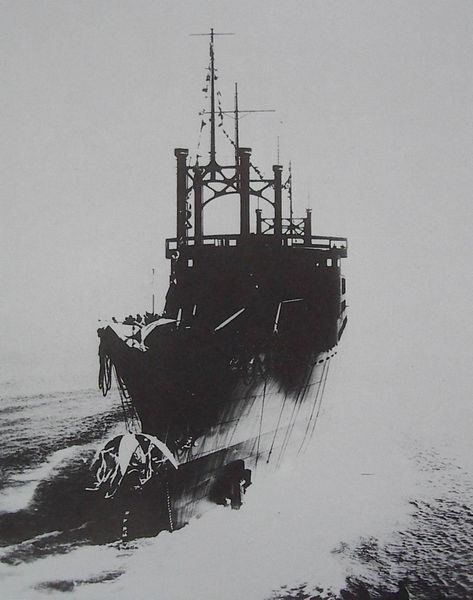
O.S.K. Lines Gokoku Maru on 2 April 1942
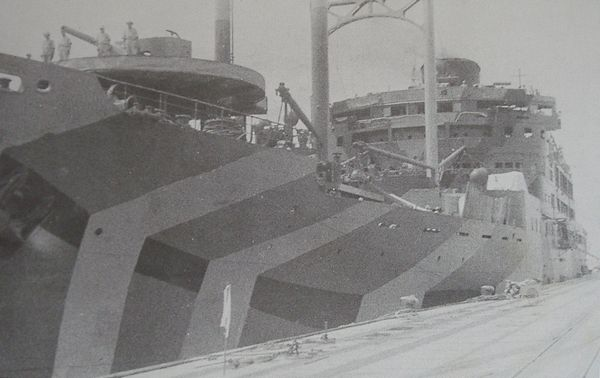
IJN Hōkoku Maru in May 1942 at Penang

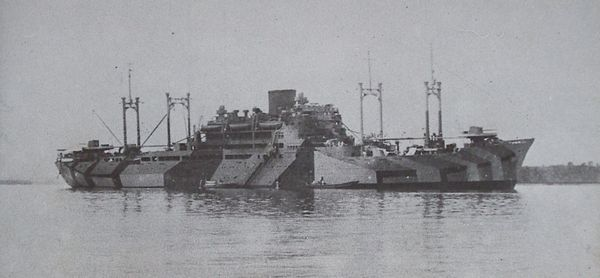
IJN Hōkoku Maru on 29 July 1942 at Seletar

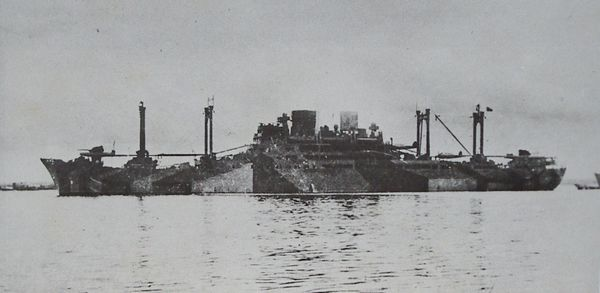
IJN Hōkoku Maru on 18 September 1942 at Seletar

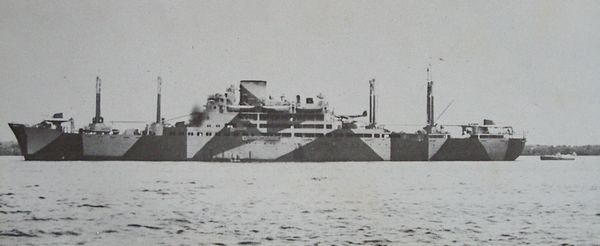
IJN Aikoku Maru on 22 August 1942 at Seletar

== Bibliography ==
- Hannig, Marcus (2012). "Japanese WW II Armed Merchant Cruisers". Warship International. XLIX (1): 34–36. ISSN 0043-0374.
- Tashirō Iwashige, The visual guide of Japanese wartime merchant marine, "Dainippon Kaiga". Archived from the original on December 7, 2002. (Japan), May 2009
- Hisashi Noma (private publication), The Story of Mitsui and O.S.K. Liners lost during the Pacific War, May 2002
- Monthly Ships of the World No.535, "Kaijinsha"., (Japan), February 1998
- The Maru Special, Japanese Naval Vessels No.53, "Japanese support vessels", "Ushio Shobō". (Japan), July 1981
