= Japanese submarine I-16 =

Type C cruiser submarine

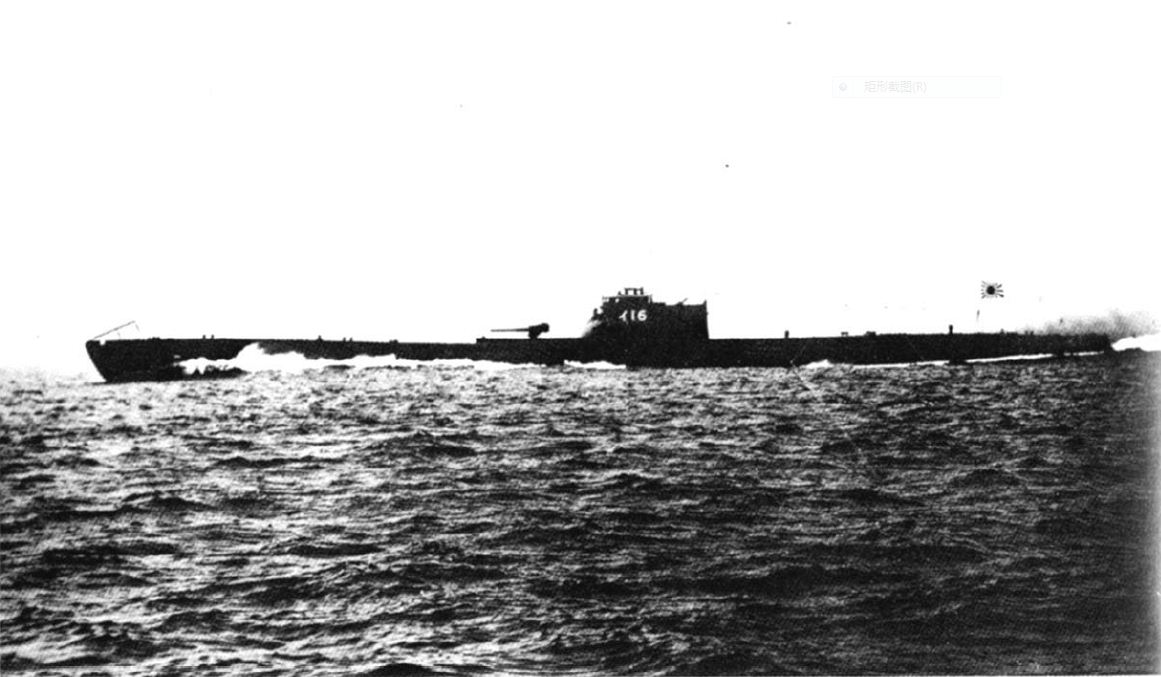
- I-16 in 1940.

History

Empire of Japan
- Name: Submarine No. 44
- Builder: Mitsubishi Kobe Yard, Kobe, Japan
- Yard number: 44
- Laid down: 15 September 1937
- Renamed: I-16 on 1 June 1938
- Launched: 8 July 1938
- Commissioned: 30 March 1940
- Fate: Sunk in the Solomon Islands, 19 May 1944
- Stricken: 10 October 1944

General characteristics
- Class & type: Type C submarine
- Displacement: 2,595 tonnes (2,554 long tons) surfaced; 3,618 tonnes (3,561 long tons) submerged
- Length: 109.3 m (358 ft 7 in) overall
- Beam: 9.1 m (29 ft 10 in)
- Draft: 5.3 m (17 ft 5 in)
- Installed power: 12,400 bhp (9,200 kW) (diesel); 2,000 hp (1,500 kW) (electric motor)
- Propulsion: Diesel-electric; 2 × diesel engines; 2 × electric motors
- Speed: 23.5 knots (43.5 km/h; 27.0 mph) surfaced; 8 knots (15 km/h; 9.2 mph) submerged
- Range: 14,000 nmi (26,000 km; 16,000 mi) at 16 knots (30 km/h; 18 mph) surfaced; 60 nmi (110 km; 69 mi) at 3 knots (5.6 km/h; 3.5 mph) submerged
- Test depth: 100 m (330 ft)
- Crew: 107
- Armament: 8 × bow 533 mm (21 in) torpedo tubes; 1 × 14 cm (5.5 in) deck gun; 2 × single or twin 25 mm (1 in) Type 96 anti-aircraft guns
- Notes: Fitted to carry 1 × Type A midget submarine

I-16 (伊16) was the first Type C cruiser submarines built for the Imperial Japanese Navy. Commissioned in 1940, she deployed a midget submarine for the attack on Pearl Harbor and for an attack on ships at Diego-Suarez in Madagascar, conducted an anti-shipping patrol in the Indian Ocean, and took part in the Guadalcanal campaign, New Guinea campaign, and Bougainville campaign before she was sunk in May 1944.

== Design and description ==
The Type C submarines were derived from the earlier Kaidai-type VI with a heavier torpedo armament for long-range attacks. They displaced 2,595 tonnes (2,554 long tons) surfaced and 3,618 tonnes (3,561 long tons) submerged. The submarines were 109.3 meters (358 ft 7 in) long, had a beam of 9.1 meters (29 ft 10 in) and a draft of 5.3 meters (17 ft 5 in). They had a diving depth of 100 meters (330 ft).

For surface running, the boats were powered by two 6,200-brake-horsepower (4,623 kW) diesel engines, each driving one propeller shaft. When submerged each propeller was driven by a 1,000-horsepower (746 kW) electric motor. They could reach 23.6 knots (43.7 km/h; 27.2 mph) on the surface and 8 knots (15 km/h; 9.2 mph) underwater. On the surface, the C1s had a range of 14,000 nautical miles (26,000 km; 16,000 mi) at 16 knots (30 km/h; 18 mph); submerged, they had a range of 60 nmi (110 km; 69 mi) at 3 knots (5.6 km/h; 3.5 mph).

The boats were armed with eight internal bow 53.3 cm (21.0 in) torpedo tubes and carried a total of 20 torpedoes. They were also armed with a single 140 mm (5.5 in)/40 deck gun and two single or twin mounts for 25 mm (1 in) Type 96 anti-aircraft guns. They were equipped to carry one Type A midget submarine aft of the conning tower.

== Construction and commissioning ==
I-16 was laid down on 15 September 1937 at the Mitsubishi's Kobe Yard in Kobe, Japan, as Submarine No. 44, the first of eight submarines of the C1 subclass. Renamed I-16 on 1 June 1938, she was launched on 8 July 1938 and towed to Kure Naval Arsenal at Kure for completion. She was completed and commissioned on 30 March 1940.

== Service history ==
=== Pre-World War II ===
Upon completion, I-16 was attached to the Yokosuka Naval District. In the autumn of 1941, she underwent conversion into a mother ship for a Type A midget submarine; The submarines I-18, I-20, I-22, and I-24 also underwent the conversion. By 15 November 1941, I-16 was assigned to Submarine Division 1 in Submarine Squadron 1 in the 6th Fleet.

At the Kure Navy Club in Kure, Japan, on 17 November 1941, the commander of Submarine Division 3 briefed the commanding officers of the five converted submarines on the upcoming attack on Pearl Harbor and on the role of their submarines in it. He had been designated the commander of the Special Attack Unit, made up of all five submarines, each of which was to launch a Type A midget submarine off Pearl Harbor so that the midget submarines could participate in the attack. I-22 was to serve as flagship of the Special Attack unit.

On 18 November 1941, the five submarines moved from Kure to the Kamegakubi Naval Proving Ground, where each embarked a Type A midget submarine. At 02:15 on 19 November 1941, the five submarines got underway from Kamegakubi bound for the Hawaiian Islands, taking a direct route that took them south of Midway Atoll. While at sea, they received the message "Climb Mount Niitaka 1208" (Japanese: Niitakayama nobore 1208) from the Combined Fleet on 2 December 1941, indicating that war with the Allies would commence on 8 December 1941 Japan time, which was on 7 December 1941 on the other side of the International Date Line in Hawaii.

=== Pearl Harbor ===
At 00:42 on 7 December 1941, I-16 became the first of the five submarines to launch her midget submarine, No. 16, 7 nautical miles (13 km; 8.1 mi) south-southwest of the entrance to Pearl Harbor. She and the other four "mother" submarines then proceeded to the planned recovery area for their midget submarines west of Lanai, where they spent the night of 7–8 December 1941. At 22:41 on 7 December, she received a message from No. 16 describing the air attack on Pearl Harbor as successful, and at 00:51 on 8 December she received another message that read "Unable to navigate." She never heard from No. 16 again. Early on 9 December 1941, I-18, I-20, and I-24 received orders to leave the recovery area, but I-16 and I-22 stayed until 11 December 1941. None of the five midget submarines returned. I-16 departed Hawaiian waters on 12 December and proceeded to Kwajalein, which she reached on 20 December 1941.

=== December 1941–April 1942 ===
Ordered home to Japan to take part in the testing of access tubes that would allow the members of a midget submarine crew to board their craft while the "mother" submarine remained submerged, I-16 got underway from Kwajalein on 25 December 1941. She arrived at Yokosuka on 3 January 1942 and later moved to Kure to take part in the tests.

During I-16′s stay in Japan, the German naval staff in Berlin formally requested on 27 March 1942 that Japan begin attacks on Allied convoys in the Indian Ocean. On 8 April 1942, the Japanese formally agreed to meet this request by dispatching submarines to operate off the coast of East Africa, and that day they withdrew Submarine Division 1 of Submarine Squadron 8 from its base at Kwajalein to Japan. By 16 April 1942 they had created the "A" detachment within Submarine Squadron 8, consisting of I-16 and the submarines I-10, I-18, I-20, and I-30, as well as midget submarines and the auxiliary cruisers Aikoku Maru and Hōkoku Maru, which were to operate as supply ships for the submarines. That morning, the commander of the 6th Fleet, Vice Admiral Teruhisa Komatsu, the commander of Submarine Squadron 8, their staffs, and the midget submarine crews paid a courtesy call on the commander-in-chief of the Combined Fleet, Admiral Isoroku Yamamoto, aboard his flagship, the battleship Yamato, at Hashirajima anchorage. After the visit with Yamamoto, the detachment got underway at 11:00, bound for Penang in Japanese-occupied British Malaya.

During the detachment′s voyage, 16 United States Army Air Forces B-25 Mitchell bombers launched by the aircraft carrier USS Hornet struck targets on Honshu in the Doolittle Raid on 18 April 1942. The detachment received orders from the 6th Fleet that day to divert from its voyage and head northeast, passing north of the Bonin Islands, to intercept the U.S. Navy task force that had launched the strike. The detachment failed to find the U.S. ships and soon resumed its voyage.

I-30 and Aikoku Maru called at Penang from 20 April to 22 April 1942 before heading into the Indian Ocean to conduct an advance reconnaissance of the "A" Detachment′s planned operating area. The rest of the "A" Detachment reached Penang on 27 April 1942, where the seaplane carrier Nisshin — which had undergone modifications allowing her to carry Type A midget submarines — rendezvoused with it. I-16, I-18, and I-20 each embarked a midget submarine at Penang.

=== Indian Ocean operation ===
I-16 and the other "A" detachment units got underway from Penang on 30 April 1942, headed westward into the Indian Ocean with I-10 serving as the detachment′s flagship. The submarines refueled at sea from Aikoku Maru and Hōkoku Maru on 5, 10, and 15 May 1942. I-16 suffered a mishap southeast of Madagascar on 17 May 1942 when seawater flooded her port diesel engine in heavy seas, but her crew made repairs.

I-10′s Yokosuka E14Y1 (Allied reporting name "Glen") floatplane began reconnaissance flights over ports in South Africa by reconnoitering Durban on 20 May 1942, followed by flights over East London, Port Elizabeth, and Simon's Town over the next week, and by 24 May the "A" detachment submarines were encountering heavy Allied shipping traffic as they approached East Africa. On the night of 29 May, I-10′s floatplane flew over Diego-Suarez, Madagascar, sighting the British battleship HMS Ramillies among the ships anchored there. The "A" detachment commander selected Diego-Suarez as the target for a midget submarine attack, scheduled for 30 May 1942.

On 30 May 1942, I-18 could not launch her midget submarine because it suffered engine failure, but I-16 and I-20 launched their midgets 10 nautical miles (19 km; 12 mi) off Diego-Suarez, I-16 launching hers at 17:40. I-16′s midget was never heard from again, but I-20′s midget torpedoed Ramillies and the tanker British Loyalty, damaging the former and sinking the latter, before it, too, was lost. The body of a Japanese sailor found on 2 June 1942 washed up on a beach near Diego Suarez probably was that of one of the two men aboard I-16′s midget.

After the midget submarine attack, the "A" detachment began anti-shipping operations. I-16 torpedoed and used gunfire to sink the Yugoslavian 3,889-ton merchant ship Susak at 15°42′S 040°58′E on 6 June 1942 and sank the Greek 4,847-ton merchant ship Agios Georgios IV by gunfire at 16°12′S 041°00′E on 8 June 1942. She also torpedoed and sank the Yugoslavian 3,748-ton merchant ship Supetar at 21°49′S 035°50′E on 12 June 1942 and the Swedish 5,243-ton merchant ship Eknaren at 17°00′S 040°00′E on 1 July 1942. On 26 July 1942, she conducted a reconnaissance of Diego Garcia, and she returned to Penang on 10 August 1942. She soon got underway for Japan and arrived at Yokosuka on 26 August 1942 to undergo an overhaul.

=== Guadalcanal campaign ===
Meanwhile, the Guadalcanal campaign had begun on 7 August 1942 with U.S. amphibious landings on Guadalcanal, Tulagi, Florida Island, Gavutu, and Tanambogo in the southeastern Solomon Islands. With her overhaul complete, I-16 got underway from Yokosuka on 17 October 1942 to take part in the fighting in the Solomons. On 2 November 1942, she arrived at an anchorage off Shortland Island in the Shortland Islands, where I-16, I-20, and I-24 formed an attack group and each received orders to load a midget submarine delivered by the seaplane tender Chiyoda.

I-16 embarked the midget submarine No. 30 at 13:00 on 4 November 1942, and that day she and I-24 got underway for the Indispensable Strait. She reached her launch area off Guadalcanal at 06:00 on 7 November 1942. At 02:00 on 11 November, No. 30′s two-man crew manned their craft, and at 03:49 I-16 submerged when she sighted a United States Navy PT boat. She launched No. 30 10.8 nautical miles (20.0 km; 12.4 mi) off Cape Esperance on Guadalcanal′s northwestern coast at 04:21. No. 30′s steering system suffered damage during her launch, and No. 30 lost steering at 04:24. No. 30 aborted her mission, surfaced, and headed toward Japanese-held Kamimbo Bay on the northwestern coast of Guadalcanal, but her crew sighted an Allied aircraft and scuttled her. They swam to shore, arriving safely at the Japanese midget submarine base at Maravovo, Guadalcanal, at 19:00.

I-16, meanwhile, was returning to the Shortland anchorage. While en route, she received orders on 13 November 1942 to locate the crippled Japanese battleship Hiei, which had been crippled off northwestern Guadalcanal in the First Naval Battle of Guadalcanal early that morning, and sink her if she was still afloat. I-16 reached the area of the battle but failed to find Hiei, which sank early that evening.

At the Shortland anchorage, I-16 embarked the midget submarine No. 10 and again departed for Guadalcanal, planning to target Allied ships off Lungga Point on Guadalcanal′s northern coast. At 02:55 on 28 November 1942, she launched No. 10 north of Guadalcanal 21 nautical miles (39 km; 24 mi) from Savo Island. No. 10 penetrated the screen of destroyers protecting the anchorage and at 08:16 torpedoed and damaged the cargo ship USS Alchiba 3,000 yards (2,700 m) northeast of Lungga Point, so badly damaging Alchiba that she beached herself to avoid sinking and burned for four days. No. 10 and her two-man crew were never heard from again.

I-16 embarked the midget submarine No. 22 at the Shortland anchorage and returned to the waters off Guadalcanal. At 04:48 on 3 December 1942, she launched No. 22 10 nautical miles (19 km; 12 mi) off Savo Island. At dawn, No. 22 sighted the hospital ship USS Solace off Lungga Point, then fired both of her torpedoes at a destroyer heading for the same area. Both torpedoes missed. No. 22′s crew scuttled her and swam safely to Guadalcanal at Cape Esperance.

I-16 next received orders to take part in an effort to resupply by submarine the Japanese forces fighting on Guadalcanal. She departed Truk on 6 January 1943 on her first supply run, carrying supplies in drums. Arriving at Cape Esperance on 13 January 1943, she found no Daihatsu-class landing craft waiting to unload her because of Allied aircraft patrolling over the area, so her crew threw the supply drums overboard for the Daihatsus to retrieve from the water later and she got back underway, heading for Rabaul on New Britain. She returned to Cape Esperance on 25 January 1943 and unloaded 18 tons of supplies in containers.

On 31 January 1943, a Japanese task force of aircraft carriers, battleships, cruisers, and destroyers sortied from Truk to cover Operation Ke, the Japanese evacuation of their forces from Guadalcanal, and I-16 and the submarines I-11, I-25, and I-32 patrolled southeast of Guadalcanal in support of the operation. The Japanese completed Operation Ke on 9 February 1943 after evacuating 11,700 personnel from Guadalcanal.

On 7 May 1943, the U.S. Navy submarine rescue vessel USS Ortolan salvaged a Japanese midget submarine off the north coast of Guadalcanal, towed her to Kukum Bay on the coast of Guadalcanal that month, and then transported her to Nouméa, New Caledonia, in June 1943. She eventually was placed on display at the Submarine Force Library and Museum in Groton, Connecticut. She has been identified as both No. 10 and No. 30, and as No. 8, which I-20 launched on 2 December 1942.

=== New Guinea campaign ===
I-16 next received orders to carry supplies to Japanese forces fighting in the New Guinea campaign. On her first supply run, she unloaded 40 tons of cargo, including 30 supply drums, at Lae on the coast of New Guinea. She then headed for Rabaul, and during the voyage collided underwater with I-20 on 2 April 1943. After calling at Rabaul, she got underway for Japan, where she arrived at Yokosuka on 16 April 1943 to undergo repairs and a refit.

Once again ready for sea, I-16 departed Yokosuka on 21 September 1943, called at Truk, and then resumed her New Guinea supply runs. She called at Sio, New Guinea, on her first two runs on 17 and 25 October 1943. On her third run, she disembarked 30 soldiers of the 85th Guard Unit at Sio on 2 November 1943. She visited Sio again on 9 and 20 November 1943.

On 24 November 1943, I-16 embarked the newly appointed commander of the 9th Fleet, Vice Admiral Yoshikazu Endo, and his staff at Rabaul in addition to cargo for New Guinea. After calling at Sio on 27 November 1943 to unload her cargo, she proceeded to Wewak, New Guinea, where she arrived on 30 November 1943 and Endo and his staff disembarked. I-16 subsequently made her last New Guinea supply run, visiting Sio on 15 December 1943, then suffered damage at Rabaul in an Allied air raid on 25 December 1943. She departed Rabaul that day bound for Truk, then set course for Yokosuka, where she arrived on 1 January 1944 and was drydocked to undergo repairs.

=== Later operations ===
I-16′s repairs were completed in early February 1944, and on 17 March 1944 she departed Yokosuka and proceeded to Truk, which became her new base.

At 08:00 on 14 May 1944, I-16 got underway from Truk for a supply run to Buin on Bougainville to deliver rice in 75-pound (34 kg) rubber bags to Japanese forces fighting in the Bougainville campaign. She transmitted a message to the commander of Submarine Squadron 7 on Saipan in the Mariana Islands to inform him that her estimated time of arrival at Buin was 20:00 on 22 May 1944. Fleet Radio Unit Pacific (FRUPAC), a U.S. Navy signals intelligence and cryptographic unit in Hawaii, intercepted and decrypted the message, which was passed through channels to the commander of U.S. Navy Escort Division 39 at Tulagi. He, in turn, on 18 May 1944 ordered three destroyer escorts — USS George and USS Raby of his own division and USS England of Escort Division 40, which was under his tactical command — to intercept I-16. The three destroyer escorts formed a hunter-killer group and got underway from Purvis Bay that afternoon, heading for 05°10′S 158°10′E, where FRUPAC's information indicated that they could intercept I-16.

=== Loss ===
Five days into I-16′s supply run to Buin, an American patrol plane sighted her on the surface 140 nautical miles (260 km; 160 mi) northeast of Cape Alexander on Choiseul on 19 May 1944 and alerted the three destroyer escorts. England, George, and Raby began a line-abreast sonar sweep, and at 13:35 England detected I-16 on sonar. England attacked I-16 at 13:41 with the first of five "Hedgehog" spigot mortar barrages. After the last attack, a huge underwater explosion at an estimated depth of 500 feet (152 m) or more lifted England′s stern 6 inches (15 cm) out of the water, marking the sinking of I-16 at 05°10′S 158°10′E. The first debris reached the surface 20 minutes later and included shreds of cork, deck planking, pieces of cabinetry, other objects, and finally a sealed rubber container with a bag of rice inside. Almost an hour later, a small oil slick appeared, and by 20 May 1944 it was 6 nautical miles (11 km; 6.9 mi) long and 3 nautical miles (5.6 km; 3.5 mi) wide.

I-16 was the first of six Japanese submarines England sank over a 13-day period in May 1944: Her later victims were Ro-106 on 22 May, Ro-104 on 23 May, Ro-116 on 24 May, Ro-108 on 26 May, and Ro-105 on 31 May.

On 25 June 1944, the Imperial Japanese Navy declared I-16 to be presumed lost in the Solomon Islands with her entire crew of 107. She was stricken from the Navy list on 10 October 1944.

== Wreck ==
Her wreck has never been found.

== Sinkings summary ==
I-16 sank four ships during her career with a combined loss of 14 lives.

Date	Name	Nationality	Tonnage (Note: Merchant ship tonnages are in gross register tons. Military vessels are listed by tons displacement.)	Fate
6 June 1942	Susak	(Kingdom of Yugoslavia) Yugoslavia	3,889	Sunk
8 June 1942	Agios Georgios IV	Greece	4,847	Sunk
12 June 1942	Supetar	(Kingdom of Yugoslavia) Yugoslavia	3,748	Sunk
1 July 1942	Eknaren	Sweden	5,243	Sunk
