= Tamotsu Oishi =

Japanese admiral (1900–1946)

Rear Admiral Tamotsu Oishi
- 大石 保
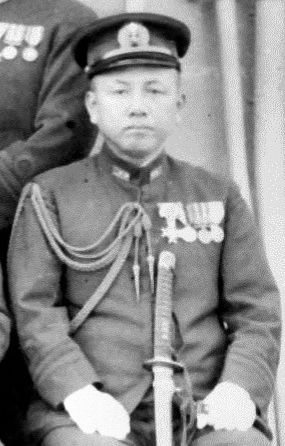
- Oishi as staff of the 1st Air Fleet, 1941-42
- Born: January 28, 1900; Kōchi, Kōchi, Japan
- Died: February 13, 1946 (aged 46)
- Military career
- Allegiance: Empire of Japan
- Branch: Imperial Japanese Navy
- Service years: 1920–1946
- Rank: Rear Admiral (posthumous)
- Commands: Saga, Aikoku Maru
- Conflicts: World War II; Pacific War; Attack on Pearl Harbor; Battle of Wake Island; Indian Ocean Raid; Battle of Midway

Tamotsu Oishi (大石 保, Ōishi Tamotsu; 28 January 1900 – 13 February 1946) was a career officer in the Imperial Japanese Navy during World War II.

== Biography ==
Born in Kōchi Prefecture, Oishi graduated from the 48th class of the Imperial Japanese Naval Academy in 1920, with a ranking of 13th out of a class of 171 cadets. As a midshipman, he served on the cruiser Iwate and battleship Nagato. After his promotion to ensign in 1921, he was assigned to the destroyer Yukaze, followed by the oiler Shiretoko, and then the battleship Mutsu.

After his promotion to lieutenant on 1 December 1925, he specialized in navigation and served as chief navigator on the destroyers Harukaze and Urakaze, submarine tender Jingei, and cruiser Tsushima.

Oishi graduated from the Naval Staff College in 1930 and was promoted to lieutenant commander in 1932. He served as chief torpedo officer on the cruiser Jintsu. After his promotion to commander in 1937, he received his first command: the gunboat Saga in 1938. He subsequently served in a number of staff positions, including assignments to the 1st Carrier Strike Force of the Combined Fleet and 1st Air Fleet, participating in all major carrier operations from the attack on Pearl Harbor to the Battle of Midway.

On 25 August 1942, Oishi was assigned command of Aikoku Maru, a merchant raider, and was promoted to captain the same year. In September, Aikoku Maru was assigned to the Southwest Area Fleet (IJN 8th Fleet) and tasked to transport elements of General Tanayoshi Sano's IJA 38th Division to Rabaul for the reinforcement of Guadalcanal. In November 1942, while on a raiding mission in the Indian Ocean, Aikoku Maru attacked the Royal Dutch Shell oil tanker Ondina. From December 1943-April 1944, Aikoku Maru participated in reinforcement operations to New Guinea.

On 3 April 1943, Oishi was recalled to Japan, and held several shore positions until the end of the war. He died on 13 February 1946, and was promoted to rear-admiral posthumously, the last Imperial Japanese Navy promotion made to that rank.
