= List of shipwrecks in January 1939 =

The list of shipwrecks in January 1939 includes ships sunk, foundered, grounded, or otherwise lost during January 1939.

== 1 January ==
List of shipwrecks: 1 January 1939
Ship	State	Description
Anadolu	Turkey	The cargo ship ran aground in a storm at Bender Eregli.
Calchas	United Kingdom	The cargo ship ran aground off the Kelsnor Lighthouse, Langeland, Denmark. Refloated on 5 January but damaged and leaking.
Galata	Turkey	The cargo ship ran aground in a storm at Bender Eregli.
Ikbal	Turkey	The cargo ship ran aground in a storm at Bender Eregli. Refloated on 8 January.
Kaplan	Turkey	The cargo ship sank in a storm at Bender Eregli.
Millet	Turkey	The cargo ship sank in a storm at Bender Eregli. Only two crew survived.
Mete	Turkey	The cargo ship ran aground in a storm at Bender Eregli. Refloated on 21 January.
Nicolaos Nomicos	Greece	The cargo ship sank in a storm at Bender Eregli. She was refloated on 9 January.
Sadan	Turkey	The cargo ship ran aground in a storm at Bender Eregli. She was refloated on 18 January.
Samsun	Turkey	The cargo ship ran aground in a storm at Bender Eregli. She was refloated on 26 January.
Sumer	Turkey	The cargo ship sank in a storm at Bender Eregli. She was refloated on 9 January.
Tan	Turkey	The cargo ship ran aground in a storm at Bender Eregli. She was refloated on 6 January.
Zonguldak	Turkey	The cargo ship ran aground in a storm at Bender Eregli. She was refloated on 8 January.

== 2 January ==
List of shipwrecks: 2 January 1939
Ship	State	Description
Galatea	Norway	The cargo ship was driven ashore on Saltholm, Copenhagen, Denmark. She was refloated on 5 January.
Mexico	Norway	The tanker ran aground at Dragør, Denmark.
Tilda	Finland	The cargo ship was driven ashore at Setúbal, Portugal. She was refloated the next day after 350 tons of oil was discharged.

== 4 January ==
List of shipwrecks: 4 January 1939
Ship	State	Description
Chief Wawatam	United States	The train ferry ran aground on the North Graham Shoal in the Straits of Mackinac. She was refloated on 9 January.
"Maurice Rene"	France	The 110-foot (34 m) trawler broke loose from her moorings at Lorient, then was in a collision and sank.

== 5 January ==
List of shipwrecks: 5 January 1939
Ship	State	Description
Cheyenne	United Kingdom	The tanker ran aground at Spodsbjerg, Denmark. She was later refloated undamaged.
Kyleclare	United Kingdom	The cargo ship ran aground in the River Moy, County Mayo, Ireland. She was refloated undamaged the next day.
Shuntai Maru	Japan	The cargo ship was driven ashore in a gale at Muroran, Hokkaidō. She was later refloated.
Yubari Maru	Japan	The cargo ship was driven ashore in a gale at Muroran. She was later refloated.

== 6 January ==
List of shipwrecks: 6 January 1939
Ship	State	Description
Authorpe	Panama	Spanish Civil War: The cargo ship was bombed and sunk at Alicante by Nationalist aircraft. She was refloated in 1939 and seized by the Spanish Government. Subsequently repaired and returned to service as Alhucemas.
V11 Francisco	Spanish Republican Navy	Spanish Civil War: The auxiliary patrol ship was lost on this date.
Yamahuzi Maru	Japan	The cargo ship ran aground in the Miyako Islands. She was refloated on 3 February.

== 7 January ==
List of shipwrecks: 7 January 1939
Ship	State	Description
Helios	Germany	The cargo ship ran aground entering Pasajes Harbour, Portugal, and developed a leak.
Hoegh Silvercrest	Norway	The cargo liner ran aground at Montufar Point, San Bernardino Strait, Philippines. The ship was later abandoned by her crew. She broke up on 17 February.
Jadarland	Norway	The cargo ship ran aground at Oslo and was damaged.
Pass of Ballater	United Kingdom	The tanker ran aground at Nantes, Loire-Inférieure, France. She was refloated later that day but was found to be severely damaged.

== 8 January ==
List of shipwrecks: 8 January 1939
Ship	State	Description
Dido	Norway	The cargo ship foundered in the North Sea 95 nautical miles (176 km) south west of Utsire island with the loss of a crew member.
Saint Nazaire	France	The cargo ship ran aground off Pauillac, Gironde. She was later refloated.
Thetis	Greece	The cargo ship ran aground in the Martín García Channel, Argentina. She was refloated the next day.
Tinda	Netherlands	The cargo ship ran aground at Asnæs, Denmark. She was refloated on 10 January having sustained some damage to her bottom.

== 10 January ==
List of shipwrecks: 10 January 1939
Ship	State	Description
Berwindvale	United States	The cargo ship ran aground in the Kennebec River. She was later refloated with a damaged bottom.
Llanover	United Kingdom	The cargo ship was driven ashore in a gale at Niigata, Japan. Refloated on 25 January.
Waukegan	United States	The cargo ship collided with the St George's Bridge over the Chesapeake & Delaware Canal at St. Georges, Delaware and demolished the bridge, blocking the canal. Two people were killed.

== 11 January ==
List of shipwrecks: 11 January 1939
Ship	State	Description
Severonia	Estonia	The cargo ship ran aground at Turku, Finland. She was declared a total loss.

== 12 January ==
List of shipwrecks: 12 January 1939
Ship	State	Description
Gretaston	United Kingdom	The cargo ship ran aground at Yavaros, Mexico. She was later refloated undamaged.
Herbert G. Wylie	Venezuela	The tanker exploded and sank at the Caripito San Juan river terminal while loading oil products.
Trio	Finland	The cargo ship foundered off Den Helder, North Holland, Netherlands.

== 14 January ==
List of shipwrecks: 14 January 1939
Ship	State	Description
Cabo Cullera	Spain	Spanish Civil War: The cargo ship was bombed and sunk at Tarragona by Spanish Nationalist aircraft.

== 15 January ==
List of shipwrecks: 15 January 1939
Ship	State	Description
Cheribon Maru	Japan	The cargo ship ran aground north of Cagayan, Sulu Islands, Philippines. Twelve passengers were taken off the next day by Kamo Maru (Japan). Cheribon Maru was later salvaged and returned to service.
Conifer	United Kingdom	The cargo ship collided with Monte Santo (Italy) in the English Channel 6 nautical miles (11 km) off the Sandette Lightship (France) and sank. All nine crew were rescued by Monte Santo and landed at Vlissingen, Zeeland, Netherlands.
Elsie	Norway	The cargo ship suffered an explosion in her engine room. She came ashore at Mandal and broke in three, with the midsection sinking. Elsie was declared a total loss. All sixteen crew survived.
Wyvern	Norway	The cargo ship was driven ashore at Pensacola, Florida, United States. She was refloated later that day.

== 16 January ==
List of shipwrecks: 16 January 1939
Ship	State	Description
Cambay Star	United Kingdom	The cargo ship foundered in the Indian Ocean (18°19′N 70°40′E).
Crisabelle Stephen	United Kingdom	The 120.2-foot (36.6 m), 220-ton steam trawler ran on the Sea Stone of the Cruden Scares south of Peterhead in fog and heavy seas. She came off the rock and was put under tow to Aberdeen 14 miles (23 km) away. One and one-half hours later her skipper requested that she be beached but she rolled over and sank almost immediately, lost with all nine hands.
Kashiwa Maru	Japan	The cargo ship ran aground at Awomori.
Orion	Finland	The cargo ship ran aground on Harmaja, Helsinki.

== 17 January ==
List of shipwrecks: 17 January 1939
Ship	State	Description
Belbowrie	United Kingdom	The auxiliary schooner was driven ashore at Maroubra Bay, New South Wales, Australia and was wrecked.
Dudley Rose	United Kingdom	The cargo ship ran aground in the River Thames at Grays Thurrock, Essex. She was refloated the next day.

== 18 January ==
List of shipwrecks: 18 January 1939
Ship	State	Description
Giove	Regia Marina	The tanker ran aground in the Rooka Channel, Shatt el Arab, Iraq. She was refloated on 20 January after discharging 3,000 tons of oil.
Herzogin Cecilie	Finland	The barque capsized and sank at Starehole Bay, Devon, United Kingdom.
Ulmus	United Kingdom	The cargo ship caught fire off Gibraltar (36°14′N 6°58′W). Her crew were rescued and the ship was towed by Spanish Nationalist vessels to Barcelona. She was declared a constructive total loss, but entered Italian service in 1946 as Alberto Gianpaolo.

== 19 January ==
List of shipwrecks: 19 January 1939
Ship	State	Description
Jaguar	Norway	The tanker broke in two at approximately 35°N 46°W. All 37 crew were rescued by Duala (Norway). Stern section reported afloat on 30 January at 35°00′N 39°49′W. Reported on 7 February at 35°25′N 31°44′W. The stern section was taken in tow by Thames (Netherlands) on 11 February. Reported to be heading for Horta, Azores, Portugal, which was reached on 14 February with assistance from Seefalke (Germany). The stern section departed Horta under tow for Rotterdam, Netherlands on 22 February, where it arrived on 11 March.
Laura Annie Barnes	United Kingdom	The schooner ran aground in the Nantucket Sound, United States.
V14 Rafael	Spanish Republican Navy	Spanish Civil War: The auxiliary patrol ship was lost on this date.

== 20 January ==
List of shipwrecks: 20 January 1939
Ship	State	Description
Esbjörn	Finland	The cargo ship ran aground at Lyngsodde, Fredericia, Denmark. She was refloated later that day.

== 21 January ==
List of shipwrecks: 21 January 1939
Ship	State	Description
Koidula	Estonia	The cargo ship ran aground in the Uruguay River, Uruguay. She was refloated on 27 January after 1,700 tons of cargo was discharged.
Pacific Grove	United Kingdom	The cargo ship ran aground at Guayaquil, Ecuador.
V17 Juan Lucena	Spanish Republican Navy	Spanish Civil War: The auxiliary patrol ship was lost on this date.
Wilston	United Kingdom	The cargo ship ran aground at Wicca Pool, Zennor, Cornwall with the loss of all 30 crew.

== 22 January ==
List of shipwrecks: 22 January 1939
Ship	State	Description
Cabourg	France	The cargo ship reported passing Ouessant, Finistère whilst on a voyage from Ghent, East Flanders, Belgium to Marseille, Bouches-du-Rhône. No further trace, presumed foundered as the bodies of two crew members were later washed up.
Mado	Netherlands	The cargo ship ran aground entering Margate Harbour, Kent, United Kingdom. She was refloated the next day.
Silverash	United Kingdom	The cargo ship caught fire and sank at New York, United States. She was later refloated, and departed under tow on 23 April for Sunderland, Co Durham. Silverash arrived on 18 May. Subsequently repaired and returned to service.

== 23 January ==
List of shipwrecks: 23 January 1939
Ship	State	Description
African Mariner	United Kingdom	Spanish Civil War: The cargo ship was bombed and sunk at Barcelona by Nationalist aircraft. Two crew were killed. She was refloated on 18 April 1939 and seized by the Spanish Government, repaired and returned to service as Castillo Montjuich.
Argentina	Spain	Spanish Civil War: The passenger ship was bombed and sunk at Barcelona. She was refloated on 8 September and laid up. Argentina was scrapped in 1945.
C17	Spanish Republican Navy	Spanish Civil War: The C1-class motor launch was bombed and sunk at Barcelona.
John and Sara Eliza Stych	Royal National Lifeboat Institution	The St Ives lifeboat launched to go to the aid of a steamship off Cape Cornwall. She capsized three times; off Clodgy Point, The Island and Godrevy Point. Only one crew member survived.
Lobos	United Kingdom	The passenger ship collided with Viriglio (Italy) off Callao, Peru and was beached. She was later refloated. Lobos arrived at Lima on 17 February.
Nida	Lithuania	The cargo ship was driven ashore at Christiansø, Denmark. She was refloated later that day.
Riga	Estonia	The cargo ship was driven ashore on Christiansø.
Sulev	Estonia	The cargo ship ran aground at Nantes, Loire-Inférieure, France.
Thorpebay	United Kingdom	Spanish Civil War: The cargo ship was attacked and severely damaged by aircraft at Barcelona.
Uruguay	Spain	Spanish Civil War: The passenger ship was bombed and sunk at Barcelona by Nationalist aircraft. She was refloated on 27 July and scrapped in 1940.
V16 Maria	Spanish Republican Navy	Spanish Civil War: The auxiliary patrol ship was lost on this date.
Yolande	France	Spanish Civil War: The 1,733 GRT cargo ship was bombed and sunk at Barcelona by Nationalist aircraft. Later refloated and sold for scrapping.

== 24 January ==
List of shipwrecks: 24 January 1939
Ship	State	Description
Itanagé	Brazil	The cargo ship ran aground at Vitória, sprang a leak and was beached.
Miocene	United Kingdom	Spanish Civil War: The cargo ship was bombed and sunk at Barcelona by Nationalist aircraft. Refloated in 1940, confiscated by the Spanish Government but scrapped in 1944.
Nueve Pepe Leston	Spanish Navy	Spanish Civil War: The minesweeper was sunk by mines.
St. Clair Theriault	United Kingdom	The schooner caught fire and was abandoned in the Atlantic Ocean (47°47′N 6°55′W).
Vassos	Greece	The tanker ran aground at Lyserort, Latvia. She was refloated on 26 January.

== 25 January ==
List of shipwrecks: 25 January 1939
Ship	State	Description
Azelma	France	Spanish Civil War: The cargo ship was bombed and sunk at Sant Feliu de Guíxols by Nationalist aircraft. She was refloated in 1940, confiscated by the Spanish Government and returned to service as Castillo Javier.
Colonel Ralston	United Kingdom	The cargo ship came ashore at Annapolis, Maryland, United States and was a total loss.
Kaiapoi	Panama	The cargo ship struck rocks and sank in Wenchow Bay, China (28°16′N 121°38′E). All crew were rescued.
Supetar	Yugoslavia	The cargo ship ran aground at Karadeniz Ereğli, Turkey. She was refloated later that day.

== 26 January ==
List of shipwrecks: 26 January 1939
Ship	State	Description
Aspen	United Kingdom	The coaster ran aground at the entrance to Holyhead Harbour, Anglesey.
Fueloil	United States	The tanker ran aground on Shooters Island, New York. She was refloated later that day.
Monturiol	Spanish Republican Navy	Spanish Civil War: The auxiliary patrol ship was lost on this date.

== 27 January ==
List of shipwrecks: 27 January 1939
Ship	State	Description
Foynes	United Kingdom	Spanish Civil War: The tanker was bombed and damaged at Valencia. She capsized and sank the next day. She was refloated on 23 November, repaired and entered Spanish service as Castillo Riaza.
Kamikaze Maru	Japan	The coastal tanker capsized and sank off Kushiro.
Shun Chih	United Kingdom	The cargo ship ran aground at Swatow, China. She was refloated undamaged the next day.
Suzy	Greece	Spanish Civil War: The cargo ship was bombed and severely damaged at Valencia.

== 28 January ==
List of shipwrecks: 28 January 1939
Ship	State	Description
Lake Lugano	United Kingdom	Spanish Civil War: The steamship, already abandoned and beached in the bay of Palamós after being damaged by air attack on 6 August 1938, was shelled and wrecked by the Spanish Nationalist auxiliary cruiser Mar Negro (Spanish Navy) at 41°50′49.90″N 03°07′08.85″E.
Virgil G. Bogue	United States	The tug collided with Point Lobos (United States) in the Oakland Estuary, California and sank.

== 29 January ==
List of shipwrecks: 29 January 1939
Ship	State	Description
V12 Adela	Spanish Republican Navy	Spanish Civil War: The auxiliary patrol ship was lost on this date.

== 30 January ==
List of shipwrecks: 30 January 1939
Ship	State	Description
Garryvale	Finland	The cargo ship ran aground in the North Sea off the mouth of the River Tees. Her crew survived. She was refloated and consequently scrapped.
Julie	United Kingdom	The sailing ship was abandoned in a sinking condition 15 nautical miles (28 km) south south east of the Eddystone Lighthouse, Cornwall. Her crew were rescued by the trawler Roger Robert (Belgium).

== 31 January ==
List of shipwrecks: 31 January 1939
Ship	State	Description
Askot	Norway	The cargo ship ran aground off Foundiougne, French West Africa. She was refloated the next day.
Ohio	United States	The tug collided with Esso Belgium (Belgium) at New Orleans, Louisiana and was beached.
Robur VIII	Poland	The cargo ship ran aground north of the Terschelling Lighthouse, Friesland, Netherlands. She was refloated the next day.

== Unknown date ==
List of shipwrecks: Unknown date 1939
Ship	State	Description
Besos	Spanish Republican Navy	Spanish Civil War: The auxiliary patrol ship was lost sometime in January.
Crisabelle Stephen	United Kingdom	The fishing vessel ran aground and sank.
HMS Medea	United Kingdom	The M15-class monitor, parted her tow on her way to the breaker's yard and was driven ashore at Trebetherick Point, Cornwall or Padstow, Cornwall and was wrecked on 23 or 28 January.
V24 Teresa	Spanish Republican Navy	Spanish Civil War: The auxiliary patrol ship was lost sometime in January.
