= Japanese gunboat Saga =

Gunboat of the Imperial Japanese Navy

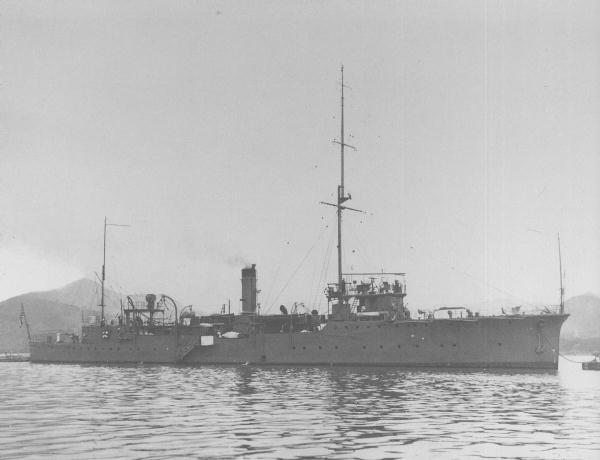
- Saga in 1915

History

Japan
- Name: Saga
- Ordered: 1911
- Builder: Sasebo Naval Arsenal, Japan
- Laid down: 7 January 1912
- Launched: 27 September 1912
- Completed: 8 November 1912
- Commissioned: 18 November 1912
- Out of service: Sunk 22 January 1945
- Stricken: 20 March 1945
- Fate: Destroyed 22 January 1945

General characteristics
- Type: River gunboat
- Displacement: 780 long tons (790 t) normal
- Length: 64 m (210 ft 0 in)
- Beam: 8.99 m (29 ft 6 in)
- Draught: 2.31 m (7 ft 7 in)
- Propulsion: 3-shaft reciprocating VTE engines; 2 boilers; 1,600 hp (1,200 kW)
- Speed: 15 knots (28 km/h; 17 mph)
- Complement: 98
- Armament: 1 × 12 cm/45 10th Year Type naval gun; 3 × 76 mm (3.0 in)/ 40 cal. guns; 3 × 6.5 mm machine guns

Saga (嵯峨) was a river gunboat of the Imperial Japanese Navy, that operated on the Yangtze River and in coastal waters of China during the 1930s, and during the Second Sino-Japanese War and World War II.

== Background ==
Saga was constructed due to dissatisfaction by the Imperial Japanese Navy with the gunboat Uji, which was underarmed, and lacked the suitable accommodations to serve as a gunboat flagship. The Japanese Navy also wanted a vessel which could serve for both coastal patrol duties as well as on inland waterways. Saga was laid down at Sasebo Naval Arsenal on 7 January 1912, launched on 27 September 1912 and entered service on 18 November 1912.

== Design ==
The basic design of Saga was modeled after her British-built predecessors, but with much larger dimensions and much more powerful engines. Saga had a hull with an overall length of 64 metres (210 ft 0 in) and width of 8.99 metres (29 ft 6 in), with a normal displacement of 780 tons and draft of 2.31 metres (7 ft 7 in). She was propelled by two reciprocating engines, powered by steam from two Kampon boilers, driving three shafts, producing 1,600 horsepower (1,200 kW) and a top speed of 15 knots (28 km/h; 17 mph). The ship was initially armed with one 12 cm/45 10th Year Type naval gun guns, three 76 mm (3.0 in)/40 cal. guns and six 6.6 mm machine guns.

== Service record ==
During the World War I, Saga accompanied the main Japanese fleet to Shandong Province, China at the Siege of Tsingtao (25 September–16 November 1914) against the forces of Imperial Germany as part of Japanese’ contribution to the Allied cause under the Anglo-Japanese Alliance. Subsequently, she was transferred to the Japanese Second Fleet and assigned to patrols in the South China Sea.

In September 1924, Saga was reassigned to the Japanese First Fleet. Commander Chūichi Nagumo served as captain from 20 March 1926 to 15 October 1926. She was reassigned to the Japanese Third Fleet from June 1931, joining the 11th Sentai in October 1937 after the Marco Polo Bridge Incident and the start of hostilities in the Second Sino-Japanese War. From 15 December 1938 to 20 October 1939, she was captained by Commander Tamotsu Oishi. From November 1939, she was assigned to the Second China Expeditionary Fleet in southern China.

At the time of the Attack on Pearl Harbor, Saga was based at Guangdong and was assigned to the Japanese invasion force for the Battle of Hong Kong, where she was based afterwards. She was sunk by a sea mine on 26 September 1944 off Hong Kong, and later refloated and towed back to Hong Kong for repairs. On 22 January 1945, while still in dock for repairs, she was destroyed during an air raid, probably by United States Army Air Forces 14th Air Force Consolidated B-24 Liberators. She was struck from the navy list on 20 March 1945.
