= SS Malama =

Cargo Ship

History

United States
- Name: Milwaukee Bridge (1919–1927); Malama (1927–1942)
- Namesake: Milwaukee Bridge Co.
- Owner: USSB (1919–1927); Matson Navigation Co. (1927–1942)
- Operator: Kerr Steamship Company (1919); Moore, McCormack & Co. (1920–1921); Matson Navigation Co. (1927–1941); United States Army (Nov. 1941—Jan. 1942)
- Port of registry: Newark (1919–1927); San Francisco (1927–1942)
- Ordered: 14 September 1917
- Builder: Submarine Boat Company, Newark
- Yard number: 17
- Laid down: 21 March 1918
- Launched: 2 March 1919
- Sponsored by: Miss Ruth Trimborn
- Completed: May 1919
- Maiden voyage: 19 June 1919
- In service: 21 May 1919
- Identification: US official number 217928; code letters: LQTN (1919–1933); call sign: KIBF (1934–1942)
- Fate: Scuttled by crew, 1 January 1942

General characteristics
- Class & type: Design 1023 cargo ship
- Tonnage: 3,275 GRT; 5,191 DWT; 1,996 NRT
- Length: 324.0 ft (98.8 m) registry length
- Beam: 46.2 ft (14.1 m)
- Draft: 22 ft 9 1/2 in (6.947 m) (loaded)
- Depth: 25.0 ft (7.6 m)
- Decks: 1
- Installed power: 1,500 shp, 386 Nhp
- Propulsion: Westinghouse Electric steam turbine double reduction geared to one screw
- Speed: 10 1/2 knots (19.4 km/h; 12.1 mph)
- Range: 10,080 nmi (18,670 km; 11,600 mi)

Milwaukee Bridge was a steam cargo ship built in 1918–1919 by Submarine Boat Company of Newark for the United States Shipping Board (USSB) as part of the wartime shipbuilding program of the Emergency Fleet Corporation (EFC) to restore the nation's Merchant Marine. The vessel was first briefly employed on the East Coast to United Kingdom route in the first two years of her career before being laid up at the end of 1921. In 1927 she was acquired by Matson Navigation Company to operate between California and Hawaii and renamed Malama. On New Year's Day 1942 while en route to New Zealand under U.S. Army operation with cargo of military supplies she was discovered by Japanese merchant raiders and was scuttled by her crew to prevent capture.

== Design and construction ==
After the United States entry into World War I, a large shipbuilding program was undertaken to restore and enhance shipping capabilities both of the United States and its Allies. As part of this program, EFC placed orders with nation's shipyards for a large number of vessels of standard designs. Design 1023 cargo ship was a standard cargo ship of about 5,300 tons deadweight designed by Submarine Boat Corp. and adopted by USSB.

Milwaukee Bridge was part of the first order for 50 vessels placed by USSB with Submarine Boat Corp. on 14 September 1917. The ship was laid down at the shipbuilder's yard on 21 March 1918 (yard number 17) and launched on 2 March 1919, with Miss Ruth Trimborn, daughter of C. Trimborn president of the Milwaukee Bridge Company of Milwaukee, being the sponsor. The ship was named after Milwaukee Bridge Co., one of many providers of fabricated steel for the shipyard.

Similar to all vessels of this class the ship had three islands and one main deck, had machinery situated amidships and had four main holds, both fore and aft, which allowed for the carriage of variety of goods and merchandise. The vessel also possessed all the modern machinery for quick loading and unloading of cargo from five large hatches, including ten winches and ten booms. She was also equipped with wireless apparatus and had electrical lights installed along the deck.

As built, the ship was 324.0 feet (98.8 m) long (between perpendiculars) and 46.2 feet (14.1 m) abeam and had a depth of 25.0 feet (7.6 m). Milwaukee Bridge was originally assessed at 3,275 GRT and 1,996 NRT and had deadweight of about 5,200. The vessel had a steel hull with double bottom throughout and a single turbine rated at 1,500 shp, double reduction geared to a single screw propeller, that moved the ship at up to 10 1/2 knots (12.1 mph; 19.4 km/h). The steam for the engine was supplied by two Babcock & Wilcox Water Tube boilers fitted for oil fuel.

Following successful completion of trials, the freighter was inspected by the USSB representatives and officially accepted by them on 21 May 1919.

== Operational history ==
Following acceptance by the Shipping Board, Milwaukee Bridge was allocated to Kerr Steamship Company to operate on their Mediterranean and South American routes. The vessel loaded full cargo of sugar in New York and sailed out on her maiden voyage on 19 June 1919 bound for Lisbon, Bilbao and Santander. After an uneventful and quick journey she arrived at Lisbon on July 3 and proceeded to visit the remaining destinations. The vessel sailed from Bilbao on her return trip on July 24 and safely reached New York on August 8, thus successfully completing her maiden trip. On her next trip Milwaukee Bridge departed Newport News on September 16 carrying large cargo of flour and other merchandise, including drums of sulfuric acid, to multiple South American ports such as Santos, Florianópolis and Buenos-Aires. While en route the sulfuric acid drums stored as deck load started leaking causing damage to the vessel's deck and the cargo of flour in the holds underneath forcing the crew to throw some of the drums overboard. Following this trip and return to New York on 5 January 1920, the vessel was allocated to Moore, McCormack & Co. to serve their United Kingdom and Ireland routes. The vessel cleared out loaded with general cargo from New York on her first trip under new management on 6 February 1920 bound for Belfast, Cork and Dublin. On her departure back to North America, she was forced to put in into Queenstown with engine problems on March 14 and was able to depart ten days later after repairs were effected. The freighter continued sailing to Irish destinations through the end of 1920 before being shifted to serve various ports on the Baltic Sea in January 1921. On one of such journeys in August 1921 she went aground near Hals while attempting to navigate to Aalborg. Milwaukee Bridge was able to refloat herself but had to unload part of her cargo into lighters before she could re-enter the harbor. After conducting one more trip and returning to New York on October 6, Milwaukee Bridge was returned to the Shipping Board and was subsequently laid up together with many other vessels due to overabundance of available tonnage and scarcity of cargo, and remained berthed at the Staten Island anchorage for almost six years.

In mid-March 1927 it was reported that Milwaukee Bridge was purchased for $30,000 in cash by Matson Navigation Company and soon departed the East Coast for California in ballast where the ship were to enter the Hawaiian trade. After passing through the Panama Canal on 2–3 May 1927, the vessel reached San Francisco about fifteen days later. Once there, the ship was renamed Malama after a district of the Big Island near Puna. The freighter cleared out from San Francisco on her first West Coast voyage on 31 May 1927 to load cargo at Portland and Astoria, and after loading nearly 161,000 feet of lumber as well as other general cargo, returned to California two weeks later to pick up a pineapple barge destined for Inter-Island Steam Navigation Company in Hawaii. After an uneventful journey, Malama arrived at Honolulu on June 25. The ship then proceeded to Mahukona where she loaded all available sugar and sailed back for San Francisco on July 8, arriving there on July 19 and successfully concluding her first trip under new ownership. Following this trip, Malama was put into local shipyard for refitting and overhaul as required by the terms of sale. The work took about six month to finish, and the ship returned to service in February 1928. Upon return, Malama entered triangular freight route carrying lumber and other general cargo from the Puget Sound ports such as Bellingham, Gray's Harbor and Coos Bay to various Hawaiian destinations. On the return leg of her trips she was carrying mostly sugar and occasionally other tropical fruits such as pineapples and coconuts to San Francisco. She stayed in this service through the end of 1929. In early part of 1930 she was switched temporarily into direct San Francisco to Hawaii route, transporting general cargo from California and bringing back the same tropical cargoes. After seven months, Malama reentered the lumber trade in August 1930 bringing over a million feet of lumber to Hawaii on her first trip. However, after only one more trip Matson Navigation unexpectedly removed the freighter from service in September 1930. The vessel remained berthed in San Francisco until early May 1932 when she was temporarily brought back into service to take over another Matson's ship route. Malama arrived at Honolulu at the end of May bringing general cargo, automobiles, fuel oil and other merchandise. After conducting one more trip, Malama again was withdrawn from service and laid up in August 1932.

The freighter remained out of service for nearly four years and was finally reactivated in April 1936 when she was put into drydock for some upgrades before returning to service. After finishing the upgrades, Malama re-entered the same triangular freight route it served before, carrying lumber from the Pacific Northwest to Hawaii and returning to San Francisco with sugar and molasses. Malama continued serving this general route until the end of 1941. In July 1941 while shifting berths during loading in foggy weather Malama went aground on one of the sandspits at the entrance to the Humboldt Bay. The U.S. Coast Guard cutter Shawnee was dispatched to her rescue but could not refloat her immediately requiring some of the lumber cargo to be removed. After lighting the vessel was successfully refloated sustaining no apparent damage and could continue her journey.

With mounting tensions between the United States and Japan in summer 1941 and vulnerability and insufficiency of the Philippines defenses forced the War Department to quickly escalate shipments of war supplies, personnel and equipment to the Philippine Islands. In early November 1941 the United States Army requisitioned several cargo vessels plying their trade on the West Coast, including Malama, to transport the required personnel and equipment to Manila. At the time of the announcement, Malama was on one of her regular trips unloading her cargo in various ports of Hawaiian Islands. She arrived in San Francisco on November 20 and upon unloading was delivered to the Maritime Commission on 25 November 1941 who in turn allocated the ship at the same time to the War Department for Army operation under a standard Time Form Charter Agreement.

=== Sinking ===
After being transferred to the Army control, Malama loaded full cargo of war materiel consisting of various Army stores, 25 tons of Signal Corps equipment, including seven mobile radar sets SCR-270, 116 trucks and trailers, aircraft parts as well as significant amounts of chemical warfare supplies. She sailed out from San Francisco on 29 November 1941 bound for the Philippines via Honolulu. The vessel was under command of captain Malcolm R. Peters, had a crew of thirty three and in addition carried five Army radar technicians. Following an uneventful trip Malama reached Honolulu at 08:30 on December 8 where she was ordered to take refuge and await further orders. After about a week's wait the Navy started releasing all the ships for voyages and rerouting them if necessary. Malama was released at 12:00 noon on December 16 and re-routed to Wellington. The freighter managed to make it safely through the Japanese submarine patrols around the Hawaii but on 31 December 1941 she was spotted by a Kawanishi E7K2 "Alf" floatplane from the armed merchant cruiser Aikoku Maru which was operating in Southern Pacific together with her sister ship Hōkoku Maru. The floatplane circled the ship several times but eventually departed the area without attacking her. This floatplane, however, never returned to her mother ship and the contact with the freighter was temporarily lost. Next day another E7K2 from the Hōkoku Maru was launched to search for the missing floatplane and the pilot and in the process reestablished contact with the American vessel. Malama sent out a message that she was being followed by an unknown plane, giving her position as 26°39′S 151°24′W. This message was picked up by a radio station in Papeete. The Japanese plane then strafed the freighter and ordered her to stop. Captain Peters complied and gave an order to abandon the ship, while Malama's radio operator sent out another message about the incident, which was picked up by a radio station in Raratonga. The plane then departed the area and returned several hours later armed with bombs, and with both merchant raiders following closely behind. Not wanting the ship's cargo seized, the captain also ordered that the vessel be scuttled which was done by dismantling her condensers allowing seawater to enter the hold. After the crew safely left the ship in two lifeboats, E7K2 proceeded to drop several bombs hitting the vessel and setting her ablaze. Both raiders soon arrived at the scene to pick up the survivors as Malama had already sunk by then. After ending their patrol, both merchant raiders returned to Japan in early February where an entire crew was disembarked. In June 1942 it was reported that Malama's crew was interned in Shanghai where they remained through the end of the war.

== Bibliography ==
- McKellar, Norman L. "Steel Shipbuilding under the U. S. Shipping Board, 1917-1921, Part III, Contract Steel Ships" (PDF). Steel Shipbuilding under the U. S. Shipping Board, 1917-1921. ShipScribe.
