= SS Agios Georgios IV =

Greek-owned World War II cargo steamship

History

Greece
- Name: Agios Georgios IV
- Namesake: Saint George
- Owner: NG Nicolaou
- Operator: G Nicolaou (Hellas) Ltd
- Port of registry: Piraeus
- Builder: Bartram & Sons, Sunderland
- Yard number: 279
- Launched: 14 April 1938
- Completed: July 1938
- Identification: call sign SVXM
- Fate: sunk by gunfire, 8 June 1942

General characteristics
- Type: cargo ship
- Tonnage: 4,847 GRT, 2,916 NRT
- Length: 417.9 ft (127.4 m)
- Beam: 56.6 ft (17.3 m)
- Draught: 25 ft 0 3/4 in (7.6 m)
- Depth: 24.8 ft (7.6 m)
- Decks: 1
- Installed power: 365 NHP
- Propulsion: 1 × screw; 1 × compound steam engine via reduction gearing, 1 × steam turbine via double-reduction gearing
- Sensors & processing systems: wireless direction finding

SS Agios Georgios IV was a Greek-owned cargo steamship that was built in England in 1938 and sunk by a Japanese submarine in the Indian Ocean in 1942. Agios Georgios IV was one of a relatively small number of steamships that had White combination engines. This was a combination of a high-speed four-cylinder compound steam engine that drove the propeller shaft via single-reduction gearing, with an exhaust steam turbine that drove the same shaft via double-reduction gearing.

== Building ==
In 1936 and 1937 Bartram & Sons in Sunderland built a set of six tramp steamships for Welsh shipowners, all to the same dimensions. All six ships had the same White's propulsion system, with a compound engine, an exhaust turbine, and reduction gearing for both engines. Nailsea Court, Llanashe and Nailsea Meadow were launched in 1936. Llandaff, Nailsea Moor and Nailsea Manor were launched in 1937.

Bartram's then built Agios Nicolaos IV to the same design, as yard number 279. She was launched on 14 April 1938 and completed that July. Her registered length was 417.9 ft (127.4 m), her beam was 56.6 ft (17.3 m) and her depth was 24.8 ft (7.6 m). Her tonnages were 4,847 GRT and 2,916 NRT. The combined rating of her four-cylinder compound engine and exhaust steam turbine was 365 NHP.

NG Nicolaou owned Agios Nicolaos IV and G Nicolaou (Hellas) Ltd managed her. She was registered in Piraeus. Her wireless telegraph call sign was SVXM.

== Loss ==
In the Second World War Greece was neutral until Italy tried to invade it in October 1940. In January 1941 Agios Georgios IV sailed from Piraeus to Port Said in Convoy AS 11, which comprised ten Greek, British, Dutch and Egyptian merchant ships. The convoy seems to have lacked an escort, but all ten ships arrived safely.

In June 1942 Agios Georgios IV was in passage between Aden and Table Bay. On 8 June, as she steamed through the Mozambique Channel, Japanese submarine I-16 sank her at position 16°12′S 41°00′E with its 140 mm deck gun. The attack killed seven of Agios Georgios IV's crew: the Chief Officer, Second Officer, steward, two able seamen and two stokers.

== Bibliography ==
- Hardy, AC (1954) [1948]. Modern Marine Engineering. Vol. I (revised ed.). London: Caxton Publishing.
- Lloyd's Register of Shipping (PDF). Vol. II.–Steamers and Motorships of 300 tons gross and over. London: Lloyd's Register of Shipping. 1939 – via Southampton City Council.
