= Gokoku Maru =

Second world war Japanese warship

Gokoku Maru (護國丸) was an armed merchant cruiser of the Imperial Japanese Navy in World War II, the last ship of the Hōkoku Maru-class ocean liners. The ship entered service in 1942 and was employed mainly as a troop transport. She came under attack several times during her service career, and was sunk in a submarine attack in November 1944.

== Design ==
Gokoku Maru was laid down at the Tama shipyard in Okayama Prefecture prior to the outbreak of World War II. She was designed as a cargo liner for the Osaka Shosen Lines's regularly scheduled services between Japan and Africa. She was launched in April 1942 and completed in September of that year. During the building process, she was requisitioned by the Imperial Japanese Navy (in July 1942) and converted into an armed merchant cruiser. She was also outfitted as a submarine tender, but was employed mainly as a transport.

== Service history ==
After commissioning in September 1942, Gokoku Maru was assigned to a Singapore naval base. In December 1942 as part of Operation Hei-Go, she transported troops and supplies to Madang, New Guinea. During this period, she was attacked by the U.S. submarine USS Albacore. Albacore hit her escort, the cruiser Tenryū, and Gokoku Maru herself was bombed by a U.S. aircraft.

In January 1943, en route to Palau, she was hit by a torpedo from the submarine USS Searaven, but it turned out to be a dud. In February, as part of Operation Hinoe-Go 3, she was fired on by USS Runner, but suffered no hits. In July, she was involved in a collision and was forced to return to Japan for repairs. In October, Gokoku Maru was part of operation Tei-Go 4, taking reinforcements from China to the Pacific theater. The convoy came under attack by a pack of three submarines by USS Cero; Gokoku Maru was fired on by USS Shad, but suffered no damage. The following month she was bombed by U.S. aircraft near Rabaul, but again escaped damage. In November, she returned to Japan for a refit, but was again attacked, this time by USS Gurnard, and suffered two torpedo hits. Gokoku Maru survived, but spent the next six months under repair at Yokohama.

In June 1944, she returned to service with convoy Hi-67. This convoy was attacked by USS Bang, with two ships damaged, but Gokoku Maru escaped harm. In July, near Davao, she was torpedoed by USS Dace, scoring two hits, but both failed to explode. In August, she was part of convoy Hi-72 to Manila, returning in September. During this voyage, she was bombed and suffered one hit.

=== Sinking ===
After temporary repairs, Gokoku Maru continued to operate, but in November, while en route to Sasebo for repair, she was found by USS Barb. She was hit by two torpedoes and badly damaged. When she tried to escape, Gokoku Maru was hit again, and this time the damage was fatal; she sank on 10 November 1944 off Koshiki Jima, Kyushu, Japan, with the loss of 326 crew and passengers.
