= MV Ondina =

Oil tanker built in 1939

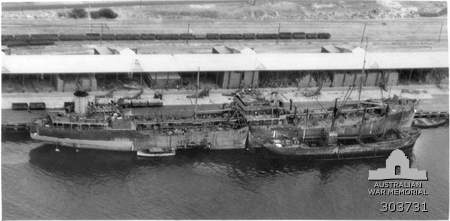
- Aerial starboard side view of the Ondina in 1943

History

Netherlands
- Name: Ondina
- Owner: Royal Dutch Shell
- Builder: NDSM, Amsterdam, Netherlands
- Launched: 29 April 1939
- Completed: 1 August 1939
- Fate: Broken up at Hong Kong, 1959

General characteristics
- Type: Oil tanker
- Tonnage: 6,341 GRT; 9,070 DWT
- Length: 130.49 m (428 ft 1 in)
- Beam: 16.62 m (54 ft 6 in)
- Draught: 6.40 m (21 ft 0 in)
- Propulsion: 1 Werkspoor 6-cylinder diesel engine; 2,800 hp (2,100 kW)
- Notes: 12 knots (22 km/h; 14 mph)

MV Ondina was an oil tanker built in 1939 and owned by Royal Dutch Shell; initially operated by the La Corona shipping company. In November 1942, during the Second World War, it was attacked in the Indian Ocean by two Japanese commerce raiders, one of which (the Hōkoku Maru) was sunk possibly by a shell fired by the Ondina. After the war it continued operating until decommissioned and broken up in 1959.

== Description ==
Measuring 9,070 DWT, Ondina was 130.49 metres (428 ft 1 in) long with a beam of 16.62 metres (54 ft 6 in). The vessel had a draught of 6.4 metres (21 ft 0 in). Fitted with a single Werkspoor six-cylinder diesel engine that was capable of generating 2,800 horsepower (2,100 kW), the ship had a top speed of 12 knots (22 km/h; 14 mph). Its armament consisted of a single 102-millimetre (4 in) quick-firing gun and several machine guns.

== Career ==
Launched in April 1939, Ondina was built at the NDSM shipyard in Amsterdam, in the Netherlands. Completed in August 1939, prior to the Second World War the vessel sailed for La Corona, a subsidiary of the Royal Dutch Shell company.

=== Second World War ===
In November 1942, Ondina took part in the battle against the Japanese auxiliary cruisers and raiders Aikoku Maru and Hōkoku Maru where it was damaged; after which it was temporarily repaired and then sent to Exmouth Gulf in Western Australia where she was stationed from 22 June 1943 supplying fuel to US submarines. On 1 September 1943 the Ondina also supplied fuel to the ship MV Krait then taking part in Operation Jaywick, the raid on Singapore. At the end of 1943 the ship was sent to the US for repairs at Tampa, sailing via Melbourne, Balboa, Panama Canal and Galveston.

==== Action against Japanese raiders ====
On 11 November 1942, Ondina was sailing escorted by HMIS Bengal, a Bathurst-class corvette, to the southwest of Cocos Islands in the Indian Ocean, when the Japanese commerce raiders Aikoku Maru and Hōkoku Maru attacked them. The Japanese ships were each armed with eight 5.5-inch (140 mm) guns, while Ondina had only a 102 mm gun and Bengal a single 4-inch weapon. Both Allied ships scored hits on the Hōkoku Maru which blew up and sank. Ondina was so damaged in the action that the captain ordered "abandon ship", after which he died. With the tanker's crew in lifeboats, Aikoku Maru killed some with machine-gun fire, rescued the majority of the crew of the sunken Hōkoku Maru, and retired. Ondina did not sink, so its crew reboarded, repaired some of the damage, and reached port safely.

=== Postwar ===
Ondina was decommissioned and scrapped in 1959, at Hong Kong.

== See also ==
- Japanese raiders in the Indian Ocean
