= HMIS Bengal =

Bathurst-class corvette

History

India
- Name: Bengal
- Namesake: Bengal
- Ordered: 24 September 1940
- Builder: Cockatoo Docks and Engineering Company
- Laid down: 3 December 1941
- Launched: 28 May 1942
- Commissioned: 8 August 1942
- Decommissioned: 1960
- Fate: Scrapped 1960

General characteristics
- Class & type: Bathurst-class corvette
- Displacement: 650 tons (standard); 1,025 tons (full load)
- Length: 186 ft (57 m)
- Beam: 31 ft (9.4 m)
- Draught: 8.5 ft (2.6 m)
- Propulsion: Triple expansion engine, 2 shafts, 2,000 hp (1,500 kW)
- Speed: 15 knots (28 km/h; 17 mph) at 1,750 hp
- Complement: 85
- Armament: 1 × 4-inch Mk XIX gun; 3 × 20 mm Oerlikon guns; Machine guns; Depth charge chutes and throwers

HMIS Bengal (J243) was a Bathurst-class corvette of the Royal Indian Navy (RIN) which served during the Second World War.

== History ==
HMIS Bengal was ordered from Cockatoo Docks and Engineering Company, Australia, for the Royal Indian Navy in 1940. She was commissioned into the RIN in 1942.

=== Operations in the Second World War ===
HMIS Bengal was a part of the Eastern Fleet during the Second World War and escorted numerous convoys between 1942 and 1945.

On 11 November 1942, Bengal was escorting the Dutch tanker Ondina to the southwest of Cocos Islands in the Indian Ocean. Two Japanese commerce raiders armed with 5.5-inch (140 mm) guns attacked Ondina. Bengal fired her single 4-inch (100 mm) gun and Ondina fired her 4-inch (102 mm) gun and both scored hits on Hōkoku Maru, which shortly blew up and sank. Both Ondina and Bengal ran out of ammunition. Ondina was badly damaged by shellfire and torpedoes, and her captain signaled "abandon ship" before he died. Bengal, seeing there was nothing more she could do, sailed away.

The other raider, Aikoku Maru, machine-gunned the lifeboats with Ondina's crew aboard, causing some casualties, picked up the survivors from Hōkoku Maru and sailed off, believing that Ondina was sinking. Ondina's surviving crew re-boarded their ship, put out the fires and sailed to Freemantle. Bengal, too, reached port safely.
