= SS Supetar =

Yugoslavian Cargo ship

History

Yugoslavia
- Name: (United Kingdom) Caterino (1909-1921); (Greece) Maria N. Roussos (1921-1935); (Kingdom of Yugoslavia) Supetar (1935-1942)
- Owner: Petrinovic & Co.
- Port of registry: (Kingdom of Yugoslavia) Split, Yugoslavia
- Builder: William Gray & Co. Ltd.
- Yard number: 765
- Launched: 20 May 1909
- Completed: 1909
- Identification: YTFO
- Fate: Torpedoed and sunk 12 June 1942

General characteristics
- Type: Cargo ship
- Tonnage: 3,748 GRT
- Length: 111.1 metres (364 ft 6 in)
- Beam: 15.5 metres (50 ft 10 in)
- Depth: 7 metres (23 ft 0 in)
- Installed power: 1 x 3-cyl. triple expansion engine
- Propulsion: Screw propeller
- Speed: 8.5 knots
- Crew: 35

SS Supetar was a Yugoslavian Cargo ship that was torpedoed and sunk by the Japanese submarine I-16 on 12 June 1942 in the Indian Ocean, 100 nautical miles (190 km) south of Beira, Mozambique.

== Construction ==
Supetar was built at the William Gray & Co. Ltd. shipyard in West Hartlepool, County Durham, North East England in 1909. where she was launched and completed that same year. The ship was 111.1 metres (364 ft 6 in) long, had a beam of 15.5 metres (50 ft 10 in) and a depth of 7 metres (23 ft 0 in). She was assessed at 3,748 GRT and had 1 x 3-cyl. triple expansion engine driving a single screw propeller. The ship could reach a maximum speed of 8.5 knots.

== Sinking ==
Supetar was torpedoed and sunk by the Japanese submarine I-16 on 12 June 1942 in the Indian Ocean, 100 nautical miles (190 km) south of Beira, Mozambique. All crew on board at the time of the sinking survived.
