= Hōkoku Maru =

Armed merchant cruiser of the Imperial Japanese Navy

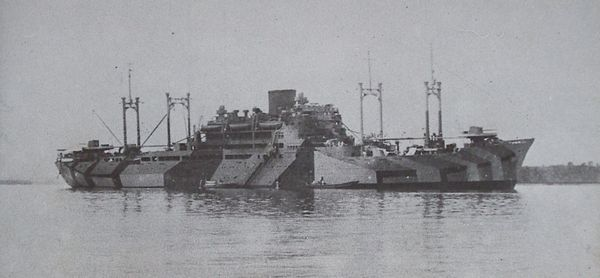
- Hōkoku Maru in wartime camouflage

History

Japan
- Name: Hōkoku Maru
- Owner: Osaka Syōsen KK
- Operator: (Empire of Japan) Imperial Japanese Navy
- Port of registry: (Japan) Osaka
- Builder: Tama Shipbuilding Co Ltd
- Laid down: 18 August 1938
- Launched: 5 July 1939
- Completed: 15 June 1940
- Acquired: requisitioned 29 August 1941
- Commissioned: into Japanese Navy, 20 September 1941
- Maiden voyage: Kobe – Dairen
- Identification: call sign JCSN
- Fate: Sunk by enemy action, 7 November 1942

General characteristics
- Class & type: Hōkoku Maru-class ocean liner
- Tonnage: 10,439 GRT, 6,159 NRT
- Length: 499.5 ft (152.2 m)
- Beam: 66.3 ft (20.2 m)
- Depth: 40.7 ft (12.4 m)
- Decks: 3
- Installed power: 2,490 NHP
- Propulsion: 2 × screws; 2 × two-stroke diesel engines
- Speed: 20.9 knots (38.7 km/h)
- Capacity: as passenger liner: 400 × first class; 48 × special-third class; 404 × third class
- Crew: 150
- Sensors & processing systems: wireless direction finding; echo sounding device; gyrocompass
- Armament: as armed merchant cruiser: 8 × 150 mm (5.9 in) L/40 guns; 2 × 76.2 mm (3.00 in) L/40 guns; 4 × 530 mm (21 in) torpedo tubes
- Aircraft carried: 2 × Kawanishi E7K seaplanes

Hōkoku Maru (報國丸) was an Hōkoku Maru-class ocean liner that served as an armed merchant cruiser in the Second World War. She was launched in 1939 and completed in 1940 for Osaka Shosen Lines.

In 1941 she was commissioned into the Imperial Japanese Navy. She served as a commerce raider and submarine tender. Two Allied naval ships sank her in a naval engagement in 1942.

== Building ==
Hōkoku Maru was designed as a cargo liner for Shosen Line's scheduled services to South America. She was laid down at the Tama shipyard in Okayama Prefecture on 18 August 1938. She was launched on 5 July 1939 and completed on 22 June 1940.

Designed as a luxury ocean liner, she had a luxury suite of rooms called the Nara Suite after the city of that name. However, the Japanese admiralty influenced the design of the Hōkoku Maru-class, to make them suitable for use as troop ships. The Japanese government provided large subsidies for such dual-purpose designs from 1936 onwards.

Hōkoku Maru's registered length was 499.5 ft (152.2 m), her beam was 66.3 ft (20.2 m) and her depth was 40.7 ft (12.4 m). Her tonnages were 10,439 GRT and 6,159 NRT. She had two screws, each powered by a 12-cylinder, single-acting, two-stroke diesel engine. Between them her two engines were rated at 2,490 NHP, and they gave her a speed of 20.9 knots (38.7 km/h).

== Civilian career ==
Hōkoku Maru was registered in Osaka. Her call sign was JCSN.

Instead of running between Japan and South America, Hōkoku Maru mostly operated between Kobe in Japan and Dairen in the Japanese puppet state of Manchukuo, with some calls at Moji, Yokohama and Nagoya. Her only recorded voyage to South America started from Moji on 27 July 1940. She then resumed her route between Dairen and Kobe.

== Conversion ==
On 29 August 1941 the Japanese Navy requisitioned Hōkoku Maru. The Mitsubishi Heavy Industries shipyard at Kobe armed her with four 15 cm/50 41st Year Type guns, two QF 12 pounder 12 cwt naval guns, two Type 93 13.2-mm machine guns and two twin-mount 533-millimetre (21 in) torpedo tubes. In October 1941 she was fitted with 900mm and 1,100mm searchlights and a boom for handling a Kawanishi E7K floatplane, with a second aircraft as a spare.

Despite her intended role as a commerce raider, little attempt was made to disguise Hōkoku Maru as a merchant ship. Her guns were fitted with gun-shields and were left in open sight, and she was painted in two-tone naval camouflage.

== Naval career ==
Hōkoku Maru was commissioned into the Japanese Navy on 20 September 1941 under the command of Captain Aihara Aritaka.

On 15 November 1941 Hōkoku Maru and her sister ship Aikoku Maru, sailed for Jaluit in preparation for the opening of hostilities against the United States. On 7 December 1941 the two ships were in the Tuamotu Archipelago at the start of a two-month raiding voyage that sank two Allied merchant ships: St Vincent off Pitcairn Island and Malama near the Cook Islands, before returning to Japan in February 1942.

In Japan, Hōkoku Maru was refitted, and was re-armed with 8 x 140mm (5.5 inch) guns. She was also outfitted as a submarine tender to support operations by the IJN's 8th Submarine Squadron off East Africa.

In May 1942, Hōkoku Maru, again with Aikoku Maru, sailed for Singapore, thence to the Indian Ocean. There they captured the Dutch tanker Genota south of Diego-Suarez, Madagascar, and sank the British cargo ship Elysia south of the Mozambique Channel, before re-arming the submarines of the 8th Submarine Squadron off the east coast of Africa.

In July 1942 the two raiders captured the New Zealand cargo ship Hauraki, which they sent to Singapore under a prize crew. Returning to Singapore, Hōkoku Maru was re-equipped with two Aichi E13A (Allied reporting name "Jake") floatplanes, and an experimental two-tone dazzle camouflage scheme.

In November 1942 Hōkoku Maru, again in company with Aikoku Maru, left Singapore for the Indian Ocean, on what would be her last raiding voyage.

== Loss ==
On 7 November 1942, Hōkoku Maru and Aikoku Maru passed through the Sunda Strait into the Indian Ocean. Four days later, on 11 November 1942, they encountered the Dutch armed tanker Ondina, escorted by the Royal Indian Navy corvette HMIS Bengal off the Cocos (Keeling) Islands. As Hōkoku Maru engaged, Bengal and Ondina returned fire, and a shell, probably from Ondina's single 4-inch (102 mm) gun, hit Hōkoku Maru's starboard torpedo mount, causing an explosion and uncontrollable fire which spread to the aft magazine. After a series of explosions, Hōkoku Maru sank just two hours after the action commenced. Aikoku Maru rescued 278 of her crew. Both Ondina and Bengal escaped.

== Bibliography ==
- Gardiner, Robert; Chesneau, Roger, eds. (1980). Conway's All The World's Fighting Ships 1922–1946. London: Conway Maritime Press. ISBN 0-85177-146-7. }
- Lloyd's Register of Shipping (1941) Volume II: Steamers and Motorships of 300 Tons Gross and Over. London, Lloyd's Register of Shipping, via Southampton City Council
