= Aikoku Maru (1940) =

Armed merchant cruiser of the Imperial Japanese Navy

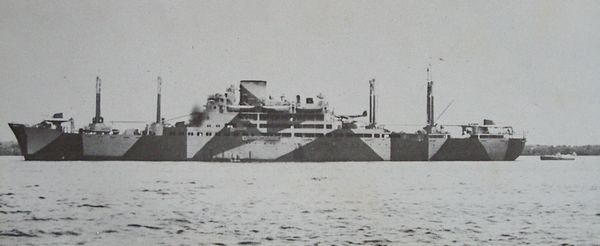
- Aikoku Maru in Singapore in 1942

History

Empire of Japan
- Name: Aikoku Maru
- Ordered: 1937 fiscal year
- Builder: Mitsui Engineering & Shipbuilding, Tamano, Okayama
- Laid down: 29 December 1938
- Launched: 25 April 1940
- Completed: 31 August 1941
- Stricken: 31 March 1944
- Fate: Sunk by air attack, 16 February 1944

General characteristics
- Type: Armed merchant cruiser
- Tonnage: 10,438 GRT
- Length: 160.8 m (527 ft 7 in) w/l
- Beam: 20.2 m (66 ft 3 in)
- Draught: 8.8 m (28 ft 10 in)
- Propulsion: 2 × Mitsui B&W diesel engines; 13,000 shp (9,700 kW)
- Speed: 20.9 knots (38.7 km/h; 24.1 mph)
- Complement: 133
- Armament: 4 × 15 cm/50 41st Year Type guns; 2 × 8 cm/40 3rd Year Type naval guns; 2 × 2 Type 93 13.2-mm machine guns; 2 × 2 533 mm (21.0 in) torpedo tubes
- Aircraft carried: 1 × Kawanishi E7K floatplane

General characteristics (after 1942)
- Armament: 8 × 14 cm/50 3rd Year Type naval guns; 2 × 8 cm/40 3rd Year Type naval guns; 2 × 2 Type 96 25 mm AA guns; 2 × 2 Type 93 13.2 mm machine guns; 2 × 2 533 mm (21.0 in) torpedo tubes
- Aircraft carried: 2 × Aichi E13A floatplanes

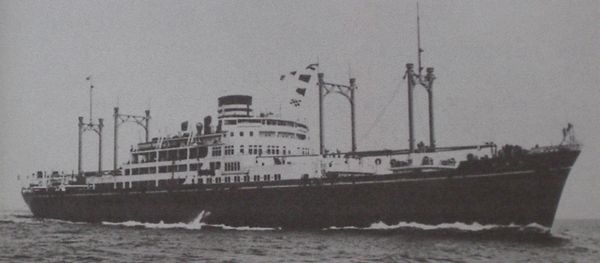
Aikoku Maru in 1941 in Mitsui livery

Aikoku Maru (愛国丸) was an armed merchant cruiser of the Imperial Japanese Navy in World War II. The ship entered service in 1940, the ship was later converted to an ammunition ship. She was sunk in February 1944 during Operation Hailstone.

== Design ==
Aikoku Maru was laid down at the Mitsui Tamano shipyards in Okayama Prefecture on 29 December 1938. The vessel measured 10,438 gross register tons, with a length of 160.8 m (527 ft 7 in). Powered by two Mitsui B&W diesel engines with 13,000 shp (9,700 kW) driving twin screws, she was capable of 20.9 knots (38.7 km/h; 24.1 mph). The vessel was launched on 25 April 1940, and was named Aikoku Maru at that time.

She was designed to be a combined passenger liner / cargo vessel for the Osaka Shosen Lines's regularly scheduled services to South America. Provisionally named Kyoto, the design for the new vessel was to have boasted of luxurious suite rooms. The vessel was built with large government subsidies provided from 1936 to encourage the production of large, high-speed transports and tankers, which could be quickly converted to military use in times of conflict.

Although ostensibly a luxury ocean liner, the military had a say in the design of Aikoku Maru with an eye towards its future use as a troop transport. Provision was made for landing craft and for the anchoring of naval artillery.

== Operational history ==
Immediately on completion on 31 August 1941, Aikoku Maru was officially requisitioned by the Imperial Japanese Navy. She was converted into an armed merchant cruiser from 5 September while still at Tamano, with the installation of four 15 cm/50 41st Year Type guns, two QF 12 pounder 12 cwt naval guns, two Type 93 13.2 mm machine guns and two twin-mount 533 mm (21 in) torpedo tubes. She was also fitted with powerful searchlights and boom for handling a Kawanishi E7K float plane (with one additional aircraft as a spare).

=== As an auxiliary cruiser and submarine tender ===
On 15 October 1941, the 24th Raider Squadron (CruDiv24), consisting of Aikoku Maru, Hōkoku Maru, and Kiyosumi Maru was created under the Combined Fleet. Aikoku Maru and her sister ship Hōkoku Maru were forward deployed to Jaluit Atoll in the Marshall Islands at the end of November in preparation for the upcoming hostilities against the United States.

On 13 December 1941, Aikoku Maru and Hōkoku Maru sank SS Vincent (6,210 GWT), an American merchant vessel with a cargo of rice from Australia to Panama at 22°41′S 118°19′E. On 31 December 1941, the reconnaissance floatplane from Aikoku Maru spotted the American freighter Malama (3,275 GWT) en route to Wellington. The plane failed to return, and despite searching by both Japanese vessels, no trace was ever found of the missing aircraft. The second floatplane reacquired SS Malama south of the Cook Islands on 2 January 1942, and after making a strafing attack, ordered the ship to stop. After the crew of Malama abandoned ship, she was sunk at 26°39′S 151°24′W. Aside from the missing pilot, there were no casualties on either side, and the sortie was concluded on 20 January 1942. CruDiv24 returned to Hashirajima in February, after disembarking their 76 POWs at Oita.

On 14 February 1942, at Kure Naval Arsenal, Aikoku Maru's four 152 mm guns were replaced by eight 14 cm/50 3rd Year Type naval guns. She was also modified to carry submarine torpedoes in her hold to enable her to function as an auxiliary submarine tender. In this capacity, Aikoku Maru and Hōkoku Maru were deployed with the IJN 6th Fleet on 10 March to support submarine operations off the east coast of Africa and Mozambique. At the end of March, Aikoku Maru and Hōkoku Maru returned to Kure, where CruDiv24 was formally disbanded, and they are reassigned to Subron8, operating out of Penang from early April, supporting submarine operations in the western Indian Ocean. On 9 May, Aikoku Maru captured the Dutch tanker Genota (7,897 GWT) 480 miles (770 km) SSE of Diego Suarez, Madagascar. On 5 June, she sank SS Elysia (6,757 GWT), a British freighter carrying a number of Allied troops at 27°19′S 037°01′E. On 12 July, she captured the New Zealand registered freighter Hauraki near Ceylon. She placed a prize crew on board, but en route back to Japan, her New Zealander engine crew managed to sabotage the cargo and engine spares.

After repairs at Seletar Naval Base in Singapore, the floatplanes on Aikoku Maru were upgraded to two Aichi E13As, two dual Type 96 25 mm AT/AA Guns were added, and an additional 70 torpedoes were loaded. She continued to be based out of Penang until late August under the command of Tamotsu Oishi.

From September, Aikoku Maru was assigned to the IJN 8th Fleet and tasked with transporting the IJA 38th Infantry Division to Rabaul for the reinforcement of Guadalcanal. After accomplishing this mission by 10 October, her Commerce Raiding Unit was reactivated, and Aikoku Maru transited the Sunda Strait into the Indian Ocean on 7 November, together with Hōkoku Maru.

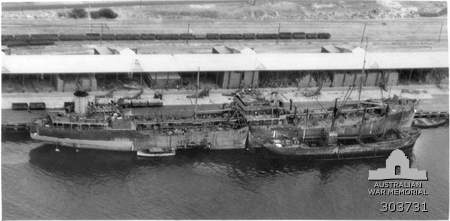
Ondina in 1943

On 11 November, the raiders attacked the Dutch tanker Ondina (6341 GWT), which was accompanied by the minesweeper HMIS Bengal, southwest of the Cocos Islands. Hōkoku Maru was closer and attacked first, but a shot from Ondina's 4-inch guns hit Hōkoku Maru's starboard torpedo tube, and detonated the torpedo. A fire broke out, which quickly raged out of control, causing the aft magazine to explode, sinking the vessel. Aikoku Maru then arrived, and drove off Bengal while Ondina also attempted to escape. Aikoku Maru scored six hits on Ondina with her guns, but her two torpedoes missed. However, with their ship damaged and out of ammunition, the crew of Ondina abandoned ship. Aikoku Maru fired on Ondina′s lifeboats, rescued 278 survivors of Hōkoku Maru, and returned to Penang, and from there to Singapore and Rabaul. Meanwhile, the crew of Ondina managed to re-enter their ship and effect repairs, escaping to Fremantle, Australia.

=== As a military transport ===
From 16 December 1942, Aikoku Maru was reassigned back to the IJN 8th Fleet, primarily as a military transport to support New Guinea operations, and her aircraft were disembarked. While unloading cargo at Madang on 18 December, she was attacked in an air raid by B-17 Flying Fortress bombers of the 43rd Bomb Group of the USAAF Fifth Air Force, but was not hit. She returned to Kure on 29 December 1942.

As part of "Operation C" (the Reinforcement of New Guinea), on 5 January 1943, Aikoku Maru loaded the IJAAF 209th Airfield Battalion, 14th Aerial Repair Shop and others, a total of 691 men plus 34 vehicles at Pusan in Korea, arriving at Rabaul on 14 January. She was then sent to Qingdao in Japanese-occupied China, arriving 24 January, and from there to Cebu (2 February) and Palau (7 February), where she loaded additional troops and cargo, delivering the reinforcements successfully to Wewak on 23 February. She returned to Kure on 5 April.

On 10 July 1943, as part of a convoy including the aircraft carrier Un'yō, Aokoku Maru was attacked by the submarine USS Halibut 170 nautical miles (310 km; 200 mi) north of Truk, which fired six torpedoes. One struck Aikoku Maru, causing moderate damage. On her return voyage, on 15 July, she was attacked again, this time by the submarine USS Tinosa, whose four torpedoes all missed. She returned to Kure on 2 September.

On 6 October, Aikoku Maru returned to Tamano for repairs and refitting with additional weaponry, which included two 152 mm guns and four twin-mount Type 96s. The refitting work was completed by 31 December 1943.

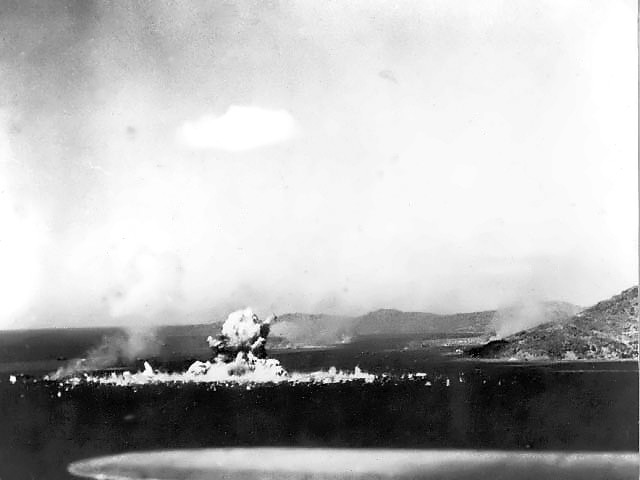
Japanese ammunition ship Aikoku Maru blowing up; the air crew which dropped the torpedo was missing and believed to have been caught in the explosion. 16 February 1944

On 21 January 1944, Aikoku Maru loaded the 629 men of the 66th Naval Guard Unit, with ammunition, supplies and construction materials. The convoy was attacked 300 nautical miles (560 km; 350 mi) northwest of Truk by the submarine USS Trigger, which sank the minelayer Nasami and transport Yasukuni Maru; however, Aikoku Maru was undamaged and reached Truk on 1 February. After making an abortive run to Brown Island, she returned to Truk on 16 February to find that most of the capital ships had evacuated the base in anticipation of an impending American attack. Aikoku Maru began loading ammunition and making preparations for departure to Rabaul, loading troops of the 1st Amphibious Brigade. However, before preparations were complete, Operation Hailstone began, with the US Navy Task Force 58 striking at Truk with 30 air strikes of over 150 aircraft each every hour for a period of two days. On the first day, 16 February 1944, Aikoku Maru was bombed by aircraft from the aircraft carrier USS Intrepid, with the first bomb exploding in the officer's wardroom, causing a fire. She was hit three more times in this attack, and was hit again in the second attack by a torpedo which set off the ammunition in her No.1 hold, shearing off the bow. Aikoku Maru sank in two minutes at 07°22′N 151°56′E, with most of the 945 crew and passengers. The aircraft which dropped the torpedo on Aikoku Maru- a TBM Avenger and its three-man crew from Torpedo Squadron 6 (VT6 Lieutenant James E. Bridges) were also destroyed in the explosion of the ship.

Aikoku Maru was removed from the navy list on 30 March 1944.

== Shipwreck ==
The wreck of Aikoku Maru is a popular scuba diving spot in the waters of Truk Lagoon, despite her depth of approximately 64 metres (210 ft). The wreck is upright, with the bridge at the 40 metres (130 ft) meter level and deck extending approximately 10 metres (33 ft) deeper. The remains of an anti-aircraft gun on top of the aft deckhouse is often photographed, as are the scattered dishes and kitchen utensils in her galley. Her wreck was first dived by the famous French explorer Jacques-Yves Cousteau in 1969, but she was not positively identified until later. In July 1980, a Japanese recovery team retrieved the remains of approximately 400 men who were killed in the attack, but the remains of hundreds more remain on site.

On 17 February 1994, a memorial monument was placed on Aikoku Maru′s deck at a depth of approximately 38 metres (125 ft). The monument was a joint project of the Chuuk Visitors Bureau, United States Air Force Civic Action Team (CAT), the Chuuk Atoll-based dive boat SS Thorfinn, and the Blue Lagoon dive shop at Chuuk Atoll.
