= Gorin =

Gorin may refer to:

- Furmint, white Hungarian wine grape also known as Görin or Gorin
- Gorin (air base), in Khabarovsk Krai, Russia
- Gorin (river), in Khabarovsk Krai, Russia
- Gorin (surname)
- Gorin v. United States, United States Supreme Court case involving Mikhail Gorin, a Soviet intelligence agent
- Gorin, Volgograd Oblast, rural locality in Russia
- South Gorin, Missouri, city in the United States
