= Cremation in Christianity =

Funeral practice

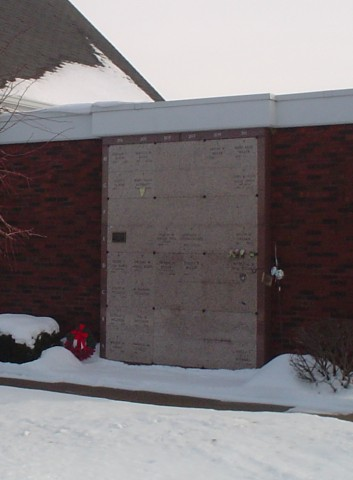
Columbarium niches built into the side of St. Joseph's Chapel Mausoleum at the Catholic Mount Olivet Cemetery in Key West, Iowa.

Cremation is a method used to dispose of the deceased in the Christian world despite historical opposition to the practice.

Acceptance of the practice has grown over the past century, especially in Western Europe, North America and Australia, but not so much in conservative Christian majority places like Eastern and Central Europe, Russia, Sub-Saharan Africa, the Caribbean, the Philippines and in the biggest part of Latin America. In other large areas such as South Asia, it is strongly opposed due to its religious meaning in Christianity, for instance, plus the precedence of Jesus' burial and the rest of the biblical record.

== History ==
In Christian countries, cremation fell out of favor due to the Christian belief in the physical resurrection of the body. Christians also used burial as a mark of difference from the Iron Age European pre-Christian Pagan religions, which usually cremated their dead. Cremation was even outlawed and punishable with death by Charlemagne in AD 789 for this reason. Beginning in the Middle Ages, rationalists and classicists began to advocate for cremation. In Medieval Europe, cremation was practiced only on certain occasions when there were many corpses to be disposed of simultaneously after a battle, during famine or epidemics to stop an imminent threat of disease spread. Much later, Sir Henry Thompson, Surgeon to Queen Victoria, was the first to recommend this practice for health reasons after seeing the cremation apparatus of Professor Ludovico Brunetti of Padua, Italy, at the Vienna Exposition in 1873. In 1874, Thompson founded The Cremation Society of England. The society met opposition from the Church, which would not allow cremation on consecrated ground and from the government as the practice was still illegal.

Cremation was forced into the law of England and Wales when eccentric Welsh doctor William Price attempted to cremate his dead baby son, Iesu Grist, at Llantrisant in January 1884 and was prevented from proceeding by local people. Later tried at Cardiff Assizes and acquitted on the grounds that cremation was not contrary to law, he was able to carry out the ceremony (the first in the UK in modern times) on March 14, 1884 with pagan prayers. On March 26, 1885 the first modern legal cremation in England took place, that of Mrs. Jeanette Pickersgill of London, "well known in literary and scientific circles", by the Cremation Society at Woking, Surrey. This change of attitude prompted the formation of cremation companies in the UK One of the first such was set up in Manchester in 1892, closely followed by Maryhill, Glasgow, in 1895. An Act of Parliament in the UK for the Regulation of burning of human remains, and to enable burial authorities to established crematoria, the "Cremation Act" was eventually passed in 1902, removing all ambiguity. The influence of Hindu/Dharmic belief systems during the British colonial era in India, had a profound influence on how to dispose of the dead in the increasingly crowded UK cities and towns; cremation seen as the most obvious way of avoiding the use of large areas of land for cemeteries.

== Roman Catholic Church ==
For most of its history, the Roman Catholic Church had a ban against cremation. It was seen as a sacrilegious act towards Christians and God, not simply blaspheming but physically declaring a disbelief in the resurrection of the body. The 1917 Code of Canon Law (at canon §1240) prohibited the inhumation within Catholic cemeteries of those who had ordered that their body be cremated. On June 19, 1926, it was promulgated the Latin instruction entitled Cadaverum cremationis against the practice of cremation.

On May 8, 1963, Pope John XXIII lifted the ban on cremation with the instruction Piam et constantem, and in 1966 Pope Paul VI allowed Catholic priests to officiate at cremation ceremonies. The Church still officially prefers the traditional interment of the deceased. Despite this preference, cremation is now permitted as long as it is not done to express a refusal to believe in the resurrection of the body. Until mid-1990's, Church regulations used to stipulate that cremation has to take place after a funeral service. Such funeral services are conducted in the same manner as traditional burials up to the point of committal, where the body is taken to the crematorium instead of being buried. A burial service is performed after the cremation is completed.

In mid 1990's, the funeral rite was modified so that church funerals can take place when the body has already been cremated before the ashes are brought to the church. In such cases, the ashes are placed in an urn or another worthy vessel, brought into the church and placed on a stand near the Easter candle. During the church service and committal rite, prayers that make reference to the body are modified, replacing references to the "Body" of the deceased with "Earthly Remains."

On August 15, 2016, the Congregation for the Doctrine of the Faith released issued an instruction entitled Ad resurgendum cum Christo, which prohibited the dispersion of the ashes "in the air, on the ground or in water or in any other way" nor their conversion into "objects" to be kept for example at home. The instruction required that they be preserved in a sacred place such as a cemetery "or, if appropriate, in a church or in an area specifically dedicated for this purpose by the competent ecclesiastical authority".

Since the lifting of the ban, even with the official preference for burial, the Church has become more and more open to the idea of cremation. Many Catholic cemeteries now provide columbarium niches for housing cremated remains as well as providing special sections for the burial of cremated remains. Columbarium niches have even been made a part of church buildings. The Cathedral of Our Lady of the Angels in Los Angeles, California, has a number of niches in the crypt mausoleum. However, church officials still tend to discourage this practice because of concerns over what would happen to the niches if such a parish closes or decides to replace the current building.

The Church requires reverent disposition of the ashes which means that the ashes are to be buried or entombed in an appropriate container, such as an urn. The Church does not permit the scattering of ashes. Keeping them at home is permitted, but requires a bishop's permission, though some Catholics have done so without seeking it.

Traditional Catholics have objected to the practice of allowing cremation, which sedevacantists believe to be one of the many reasons why the post-Vatican II church is no longer the true Catholic Church.

== Eastern Orthodox Church ==
The Eastern Orthodox Church forbids cremation. While in Orthodoxy there is no direct connection between cremation and the dogma of the general resurrection, it is seen as a violent treatment of the body after death and as such is viewed harshly..

== Protestant Churches ==
The Protestant churches accepted and adopted cremation earlier than the Catholic churches, and cremation is also more common in the Protestant than Catholic countries. Usually cremation is favored in the towns and cities, where land is sparse and cemeteries are crowded, while the traditional burial is favored at the countryside where burial plots are readily available. The highest frequency in the EU is found in the Czech Republic, neighbour to Poland where in contrast cremation after the fall of communism almost has disappeared. The difference between Catholic vs Lutheran version of Christianity is obvious in the relation of cremation. Cremation is somewhat more common in the Protestant parts of Germany, compared with the Catholic parts. In Nazi Germany, Heinrich Himmler invented a "Nazi-funeral ceremony", which ended with cremation. This was used for instance at the State funeral of Field Marshall Erwin Rommel (who had been forced to take his own life, as it was revealed after the war).

Protestant Churches approved cremation gradually after the First World War and the Spanish flu. During the time between the world wars, the development of modern crematoriums also helped to differentiate Christian cremations from Pagan rites of burning the body on a pyre. The first crematorium in Stockholm, Sweden, was built in 1874. In Finland, the Helsinki Lutheran Parish Union built its first modern crematorium in 1926 which is still in use. The first purpose-built crematorium in England was Woking Crematorium, which was built in 1878 and is still in use.

In Scandinavia, approximately 30 to 70 percent (in large cities up to 90 percent) of the dead were cremated around the mid-1980s. However, in later years the high frequency has peaked and fallen; one explanation is the immigration from Muslim, Pentecostal, Catholic and Orthodox nations.

In Scandinavian Lutheran doctrine, the ashes are to be dealt with the same dignity as any earthly remains. They are either to be interred in an urn in a cemetery or sprinkled on consecrated ground, "dust returning to dust," and not stored at home or disposed of in an undignified way. Several littoral parishes do also have consecrated sea areas where the ashes may be sprinkled. Also unmarked "groves of remembrance" (tens of thousands of people buried within an area of 10–50 common graves with a common memorial) have become a common way of burial. Often the undertakers recommend cremation to the mourners. Cremation has also seen the re-appearance of the traditional Scandinavian family graves, where one single grave plot may now contain dozens of urns of the members of the family in several generations. Many Scandinavians prefer their ashes to be interred alongside their family members and loved ones.

The doctrine of the Church of England is similar. According to canon law: "The ashes of a cremated body should be reverently disposed of by a minister in a churchyard or other burial ground in ... or on an area of land designated by the bishop for the purpose ... or at sea. The ordinary position therefore is that ashes are to be buried. They may only be scattered if the bishop has designated land for the purpose of the disposal of cremated remains on that land."

In the Finnish language, Christian cremation is called tuhkaus (incineration), while polttohautaus (burial by burning) refers to Pagan ritual on pyre.

In the American Episcopal Church, cremation has become accepted so much so that many parishes have built columbaria into their churches, chapels and gardens.

While Pentecostal Christians do not forbid cremation, traditional burial is preferred since cremation is perceived as a pagan practice. The Assemblies of God, Church of God by Faith, and Oneness Pentecostals take the view that believers will not lose their salvation if they are cremated.

== The Church of Jesus Christ of Latter-day Saints ==
Leaders of the Church of Jesus Christ of Latter-day Saints (LDS Church) have said that cremation is "not encouraged"; however the church provides instructions for properly dressing the deceased prior to cremation. In the past, Apostle Bruce R. McConkie wrote that "only under the most extraordinary and unusual circumstances" would cremation be consistent with LDS teachings.

The LDS position on cremation was clarified in a 1991 issue of the LDS Church's Ensign Magazine, "Where there is no overriding reason to cremate, burial is still the preferred method of handling our dead. In the end, however, we should remember that the resurrection will take place by the power of God, who created the heavens and the earth. Ultimately, whether a person's body was buried at sea, destroyed in combat or an accident, intentionally cremated or buried in a grave, the person will be resurrected."
