= Gorin (surname) =

Gorin is a surname. In Slavic countries it is used only for males, while the feminine counterpart is Gorina. It may refer to

- Aleksandr Gorin (born 1981), Russian association football player
- B. Gorin (1868–1925), pen name of Isaac Goido, Jewish Russian-American Yiddish writer, journalist, playwright
- Betty Jane Gorin-Smith (born 1940), American historian
- Brandon Gorin (born 1978), American football offensive tackle
- Charlie Gorin (born 1928), Major League Baseball pitcher
- Duino Gorin (born 1951), Italian association football player
- Grigori Gorin (1940–2000), Soviet playwright
- Igor Gorin (1904–1982), Austrian baritone and music teacher
- Jean Gorin (1899–1981), French painter and sculptor
- Jean-Pierre Gorin (born 1943), French filmmaker
- Julia Gorin, American conservative writer, humorist, and political commentator
- Kex Gorin (1949–2007), British drummer
- Michael B. Gorin, American ophthalmologist
- Ted Gorin (1924–2013), Welsh footballer
- Vladimir Gorin (born 1965), Russian Olympic basketball player

== See also ==
- Gorini
