= Cremation Act 1902 =

Act of the Parliament of the United Kingdom

Cremation Act 1902 (Note: Section 1.)
- Act of Parliament
- Parliament of the United Kingdom
- Long title: An Act for the regulation of the burning of Human Remains, and to enable Burial Authorities to establish Crematoria.
- Citation: 2 Edw. 7. c. 8
- Territorial extent: England and Wales; Scotland; (Note: Section 16.)

Dates
- Royal assent: 22 July 1902
- Commencement: 1 April 1903 (Note: Section 15.)
- Repealed: Scotland: 4 April 2019 (Note: The Burial and Cremation (Scotland) Act 2016 (Commencement No. 3, Transitional, Saving and Transitory Provisions) Regulations 2018 (SI 2018/380).)
Other legislation
Amended by	Perjury Act 1911; Scottish Board of Health Act 1919; Statute Law Revision Act 1927; Reorganisation of Offices (Scotland) Act 1928; False Oaths (Scotland) Act 1933; Reorganisation of Offices (Scotland) Act 1939; Criminal Justice Act 1948; Finance Act 1949; Crematorium Act 1952; Criminal Law Act 1967; Local Government Act 1972; Statute Law (Repeals) Act 1978; Local Government (Miscellaneous Provisions) (Scotland) Act 1981; Criminal Justice Act 1982; Church of England (Miscellaneous Provisions) Measure 1992; Statute Law (Repeals) Act 1993; Coroners and Justice Act 2009; Certification of Death (Scotland) Act 2011
Repealed by	Scotland: Burial and Cremation (Scotland) Act 2016

Status: Partially repealed

Text of statute as originally enacted

Revised text of statute as amended

Text of the Cremation Act 1902 as in force today (including any amendments) within the United Kingdom, from legislation.gov.uk.

The Cremation Act 1902 (2 Edw. 7. c. 8) is an act of the Parliament of the United Kingdom. The major purpose of the act was to allow burial authorities to establish crematoria. Later revisions of the Act outlawed open air cremations using funeral pyres, although in 2010 the Court of Appeal ruled this practice to be legal under certain circumstances.

== Background ==
In 1883, eccentric Welshman William Price fathered a child with his housekeeper nearly sixty years his junior, a son named Iesu Grist (Jesus Christ), who was born to him in his eighties. When his son died, aged five months, the heartbroken Price took the boy's body to a hilltop above Llantrisant on a Sunday.

There in full view of the nearby chapel he attempted to cremate the body in paraffin. A furious crowd of locals dragged the body from the flames and nearly killed Price. Later, an autopsy was performed on Iesu's body by a local doctor who concluded that the child had died of natural causes and had not been murdered. Price was therefore not charged with infanticide but was instead tried in a Cardiff courtroom for performing cremation rather than a burial which the police believed to be illegal.

Price argued that while the law did not state that cremation was legal, it also did not state that it was illegal. The judge, Justice Stephen, agreed. Price was freed and returned to Llantrisant to find a crowd of supporters cheering for his victory. On 14 March, he was finally able to give his son a cremation involving his own personal druidic prayers. In 1885, the first official cremation took place at Woking Crematorium, and ten cremations are recorded as being performed in the following year. In 1892 a crematorium opened in Manchester followed by one in Glasgow in 1895 and one in Liverpool in 1896. The case's legal precedent together with the activities of the newly founded Cremation Society of Great Britain led to the Cremation Act 1902.

== Legislation ==
The Act deemed that any power to provide for and maintain burial grounds or cemeteries was to be considered to encompass crematoria. No crematorium built could be closer than fifty yards to any public highway, or in the consecrated area of a burial ground. It could not be built within two hundred yards of any dwelling house without the written consent of the owner, lessee and occupier, and the act was not to be interpreted to "authorise the burial authority or any person to create or permit a nuisance".

The Secretary of State was to create regulations for the maintenance and inspection of crematoria, the circumstances in which they could be used, and the creation of a register of such burnings. All statutory provisions relating to the use of burial registers as evidence were to apply to these registers.

Any breach of these regulations, or burning of human remains outside of the provisions of the Act, would be liable, on summary conviction, to a penalty of up to fifty pounds. Any person found guilty of wilfully making any false representations in order to procure the burning of human remains would be liable to imprisonment with or without hard labour for up to two years; and any person found guilty of attempting to conceal an offence by attempting to procure the burning of human remains would be liable to imprisonment with or without hard labour for up to five years.

The incumbent of a parish was not under any obligation to perform a funeral service for those dying in his parish who were to be cremated; but if he refused to do so, any cleric of the Established Church who was not otherwise disabled from doing so could perform the service at the request of the executor, the persons in charge of the cremation, or the burial authority, with permission from the bishop.

The Act applied to England and Wales, and Scotland, but not to Ireland. It came into effect on 1 April 1903. The Act has since been heavily amended, but remains in force.

=== Open air pyres ===
Open air funeral pyres were made illegal in Britain by the 1930 issue of the Cremation Act. Prior to this but after the 1902 Act, open air cremations had occurred in limited numbers, including several Hindu and Sikh soldiers cremated in Brighton, having died after fighting for the British Empire in World War I (memorialized by the Chattri). The last open air pyre was believed to have occurred in 1934, when the British Government gave special permission to Nepal's ambassador to cremate his wife outdoors in Surrey.

In 2006, Davender Ghai, a British citizen and devout Hindu who had arrived from Kenya in 1958, launched a judicial review of the Act after Newcastle-upon-Tyne City Council refused him a permit to conduct open air cremations in Britain in accordance with Hindu religious practices, which require the burning of the body in a sacramental fire in order to secure the future reincarnation of the soul.

Ghai, through his multi-faith Newcastle based charity the Anglo-Asian Friendship Society, had been campaigning for open air funerals for people of any faith, arguing there was significant demand from the increasingly aging British Hindu and Sikh communities who, due to the Act, often flew bodies of their relatives abroad for cremation. In July 2006, believing the law did not prohibit pyres, Ghai organised the open air cremation of Rajpal Mehat, an Indian-born Sikh illegal immigrant who was found drowned in a London canal. Subsequent delays in identification meant the body was not fit to be repatriated, and Mehat's relatives asked Ghai to organise the ceremony in accordance with their beliefs. The ceremony, held in a field in Northumberland, was Britain's first open air cremation since 1934. Informed prior to the ceremony, local police initially allowed it to take place, but then said it had been illegal. The Crown Prosecution Service agreed, but ruled a prosecution would not be in the public interest. Shortly afterwards, Ghai launched his judicial review to seek clarification of the law and the council's refusal under the Act.

In the review, Ghai argued simultaneously that the act did not outlaw open air pyres if done under the principles of the act, i.e. in a properly authorised and private site and without causing public offence or nuisance, and that if it did, this was an infringement of the Human Rights Act 1998, under articles 8 and 9, specifying citizen's rights to religious freedom and a private and family life, respectively. The British Government, through the Department for Constitutional Affairs (which in 2007 became the Ministry of Justice), backed the council's decision and took an opposition stance during the review, on the basis that open air cremations would offend public decency; that the articles of the human rights were properly limited by the act due to the wider societal implications of pyres; and latterly, due to environmental concerns arising from the practice of burning materials such as mercury fillings.

In seeking permission for his court challenge in 2007, the High Court ruled that "the burning of dead bodies in the open air is not necessarily unlawful" and allowed Ghai to proceed. In February 2010, the Court of Appeal ruled that, as long as open air pyres took place within a structure of some sort, that the practice would be legal under the existing act, although there were outstanding planning and environmental regulatory issues to be settled before pyres would actually be possible.

== See also ==
- Birmingham Crematorium, opened 1903
- Cremation Society of Great Britain, founded 1874
- Woking Crematorium, opened 1878
