= Cremation in Ireland =

History of the topic

Cremation has been carried out as part of funeral rites in the Republic of Ireland since 1982, when the country's first crematorium, Glasnevin Crematorium, was opened. However, cremation in Ireland dates as far back as the Stone Age.

== History ==
The earliest cremations in Ireland were carried out by the Stone Age people between 7000 and 2000 BC. Cremated remains were placed in stone structures such as passage tombs as well as small stone basins, which are thought to have served as resting places for the deceased. In pagan Ireland, ashes and bone fragments were deposited in an ornamented urn, generally made of baked clay, but sometimes of stone instead. Cremation was extensively practised in pagan Ireland. Urns containing ashes and burnt bones have been found in graves in every part of the country. The introduction of Christianity to Ireland in 432 AD caused burial to become the norm as Christian rites sanctioned and continued burial while replacing the old pagan ways. Cremation and burial were practised simultaneously, complete skeletons have been found along with urns containing ashes and burnt bones in the same grave. Cremation was a troublesome and expensive process, and could not have been practised by underprivileged people, who most likely buried the body as it was.

Newgrange in County Meath is the most famous example of a passage tomb in Ireland. It is thought that the remains might have been placed in stone basins in Newgrange as a sort of religious ceremony. Some historians assume that when the sun shines into Newgrange on the Winter Solstice, it represents the souls of the departed being transported into the next life by the sunlight.

When the Cremation Act was passed in the United Kingdom in 1902, it did not extend to Ireland, which was still part of the United Kingdom at the time.

== Facilities ==
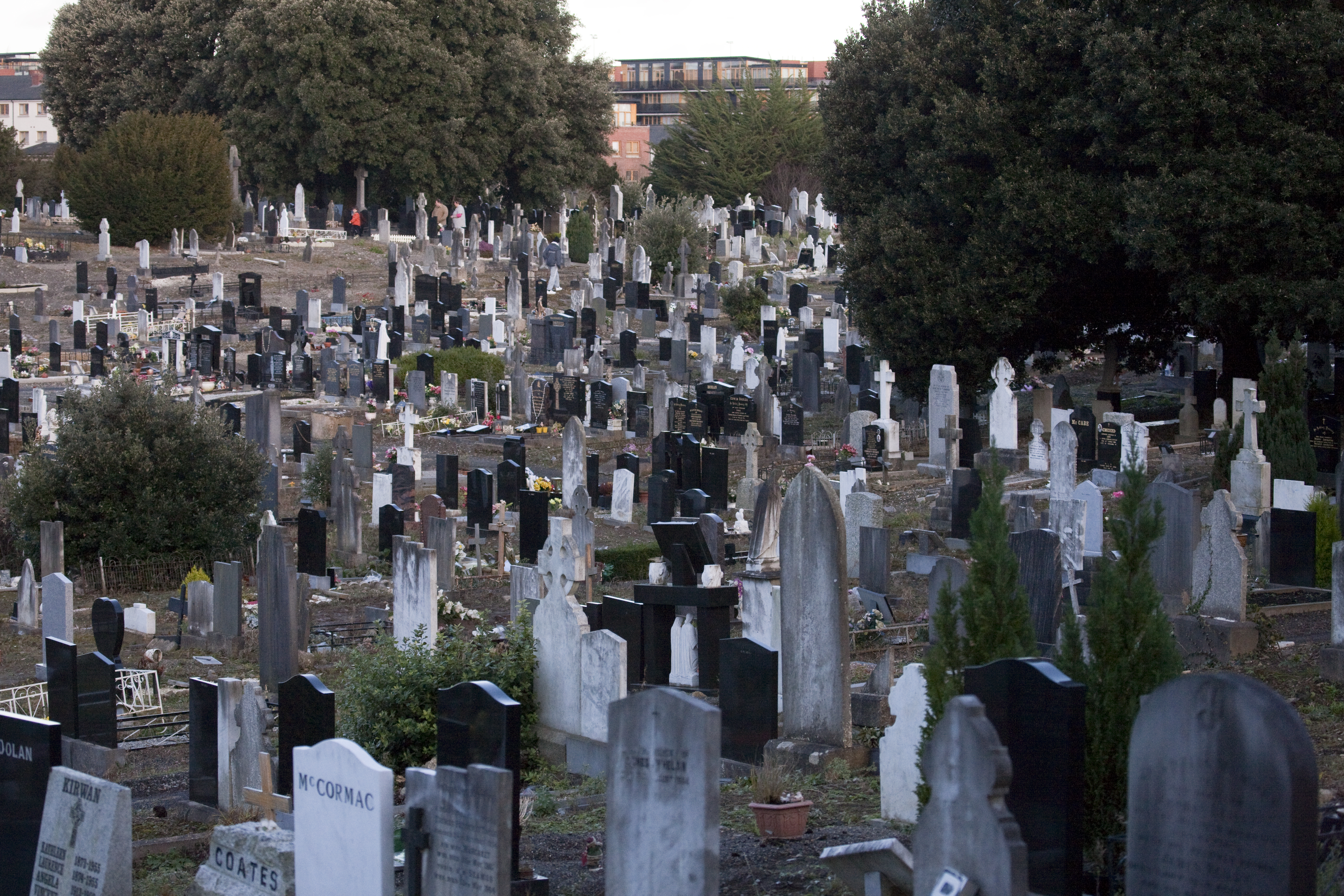
Glasnevin Cemetery

The first crematorium on the island of Ireland opened in Belfast, Northern Ireland, in 1961, but it took another twenty year for modern cremation to be available in the Republic of Ireland, when Glasnevin Cemetery opened their crematorium in March 1982. In 2000, Mount Jerome Cemetery established its own crematorium. The following year, Newlands Cross Cemetery, which opened the previous year, established a crematorium. The Island Crematorium Company in County Cork was established around February 2005. Cremation facilities were opened in County Cavan in mid-2015, in Dublin's Dardistown in October 2016 and in Shannon in 2017.

== Cremation in Ireland today ==
Cremation is increasingly popular in Ireland as an alternative to burial, but it is still not very popular, especially compared to burial. The rate of cremation in Ireland, as of 2017, was 19.61% of all deaths. Famous Irish people who were cremated include Father Ted actor Dermot Morgan and Boyzone singer Stephen Gately, both of whom were cremated at Glasnevin.
