= Gorini =

Gorini is a surname. Notable people with the surname include:

- Edoardo Gorini (born 1974), Italian football manager and player
- Gianluca Gorini (born 1970), Italian cyclist
- Maddalena Gorini (born 1992), Italian basketball player
- Paolo Gorini (1813–1881), Italian scientist
- Walter Gorini (born 1944), Italian track cyclist
