= Pyre =

Form of cremation

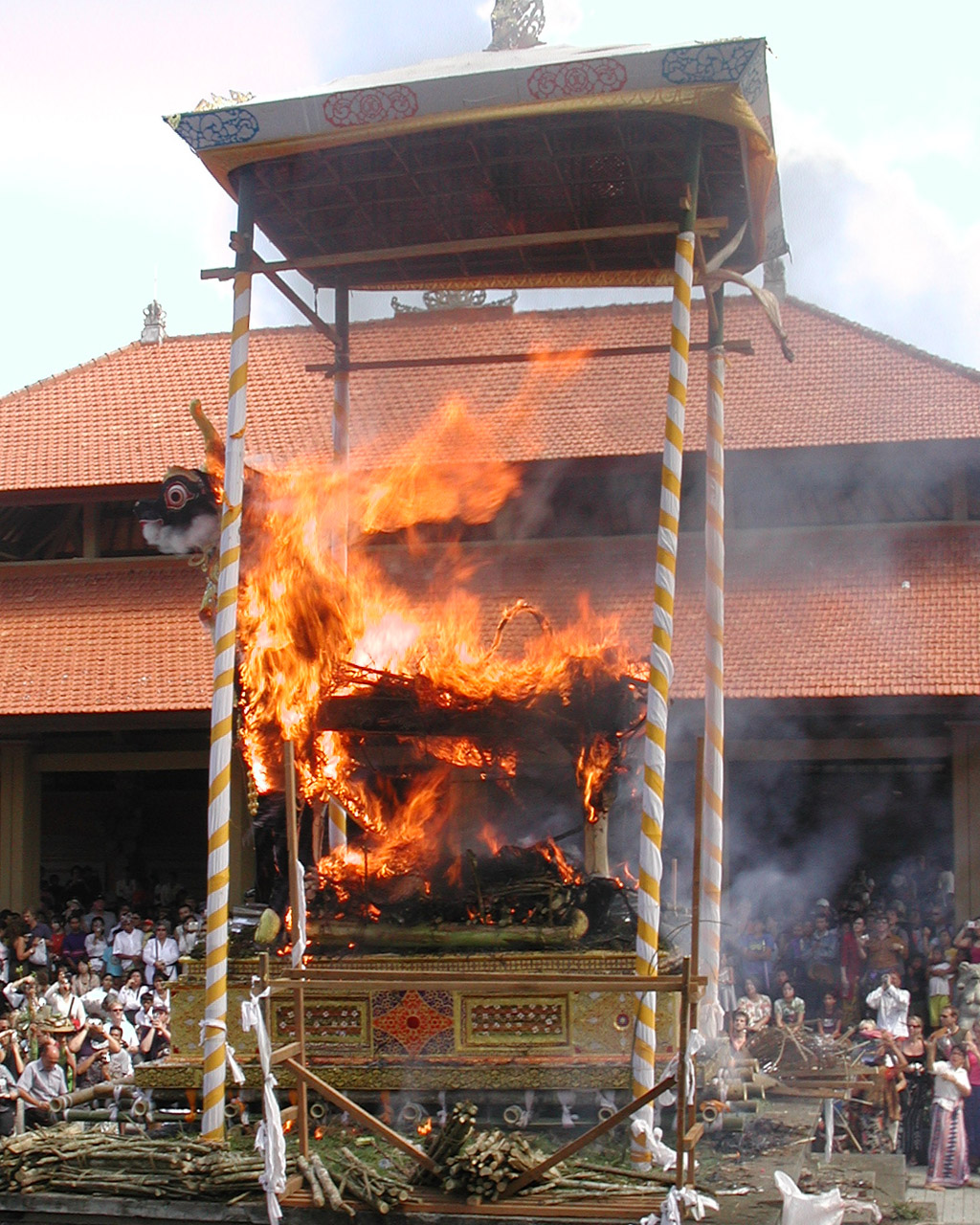
An Ubud cremation ceremony in 2005

A pyre (Ancient Greek: πυρά, romanized: purá; from πῦρ (pûr) 'fire'), also known as a funeral pyre, is a structure, usually made of wood, for burning a body as part of a funeral rite or execution. As a form of cremation, a body is placed upon or under the pyre, which is then set on fire.

In discussing ancient Greek religion, "pyre" (from the Greek word for fire) is also used for the sacred fires at altars, on which parts of the animal sacrifice were burnt as an offering to the deity.

== Materials ==
Pyres are crafted using wood. The composition of a pyre may be determined through use of charcoal analysis. Charcoal analysis helps to predict composition of the fuel and local forestry of the charcoal being studied.

=== Ireland ===
Specifically, in the Bronze Age, pyre materials were gathered based on local abundance and ease of access to the wood although materials were also selected due to the specific properties, potential traditional purpose, or due to economical reasons. In Templenoe, pyres typically consisted of oak and fruit wood compositions.

=== Poland ===
From analyzing three necropolises in Kokotów, Pawłowice, and Korytnica, Polish pyres seemingly consisted of primarily Scots pine, birch, and oak trees, as pines, birch, and oak were dense in local woodlands. All parts of the tree were used including the trunk, branches, twigs, and even pine cones.

During World War II, pyres, which were expedient and not funerary, were used in German death camps to dispose of corpses on Polish territory, such as Treblinka.

=== Pyre remains in Britain ===
Worked antler and bone objects, along with flint and flake tools, and copper-alloys are most commonly found in pyre cremation remains. The copper-alloys leave a blue-green stain and are typically fused to the ribs, arms, and other areas where jewelry is commonly worn.

==== Analysis of bone fragment size ====
A study was done on the bone fragments of cremations to show that not only will movement of the bone fragments cause breakage but also environmental factors play a part. After studying cremation remains in urns that had been tightly sealed and had no evidence of environmental disturbance it was found that on average bigger bone fragment sizes were observed meaning less bone breakage had occurred. It was concluded that if cremated bone is placed in an urn before burial the original bone fragment size will be preserved. This study was intended to explain that more cautionary measures should be taken during and after any cremation occurs and to educate those who are studying cremated bone that the size of the fragments will be smaller than there were right after cremation.

== Uses ==
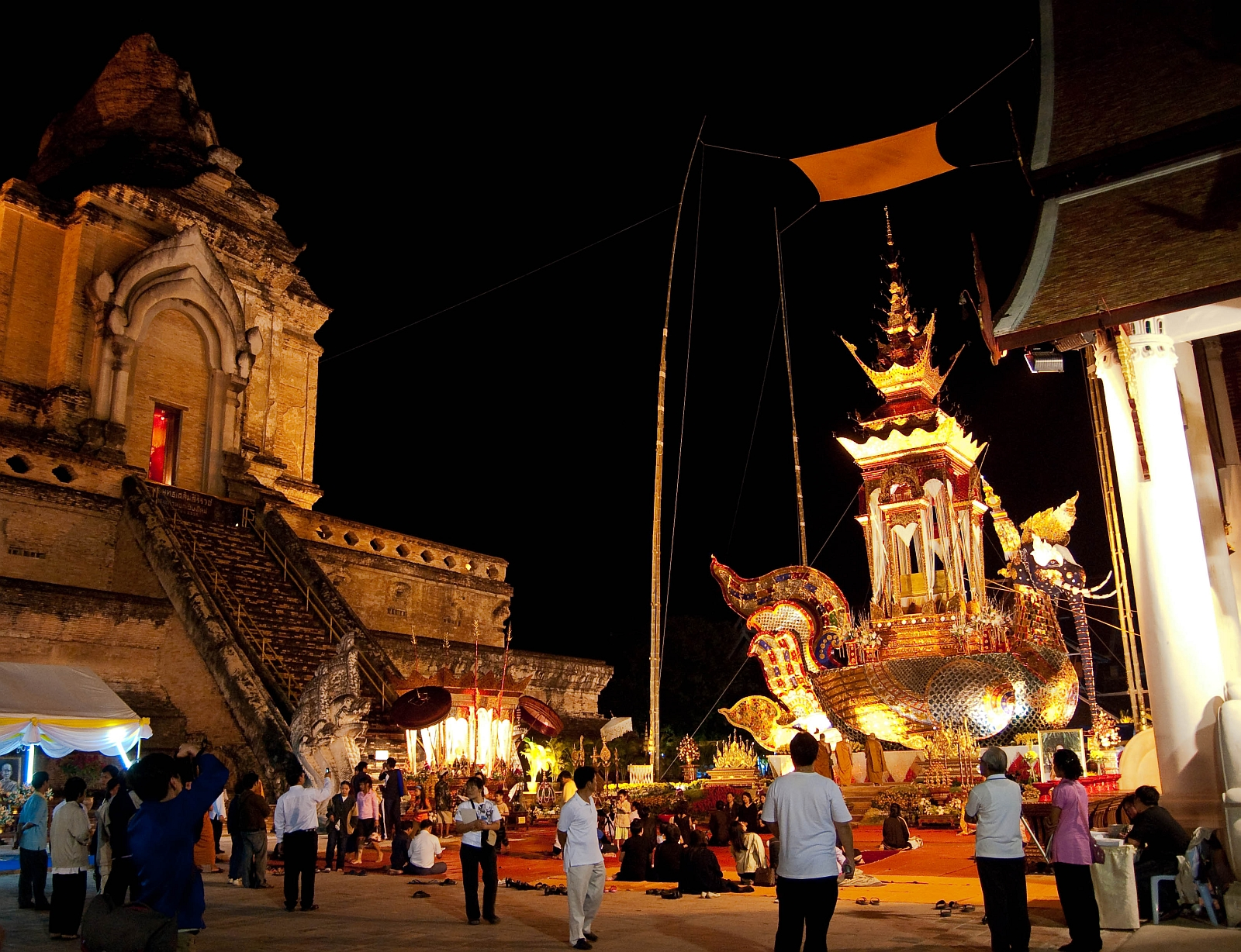
The funeral pyre of Chan Kusalo (the Buddhist high monk of Northern Thailand) at Wat Chedi Luang, Chiang Mai, Thailand

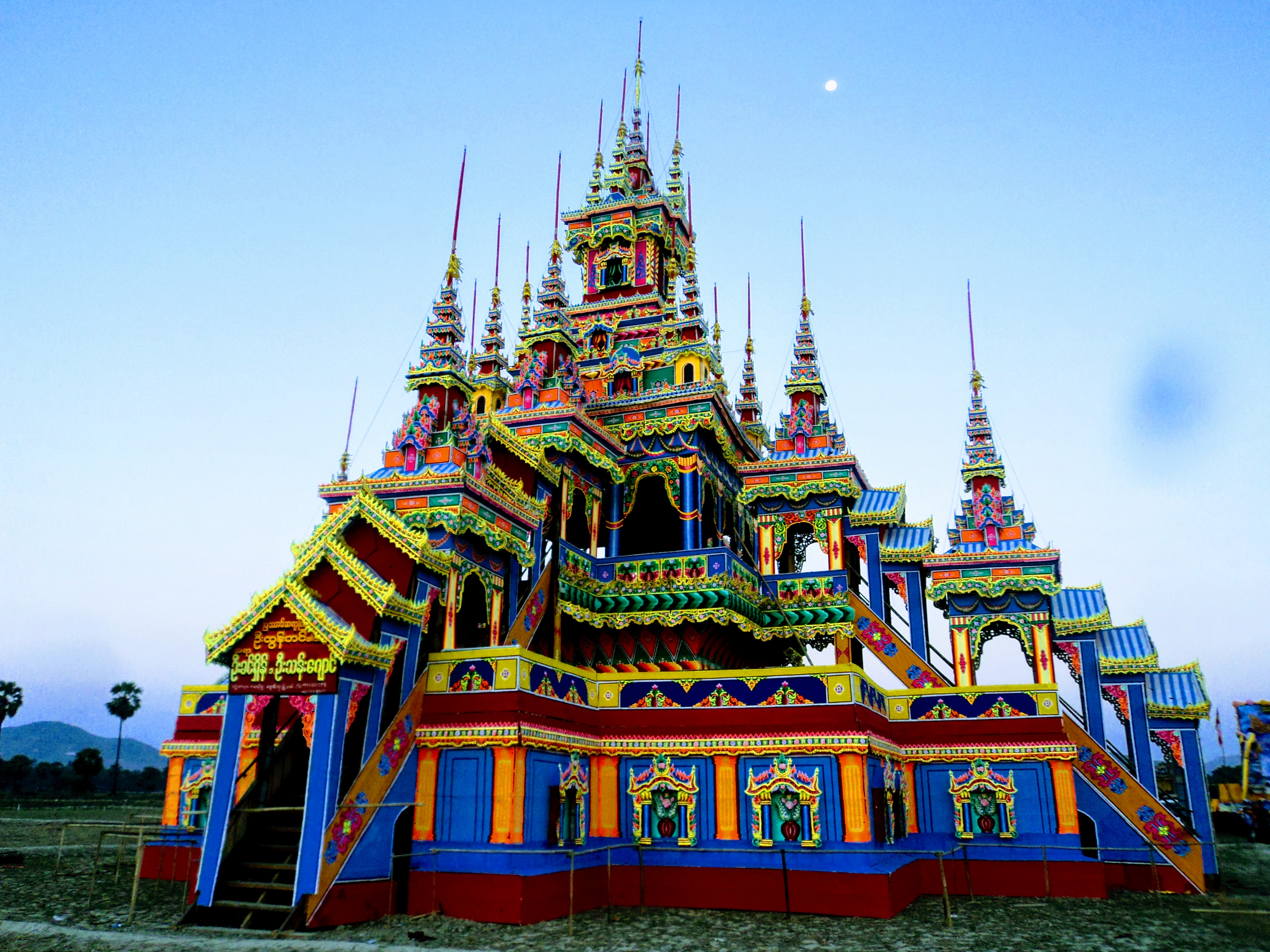
The tiered funeral pyre of Burmese Buddhist Monk at Pa-Auk Village, Mon State.

Traditionally, pyres are used for the cremation of the dead in the Hindu and Sikh religions, a practice which dates back several thousands of years. Funeral pyres were also used in Germanic and Roman culture.

=== Secular ===
Symbolic pyres and bonfires are used in celebrations and remembrance in services. Examples of these are Guy Fawkes Night in the United Kingdom and some Commonwealth countries, where the 'Guy', either seen as an effigy of Guy Fawkes or the Pope, is burned.

Open air pyres were used by the Nazis to cremate the bodies of 1,500,000+ prisoners in Belzec, Sobibor, and Treblinka extermination camps, in contrast to the crematoria used in other camps. Pyres have also been used to dispose of large quantities of livestock in agriculture, particularly those infected with disease.

Pyres are lit around the clock in Varanasi, India as it is considered one of the oldest standing cities. Hindus believe that by resting the ashes of the dead in the Ganges river in at Varanasi, the dead will achieve moksha. Hindus will travel great lengths in order to perform ritualistic duties such as praying, attending to their dead, or to die.

=== Sati practice in Nepal & India ===
Some Hindu groups practiced Sati (also known as suttee). Sati is the act of volunteered self immolation of a widow of the deceased husband with his corpse or remains. This involves volunteering oneself (and generally being in state of samadhi) to be burnt alive on the pyre with the remains of her husband to attain a higher state of life.

== Environmental impacts of pyres ==
=== Environmental impact in Southern Asia ===
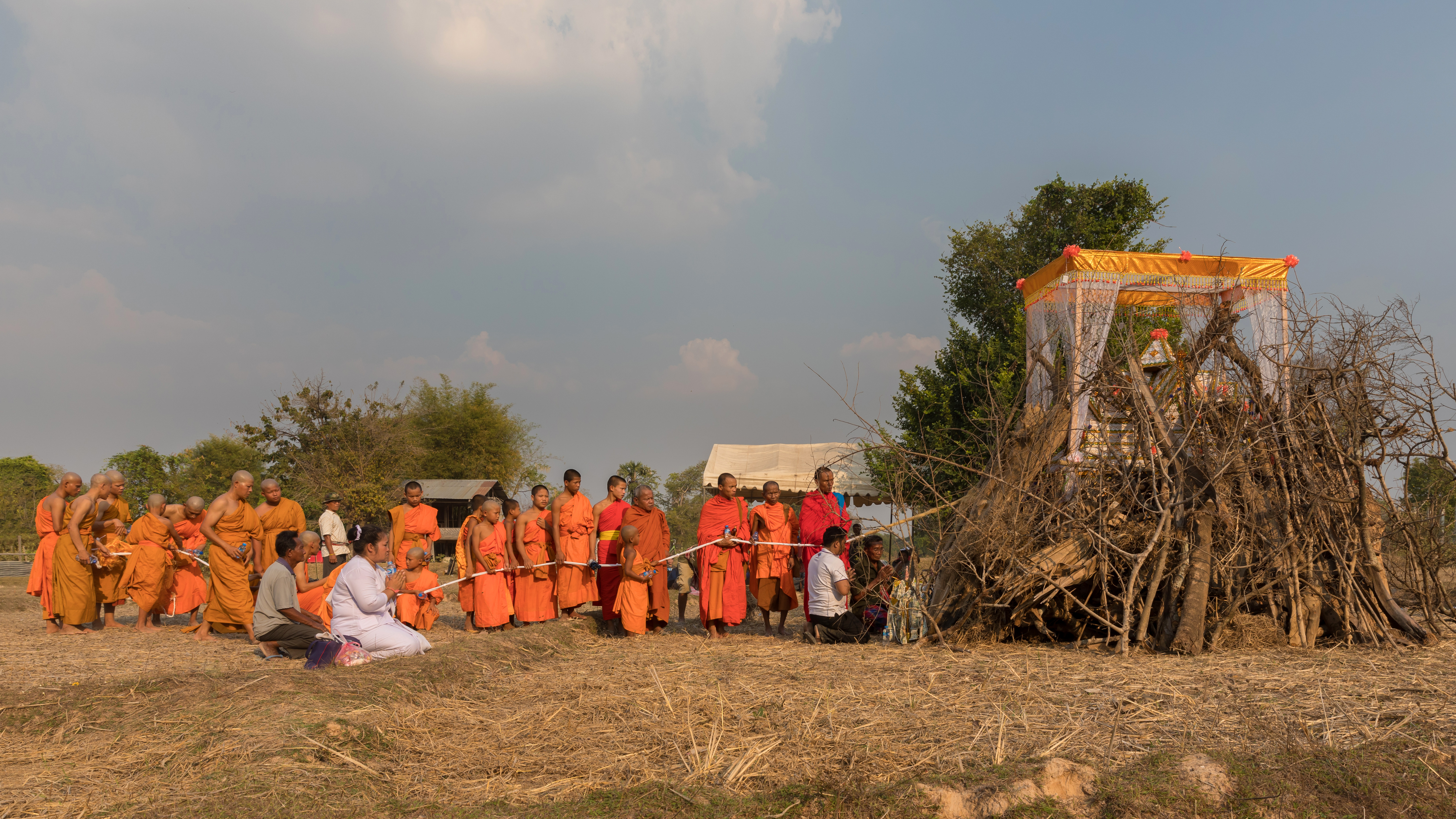
Buddhist monks procession in front of a pyre in Laos

Chakrabarty RK, et al. examined the environmental effects of Southern Asia's funeral pyres in their study, "Funeral pyres in South Asia: Brown carbon aerosol emissions and climate impacts". The heating of the atmosphere from carbonaceous aerosols resulting from human activities is a significant contributor to climate change in South Asia. In this region, fossil fuel use and residential biofuels have been documented to be the primary emitter of light-absorbing black carbon aerosols. The study determined the emitted organic carbon contributed 40% to smoke absorption of visible solar radiation, about 92 Gg, annually.

A second study examined the carbonaceous fractions associated with indoor PM2.5/PM10 during Asian cultural and ritual burning practices. (Dewangan, et al.) This study concluded drastically higher levels of biomass burning markers within burial rituals performed indoors compared to levels collected for residential indoors and ambient outdoors, with levels reaching three- to eightfold higher levels of carbonaceous aerosols. These high chemical levels were also found to correlate to higher aerosol fraction levels during winter months in both Muslim Holy Shrines and marriage places. The study concluded PM concentrations were significantly higher in indoor-ritual locations and suggested further studies and actions be taken to investigate risk and health assessment and calls for regulatory agencies to propose new guidelines for indoor cultural/ritual locations.

=== Environmental impacts in India ===
A traditional Hindu funeral pyre takes six hours and burns 500–600 kg (1,102–1,323 pounds) of wood to burn a body completely. Every year fifty to sixty million trees are burned during cremations in India, which results in about eight million tonnes of carbon dioxide or greenhouse gas emissions. Air pollution, deforestation and large quantities of ash, which are later thrown into rivers, adding to the toxicity of its waters, pose great environmental problems.

The Green Revolution Foundation, under its parent organization Sarthak Charitable Trust, is a Delhi-based NGO working to reduce the environmental impact of funeral pyres. It claims to have created an alternative to wood-based funeral pyres, which reduces the number of trees which need to be cut down. This alternative also promotes the Swachh Bharat Mission. As a result, the cost is reduced significantly and emissions are cut by up to 60%.

== Legality of open-air pyres ==
In ancient times, burning bodies was a commonly practiced form of funerary rituals. Open-air cremations, known as funeral pyres, are uncommon and even illegal in some countries, particularly in the Western World, because it is considered taboo. While cremation is commonplace, open air cremations in the United Kingdom were considered to be unlawful under the Cremation Act 1902. The law was created to prevent the creation of a private cremation industry and because of issues concerning property. But at the time environmental concerns did not play any factor in the creation of the law.

In February 2010, a Hindu man named Davender Ghai was granted permission to be cremated on a traditional open-air pyre, when a court of appeals in the United Kingdom ruled them legal inside of a building with an open roof and away from roads or homes. In the U.S. in Crestone, Colorado, a group that is part of the Crestone End of Life Project, obtained legal permission to perform "open-air cremations". Others have attempted to open up more outdoor funeral pyres but have faced disapproval. As of 2021, Crestone was the only place where open-air cremations are legal in the United States. They can perform around 12 a year, regardless of religion and families can be involved in the process if they would like. At this time, the group only allows people who are part of the local community to choose this alternative burial.

== Roman pyres ==
In the time leading up to the 2nd century CE popular funeral practices in Rome consisted of cremation with a pyre. Ideal funeral practices meant burning an ornamental pyre for the deceased, that would burn with enough heat and a long enough time to only leave ashes and small bone fragments. Having to use another's pyre was a sign of poverty or emergency cases.

The process of constructing and properly burning a funeral pyre is a skilled task. Often, pyres would not burn with enough heat to properly cremate human remains. Pyres had to be maintained by stoking the flame and raking the pyre to allow good oxygen flow. Ancient literature refers to the skilled job of an ustor, meaning a professional pyre builder derived from the Latin word ūrere "to burn". However, regardless of professional build, pyres were unpredictable and would go wrong on a regular basis. The Elder Pliny writes of extreme cases in which bodies have been thrown from the pyre from the force of the flames. Other cases, described by Plutarch, involving deceased victims of poisoning, resulted in the human body bursting open and dousing the pyre.

== Forensic evaluation of pyres ==
A study conducted by Alunni, et al. examined the forensic science behind cremations on wooden pyres. The study concluded the average pyre does not completely destroy a human body effectively, and differences in suicide via pyres are evident in the remains. A pyre suicide shows signs of remains being more charred rather than completely oxidized by high temperatures, are in anatomically correct positions, poor bone fragmentation, and is without suspicious burn patterns compared to an individual murdered via pyre. Cremated remains are different from traditional human remains in the sense that their physical appearance including bone vary in color, fragmentation, and differ from their original shape and dimension. This is why forensic experimental studies are necessary to fully understand the differences the body undergoes in a pyre. Coloring of bones before cremation is dependent on oxygen exposure, duration, and temperature. The bone color can range from black to brown or an oxidized white color. The type of bone and method of cooling may also alter the bone form. Cooling is also an important consideration, for if the remains are cooled via water it increases warping. This knowledge is a consideration for archaeologists to understand the remains from pyres.
