= Giuseppe Rovani =

Italian writer (1818–1874)

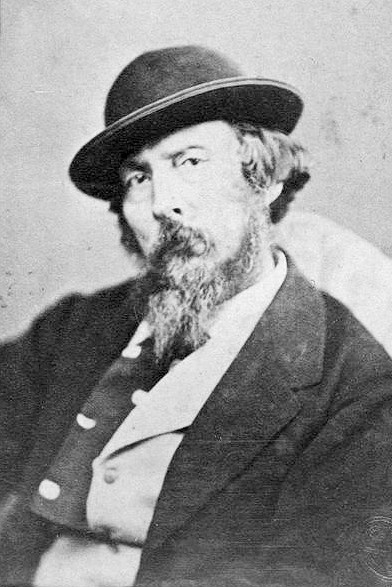
- Giuseppe Rovani
- Born: 12 January 1818; Milan, Kingdom of Lombardy–Venetia
- Died: 26 January 1874 (aged 55); Milan, Kingdom of Italy
- Occupations: novelist, essayist
- Writing career
- Notable work: Cento Anni
- Literary movement: Scapigliatura

Giuseppe Rovani (12 January 1818 – 26 January 1874) was an Italian novelist and essayist. He took part in the Italian Risorgimento and was a forerunner of the Milanese Scapigliatura.

== Biography ==
Rovani was born in Milan. A staunch republican, he was exiled in Switzerland with Giuseppe Mazzini and Carlo Cattaneo after the revolution of 1848. He was eventually driven by debts to agree to write the official account of the visit of the Emperor Franz Joseph I of Austria in 1857. By that stage he was closely associated with the Scapigliati, Carlo Dossi in particular, and a prey to the alcoholism that would eventually kill him.

Rovani was known for criticism of historical novels of the Romantic style, which were popular in Italy at the time and whose stereotypes and old fashioned plots he pointed out. His historical novels, which begin with Lamberto Malatesta (1843), replace Romantic idealism with scepticism, and focus on the glamour and squalor of bohemian existence rather in the manner of operatic realism. His major work, Cento anni, which appeared first in serial form in 1857–8, attempts to reproduce the successes of Balzac and Dumas. Basically the memoirs of a thief turned banker, it tells in a somewhat episodic manner the history of a family over five generations. Together with Ippolito Nievo's Confessioni di un italiano, Rovani's Cento Anni had an important impact on the evolution of Italian novel. In 1859 he was part of a consortium of writers who co-edited the newspaper Gazzetta di Milano.

Rovani had always been interested in the relations between the arts, and in the essays gathered in Le tre arti (1874) he theorized his ideas on synaesthesia. These are already discernible in Cento anni and become more evident in his late novels, from La Libia d'oro (1868) onwards.

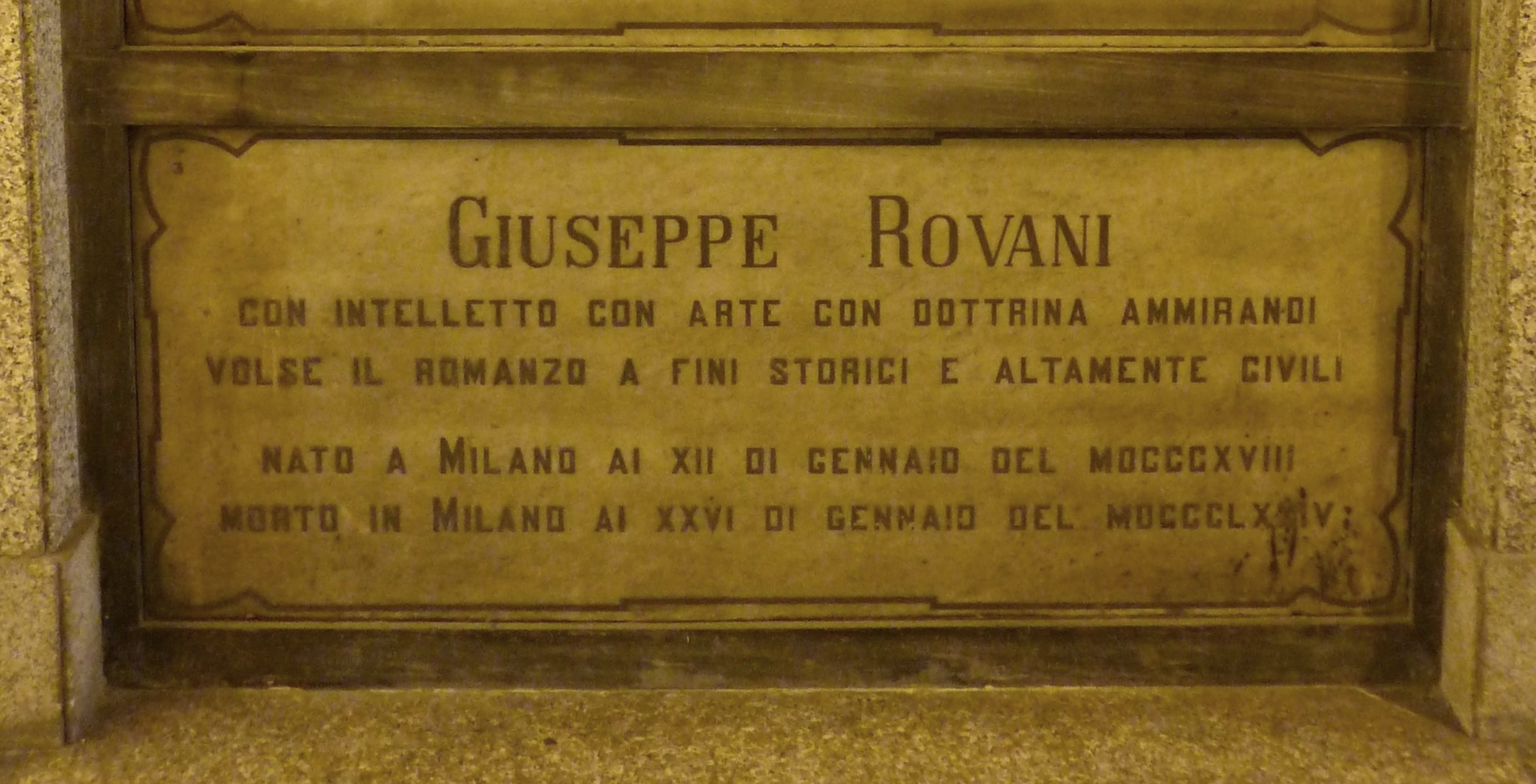
Rovani's grave at the Monumental Cemetery of Milan, Italy

Rovani died in Milan in 1874. His body was embalmed by Paolo Gorini and was buried in the Cimitero Monumentale di Milano.

== Works ==
- Bianca Cappello. Dramma storico in cinque giornate. Milan: presso G. Crespi. 1839.
- Lamberto Malatesta o I masnadieri degli Abruzzi. Milan: presso la Libreria Ferrario. 1843.
- Valenzia Candiano. Milan: tipografia di Vincenzo Guglielmini e la Libreria Ferrario. 1844.
- Manfredo Palavicino o I francesi e gli Sforzeschi. Storia italiana. Milan: per Borroni e Scotti. 1845–1846.
- Simone Rigoni. Dramma storico in cinque atti. Milan: Borroni e Scotti. 1847.
- Di Daniel Manin, presidente e dittatore della Repubblica di Venezia. Memoria storica. Capolago: tip. elvetica. 1850.
- Storia della Grecia negli ultimi trent'anni: 1824-1854. Milan: Ferrario. 1854.
- Storia delle lettere e delle arti in Italia [...] dal secolo XIIII fino ai nostri giorni. Milan: C. Nicolini. 1855–1858.
- Cento anni. 5 vols. Milan: tipografia Wilmant, 1859-1864.
- La mente di Gioachino Rossini. Milan: Ricordi. 1868.
- La Libia d'oro. Milan: stab. Redaelli della Società Chiusi e Rechiedei. 1868.
- La giovinezza di Giulio Cesare. Scene romane. Milan: Legros. 1873.
- La mente di Alessandro Manzoni. Milan: L. Perelli. 1873.
- Le tre arti considerate in alcuni illustri italiani contemporanei. 2 vols. Milan: F.lli Treves, 1874.
