= Cremation Society of Great Britain =

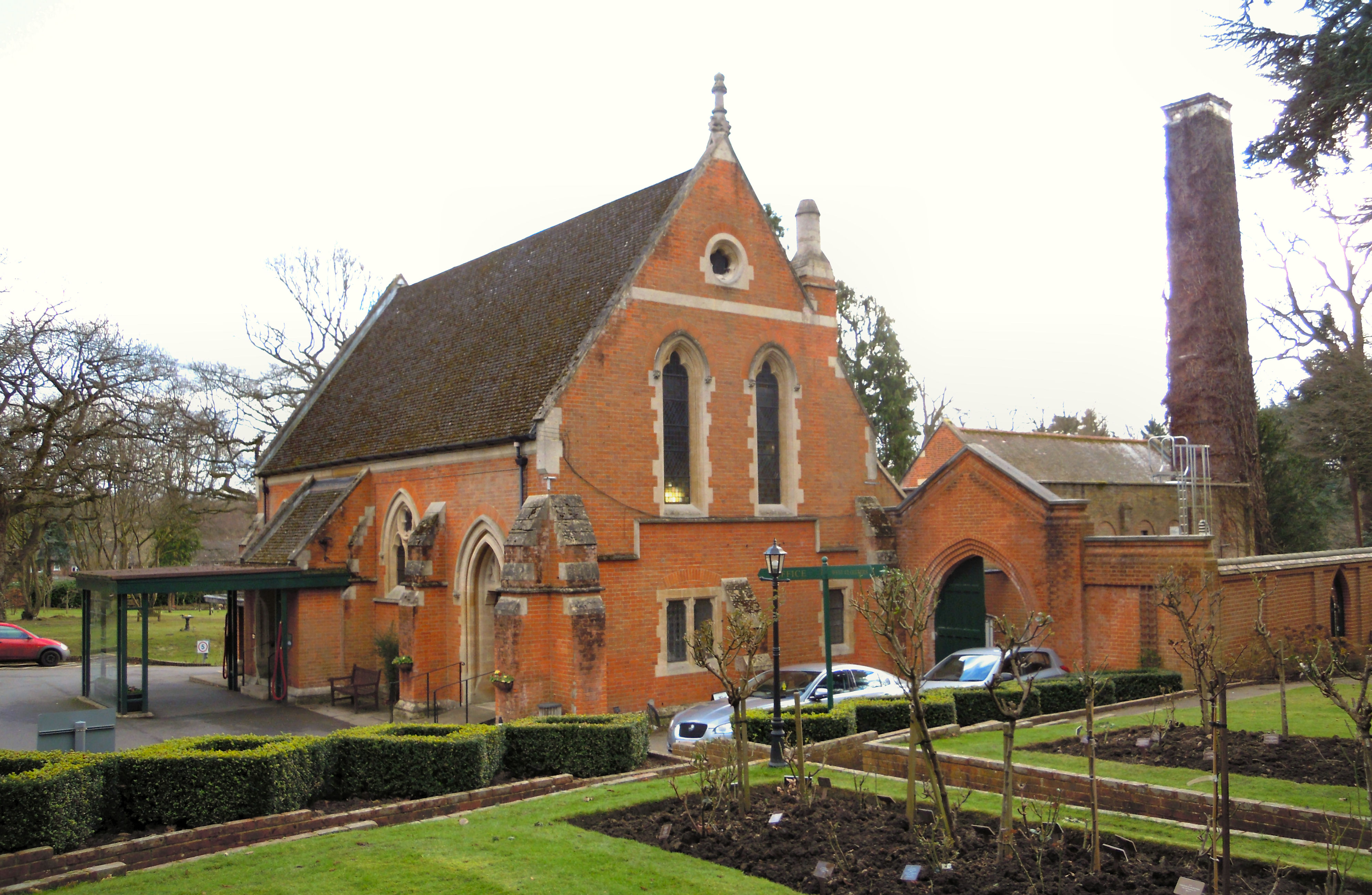
The Cremation Society of England built Woking Crematorium in 1878

The Cremation Society of Great Britain (founded as the Cremation Society of England and now known simply as the Cremation Society) was founded in 1874 to promote the use of cremation as an alternative means of dealing with the bodies of the dead instead of burial which until then was the only option. Today the society is a registered charity and is not conducted for profit.

== Early history ==
In Europe, a movement to reintroduce cremation as a viable method for body disposal began in the early 1870s. This was made possible by the invention of new furnace technology and contact with Eastern cultures that practiced it. At the time, many proponents believed in the miasma theory, and that cremation would reduce the "bad air" that caused diseases. In 1869, the idea was presented to the Medical International Congress of Florence by Professors Coletti and Castiglioni "in the name of public health and civilization". In 1873 Professor Paolo Gorini of Lodi and Professor Ludovico Brunetti of Padua published reports of practical work they had conducted. A model of Brunetti's cremating apparatus, together with the resulting ashes, was exhibited at the Vienna Exposition in 1873 and attracted great attention

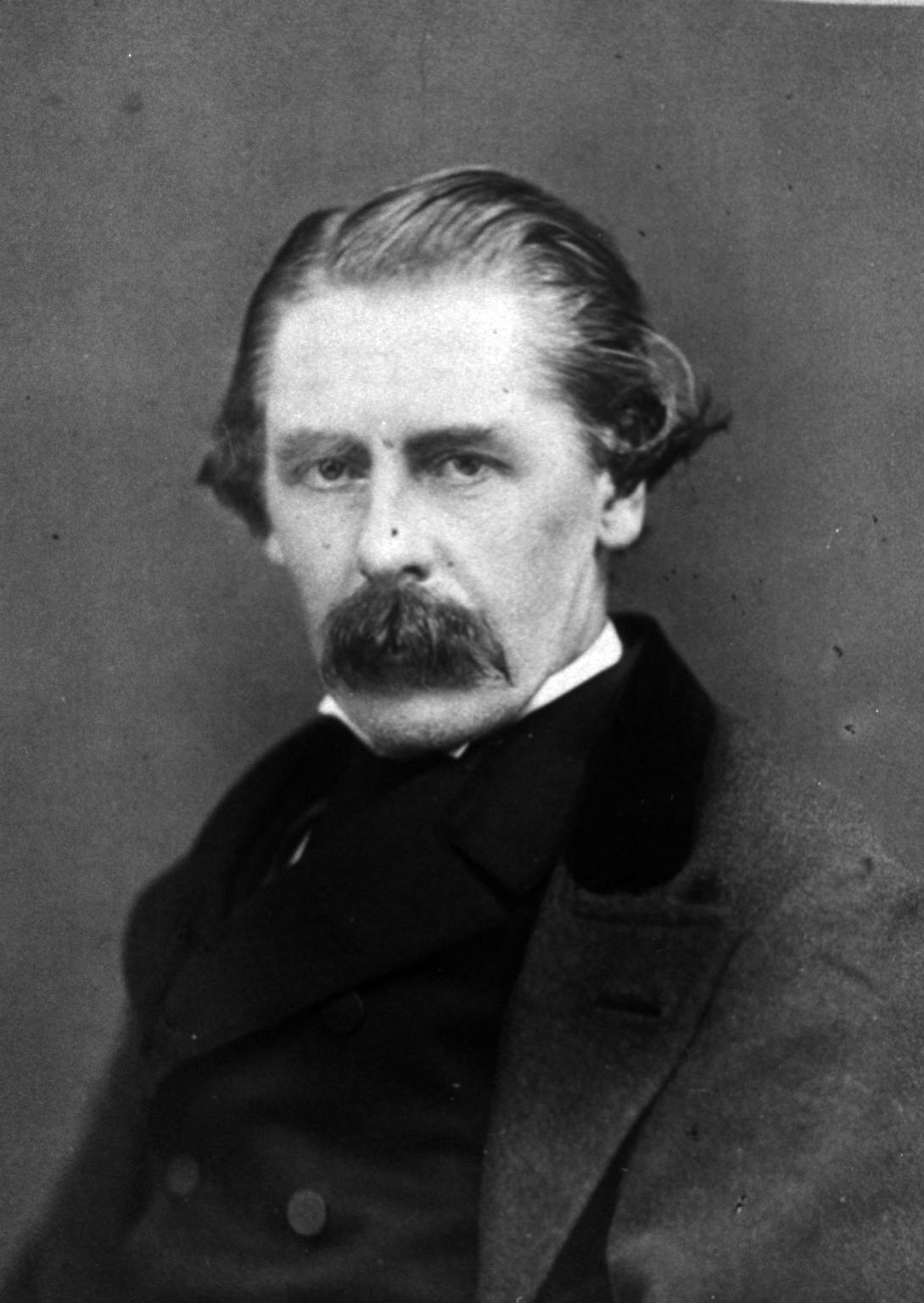
Sir Henry Thompson, founder and first President

The Cremation Society of England was founded in 1874 by Sir Henry Thompson, a surgeon and Physician to the Queen in which capacity he served Queen Victoria; he was also to become its first president. He had seen Gorini's cremator at the Vienna Exhibition and had returned home to become the first and chief promoter of cremation in England. Thompson's article 'The Treatment of the Body after Death' appeared in The Contemporary Review in January 1874. In it he wrote: "it was becoming a necessary sanitary precaution against the propagation of disease among a population daily growing larger in relation to the area it occupied". While his main argument in support of cremation concerned hygiene his other reasoning included that cremation would lessen the chances of burial alive, reduce the cost of funerals, save mourners from having to stand in all weathers during interment, and cremation urns would be safe from vandalism. Thompson further expressed the radical financial argument that the resultant ashes could be utilised as fertilizer. The ensuing debate in the press encouraged Thompson to call a meeting of his friends at his home at 35 Wimpole Street on 13 January 1874 during which a declaration was written and signed by those present. This stated:

"We, the undersigned, disapprove the present custom of burying the dead, and we desire to substitute some mode which shall rapidly resolve the body into its component elements, by a process which cannot offend the living, and shall render the remains perfectly innocuous. Until some better method is devised we desire to adopt that usually known as cremation."

Apart from Thompson the co-signatories of the declaration included: Shirley Brooks, Frederick Lehmann, John Everett Millais, John Tenniel, Anthony Trollope and Sir Thomas Spencer Wells. At this meeting the Cremation Society of England was created. Its founder Sir Henry Thompson wrote that the society was "organised expressly for the purpose of obtaining and disseminating information on the subject and for adopting the best method of performing the process, as soon as this could be determined, provided that the act was not contrary to Law". They founded the United Kingdom's first crematorium, Woking Crematorium in Woking in Surrey with Gorini travelling to England to assist the installation of a cremator. It was first tested on 17 March 1879 with the body of a horse. However, after protests and an intervention by the Home Secretary, Sir Richard Cross, their plans were put on hold. In 1884, the Welsh Neo-Druidic priest William Price was arrested and put on trial for attempting to cremate his son's body. Price successfully argued in court that while nothing in statute or common law stated that cremation was lawful, likewise there was nothing to establish that it was unlawful. The case set a precedent that allowed the Cremation Society to proceed with its plans.

== First British cremations ==
In 1885, the first unchallenged cremation in the United Kingdom took place in Woking. The remains were those of Jeanette Pickersgill, a well-known figure in literary and scientific circles. By the end of the year, the Cremation Society of England had overseen two more cremations, making a total of three out of 597,357 deaths in Great Britain and Ireland that year. In 1888, 28 cremations took place at the same venue. In 1891, Woking Crematorium added a chapel, pioneering the concept of a crematorium being a place for funeral services, as well as for the disposal of human remains.

The Cremation Society of England drew up the original forms of certification for cremation, which in due course were adopted as the basis for the Cremation Act 1902.

== The movement spreads ==
After opening Woking Crematorium, the society supported the opening of crematoria in other cities, with the Manchester Crematorium opening in 1892, Glasgow Crematorium in 1895, Liverpool Crematorium in 1896, and Darlington Crematorium in 1901. Meanwhile, Thompson's idea spread as far as the United States and Japan. The Hull Crematorium was opened in 1901 by the local corporation. In 1902, Golders Green Crematorium was built by the London Crematorium Company Ltd, which had been founded by Thompson. Birmingham Crematorium opened in 1903.

During the First World War, the society was not able to spread its message, but its cause was publicised by the cremation of the Duchess of Connaught in 1917. Gradually, more and more people turned to cremation, including prime ministers and bishops of the Church of England. In 1930 the society changed its name from The Cremation Society of England to The Cremation Society of Great Britain.

Since its foundation in 1874 the Cremation Society has worked to popularise the use of cremation among all branches and levels of society. Over the decades the society has assisted and advised private companies and local authorities on the building of new crematoria at the same time as lobbying government to ease the restrictions which were preventing cremation from being readily available to all.

Today cremation accounts for about 78% of all funerals in the United Kingdom. In 2008 the society amended its Memorandum and Articles of Association so that it could investigate alternative methods of dealing with the bodies of the dead.

The Archive of The Cremation Society is held in the Durham University Library at Durham University.

== Past Presidents of the Cremation Society ==
- 1874 - 1904: Sir Henry Thompson, Bt., FRCA.
- 1904 - 1921: Sir Charles Cameron, Bt., MD, LLB, MP
- 1921 - 1940: His Grace The Duke of Bedford, KG.
- 1940 - 1955: The Rt. Hon. Lord Horder, GCVO, FRCP.
- 1955 - 1960: The Rt. Hon. The Earl of Verulam, MA, JP.
- 1960 - 1970: Sir John Cameron, Bt., MA, LLB.
- 1970 - 1982: The Rt. Hon. The Lord Greenwood of Rossendale PC, JP.
- 1982 - 1990: The Rt. Hon. The Lord Marshall of Leeds, KBE, MA, LLM.
- 1992 - 2013: Rt. Hon. The Earl Grey
- 2013 - 2020: Vacant on the death of Earl Grey
