= Gorin (air base) =

Airport in Khabarovsk Krai, Russia

Gorin
- Gorin, Solnechny District, Khabarovsk Krai in Russia

Site information
- Type: Air Base
- Owner: Ministry of Defence

Location
- Shown within Khabarovsk Krai Gorin (Russia)
- Coordinates: 51°10′18″N 136°38′6″E

Site history
- In use: 1992

Airfield information
- Identifiers: ICAO: ZC34
- Elevation: 150 metres (492 ft) AMSL
Runways
Direction	Length and surface
02/20	3,000 metres (9,843 ft) Concrete

Gorin is a former air base in Khabarovsk Krai, Russia located 4 km SW Gorin, Amur, and 75 km northwest of Komsomolsk-na-Amure. It contained a 1 km long remote ramp on the north side. A noteworthy major, but remote airfield. It may have been intended for dispersion of intermediate-range bombers during a Sino-Soviet conflict.
