= Julia Gorin =

American journalist

- Born: 1972 (age 53–54); Soviet Union
- Occupation: Writer
- Writing career
- Language: English, Russian

Julia Gorin (born 1972) is an American conservative writer, journalist, humorist, and political commentator.

== Life ==
Born into a Jewish family in the Soviet Union, Gorin immigrated as a toddler to the United States in 1976. Her father was a violinist with the Baltimore Symphony Orchestra. She is a 1990 graduate of the Randallstown High School in Randallstown, Maryland.

Gorin wrote the satirical 2008 book, Clintonisms: The Amusing, Confusing, and Even Suspect Musing, of Billary (ISBN 0978721330).

== Writings and affiliations ==
Gorin has contributed articles to Jewish World Review, National Review, The Wall Street Journal, FrontPage Magazine, Jihad Watch, The Huffington Post, The American Thinker, The Christian Science Monitor, WorldNetDaily and FoxNews.com.

Gorin is an unpaid member of the Advisory Board of the American Council for Kosovo, which lobbies on behalf of the Serbian National Council of Kosovo and Metohija. She frequently writes about the former Yugoslavia, especially Kosovo and is an opponent of its independence.

After the January 6, 2021, attacks on the US Capitol, Gorin wrote an OpEd in the Washington Times comparing the Congressional response to that of post-invasion Kosovo.
