= Jeanette Pickersgill =

English painter cremated in 1885

Jeanette Pickersgill (30 November 1813 – 20 March 1885) was an English painter. She was the first person to be legally cremated in the United Kingdom, at Woking Crematorium in Surrey.

== Life ==
She was born Jeannette Caroline Grover in 1813 in Amsterdam. She married the artist Henry Hall Pickersgill on 20 July 1837 at St Anne's, Soho. He died 7 January 1861.

She published a volume of poetry in 1827 entitled Tales of the Harem. She exhibited at the Royal Academy between 1848 and 1863. The 1881 Census lists her as an annuitant living at 59 Dorset Square in Regent's Park in London. On her death The Times described Pickersgill as "a well-known figure in literary and scientific circles".

== Cremation and aftermath ==
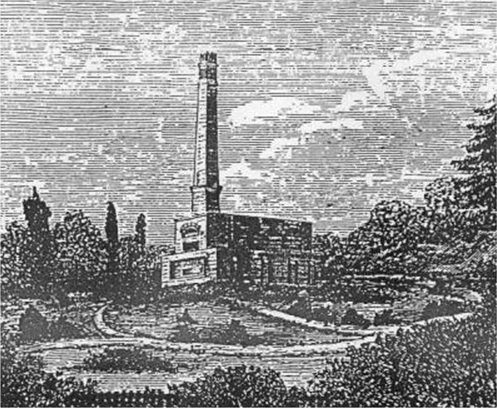
The cremator at Woking Crematorium in the 1870s, before the chapel and buildings were constructed

Pickersgill was cremated six days after her death. The great concern at the time was that the person may not be actually dead, and the thought of being burned alive was too shocking for the Victorians to contemplate. Due to this concern, two doctors certified that Pickersgill was dead.

The cremation took one hour and 15 minutes. Mrs Pickersgill's ashes were transported to Kensal Green Cemetery and placed in a wooden box on a shelf in the catacomb under the Anglican Chapel along with those of William Crellin Pickersgill (who was cremated at Woking in 1887). The ashes continue to remain in position, although the wooden box has deteriorated.

By year's end, only three cremations had taken place out of 597,357 deaths in the UK. At that time cremation was championed by the Cremation Society of Great Britain. By 1901, with six crematoria established, only 427 cremations took place out of 551,585 deaths - less than one-tenth of one percent. However, by the end of the century (2000), over 240 crematoria were in use. Over 70% of the deceased were cremated (437,609 out of 611,960 deaths).

== See also ==
- Dr. William Price, eccentric Welsh physician and advocate of cremation
