= William Price (physician) =

Welsh physician and political activist (1800–1893)

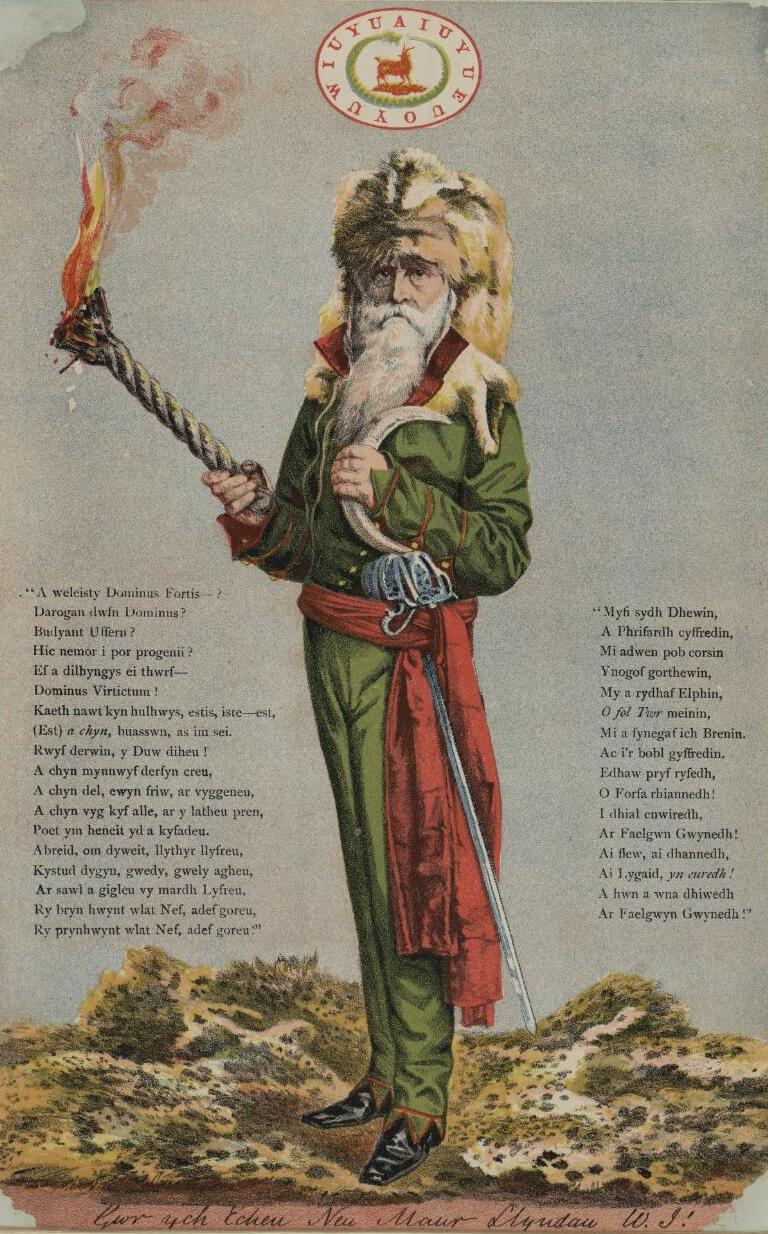
- 19th-century lithograph of Price
- Born: 4 March 1800; Rudry, Caerphilly, Wales
- Died: 23 January 1893 (aged 92); Llantrisant, Glamorgan, Wales
- Occupations: Physician, political activist
- Known for: His involvement in Chartism and Neo-Druidry, and for pioneering of cremation in Great Britain

William Price (4 March 1800 – 23 January 1893) was a Welsh physician and political activist best known for his support of Welsh nationalism, Chartism and involvement with the Neo-Druidic religious movement. Historians have characterised Price as one of the most significant figures in Wales during the Victorian era.

Born into a working class family in Rudry, Caerphilly, Price underwent medical training in London before returning to Wales, becoming interested in the Chartists' ideas regarding democracy and civil and political rights for all men. Following the failed Chartist Newport Rising in 1839, he escaped prosecution by fleeing to France, where he became convinced that an ancient prophecy predicted that he would achieve Welsh independence from the United Kingdom.

Returning to Wales, Price tried reviving what he believed to be the religion of the ancient druids, Celtic ritualists active during the Iron Age. In doing so, he became one of the most prominent proponents of the Neo-Druidic movement, something that had been developing since Iolo Morganwg's activities in the late 18th century. After cremating his dead son in 1884, Price was arrested and put on trial by those who believed cremation was illegal under English law. He successfully argued that there was no legislation that specifically outlawed it, which paved the way for the Cremation Act 1902. Upon his death, he was cremated in a ceremony watched by 20,000 onlookers.

Known for adhering to beliefs such as supporting equal rights for all men, vegetarianism, vaccine hesitancy and cremation, and opposition to vivisection and marriage, some of which were highly controversial at the time, he has been widely known as an "eccentric" and a "radical". Since his death he has been remembered by some people as "one of the great Welshmen of all time". A permanent exhibition and statue dedicated to him has been inaugurated in the town of Llantrisant, where he had lived for much of his later life.

== Biography ==
=== Early life: 1800–1821 ===
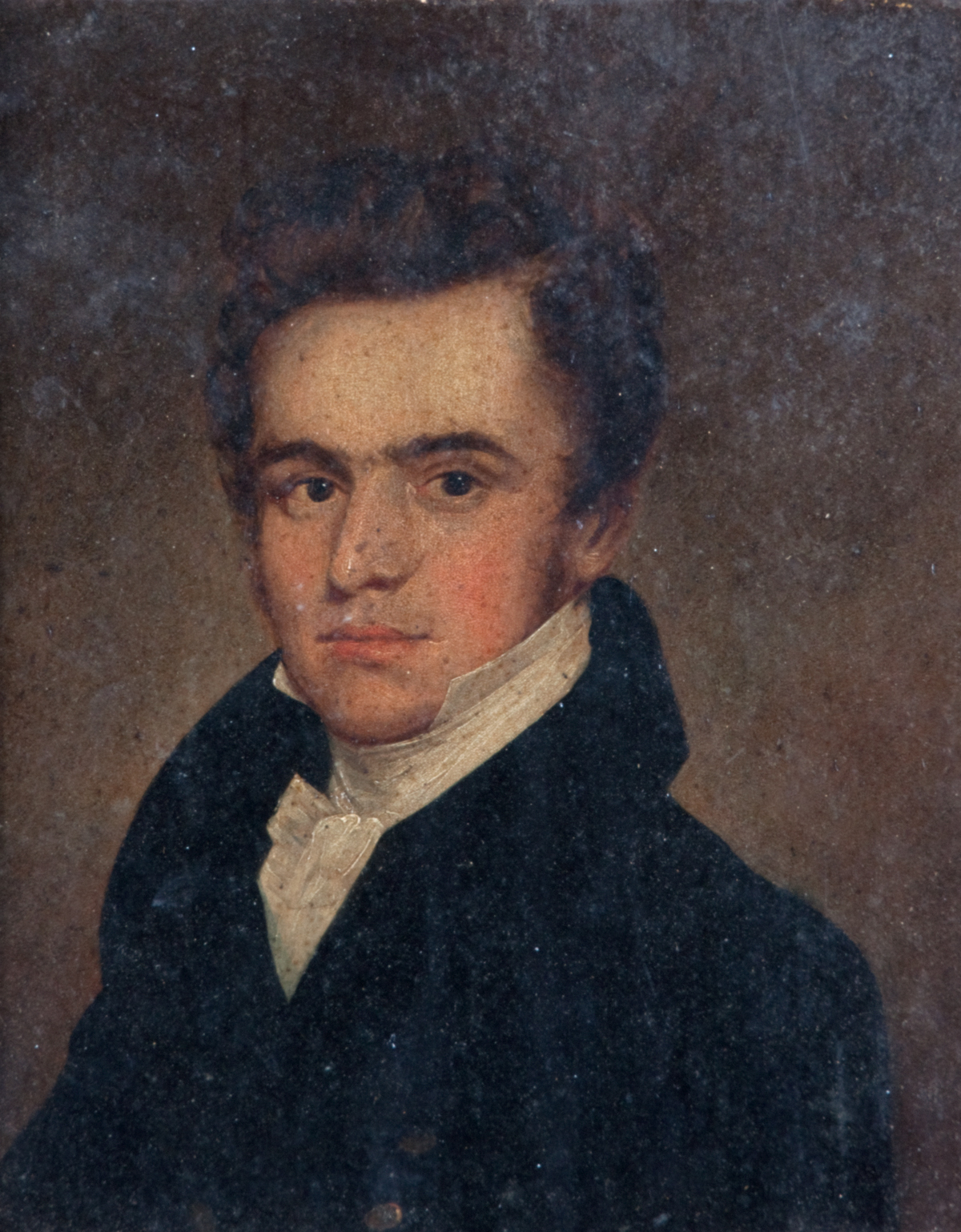
Price in 1822, whilst at medical school

William Price was born in a cottage at the farm Ty'n-y-coedcae ('the smallholding of the hedged field', tyddyn + y + coetgae) near Rudry near Caerphilly in Glamorganshire on 4 March 1800. His father, also named William Price (b. 1761), was an ordained priest of the Church of England who had studied at Jesus College, Oxford. It is believed that he was a descendent of Ellis Price, the grandchild of Rhys Fawr ap Maredudd, a Welsh nobleman chiefly known for his valour at the Battle of Bosworth Field in 1485, where he fought on the side of Henry VII. His mother, Mary Edmunds (1767–1844), was an uneducated Welshwoman who had worked as a maidservant for his paternal grandmother prior to his parents' marriage. Their marital union was controversial because Mary was of a lower social standing than William, something which was socially taboo in late 18th-century British society. They married at Machen church. In a South Wales Star article on 27 January 1793, children of the congregation recalled that after the procession, William's father (who was full of glee) ran onto the road dancing and pointing her out, shouted: "Dwi wedi ei ddwyn hi!, edrychwch!, edrychwch!" ("I have taken her, look!, look!.") . The couple had three other surviving children, Elisabeth (1793–1872), Mary (1797–1869) and Ann (1804–1878).

The elder Price suffered from an undiagnosed mental illness, acting erratically and experiencing fits of violent rage. He bathed either fully clothed or naked in local ponds, and collected snakes in his pockets for days at a time. Carrying a saw around, he removed bark from trees, then burned it while muttering certain words, also spitting onto stones, believing that it improved their value. His actions led to him becoming a threat to the local community; in one instance he fired a gun at a woman whom he claimed was taking sticks from his hedgerow, and in another hurled a sharp implement at another man.

At home, Welsh was William's primary language, but he learned to speak English at school, which was located two miles from his home, in Machen. Although only staying at school for three years, between the ages of 10 and 13, he passed most exams and proved himself a successful student. After spending six months living at home, he decided to become a doctor despite his father's insistence that he become a solicitor. Moving to Caerphilly, in 1814 he became apprenticed to successful surgeon Evan Edwards, and paid for his tuition with money supplied by various family members. One of these benefactors, his uncle the Reverend Thomas Price of Merriott, Somerset, advised him to give up this education, arguing that it was putting too great a financial strain upon Price's family, but William was insistent that he should continue.

In 1820, Price's apprenticeship with Edwards came to an end, and despite his lack of funds, he moved to London in order to continue his studies. Taking up lodgings near to St Paul's Cathedral, he entered The London Hospital in Whitechapel for a year of instruction under Sir William Blizard. He also registered at St Bartholomew's Hospital, where he was under the instruction of surgeon John Abernethy. Gaining employment caring for wealthy clients to help financially support his studies, Price eventually became a member of the Royal College of Surgeons of England, being awarded with a certificate signed by Blizard, Abernathy and others. Contemplating travelling to India following the culmination of his studies in London, he instead decided to return to Wales, where he worked as a general practitioner.

=== Welsh nationalism and Chartism: 1821–1839 ===
Early in his career, Price returned to Wales, where he was employed at Pentyrch Ironworks as a medical attendant. At this time he lived at a property nearby which he named Ynys y Llewod Duon ('island of the black lions') which was sometimes referred to as the 'Ynys house'.

Becoming a trained doctor, he then set up his medical practice at Craig yr Helfa in Glyntaff, remaining there for seven years.

He later rented a farm in Upper Boat called Porth y Glo ('coal port') which was owned by the son of a solicitor, Mr Grover. Price filled his farm with goats and cattle which ate and inflicted considerable damage to green trees around the property and throughout the neighbourhood, which prompted his landlord to serve him an eviction notice, which William dismissed. Mr Grover initiated an action of ejection after Price refused to leave. As a consequence and with "intense popular excitement", all of his animals were set loose onto the highway. Price, who was protesting his right to stay, secured himself onto his chair in the furthest room in the house refusing to leave, was carried out in his chair and was then placed outside on the road.

He subsequently moved to the newly industrialised Taff Valley near to Pontypridd. It was here in 1823 that the workforce elected him to the position of chief surgeon at the Brown Lenox Chainworks in Pontypridd; he stayed in this job until 1871. In June 1823 he was also appointed medical advisor to the wealthy Crawshay family who owned the ironworks at Merthyr and Treforest. Spending time in Treforest, "a revolutionary town", he came under the increasing influence of left-wing political ideas. Being a proud Welsh nationalist, Price found likeminded friends in another wealthy family, the Guests, and gave a speech on Welsh history and literature at their Royal Eisteddfod in 1834, which Lady Charlotte Guest felt to be "one of the most beautiful and eloquent speeches that was ever heard". On the basis of it, he was invited to take up the job of judging the eisteddfod's bardic competition, with the prize being awarded to Taliesin Williams, son of famous druid and Welsh nationalist Iolo Morganwg.

An illustration of a Chartist riot.

Price became increasingly interested in Welsh cultural activities, which included those that had been influenced by the Neo-Druidic movement. During his life, due to his extensive research into druidism, he would often be confused with a Welsh bard; Evan Davies (Myfyr Morganwg). He joined the Society of the Rocking Stone, a Neo-Druidic group that met at the Y Maen Chwyf stone circle in Pontypridd, and by 1837 had become one of its leading members. To encourage the revival of Welsh culture, he gave lessons every Sunday in Welsh, which he feared was dying out with the spread of the English language. In 1838 he also called for the Society to raise funds to build a Druidical Museum in the town, the receipts from which would be used to run a free school for the poor. He was supported in this venture by Francis Crawshay, a member of the Crawshay family, but did not gain enough sponsors to allow the project to go ahead. In anger, he issued a statement in a local newspaper, telling the people that they were ignoring "your immortal progenitors, to whom you owe your very existence as a civilised people."

Meanwhile, Price's social conscience had led him to become a significant figure in the local Chartist movement, which was then spreading about the country, supporting the idea that all men should have the right to vote, irrespective of their wealth or social standing. Many of the Chartists in the industrial areas of southern Wales took up arms in order to ready themselves for revolution against the government, and Price aided them in gaining such weaponry. According to government reports, by 1839 he had acquired seven pieces of field artillery. That same year, the Newport Rising took place, when many of the Chartists and their working class supporters rose up against the authorities, only to be quashed by soldiers, who killed a number of the revolutionaries. Price had recognised that this would happen, and he and his supporters had not joined in with the rebellion on that day. Nonetheless, he also realised that the government would begin a crackdown of those involved in the Chartist movement in retaliation for the uprising, and so he fled to France, disguised as a woman, there he became fluent in French.

=== Life as an archdruid: 1840–1882 ===
It was while in temporary exile as a political dissident in Paris that Price visited the Louvre museum, where he experienced what has been described as "a turning-point in his religious life." He became highly interested in a stone with a Greek inscription that he erroneously felt depicted an ancient Celtic bard addressing the moon. He subsequently interpreted the inscription as a prophecy given by an ancient Welsh prince named Alun, declaring that a man would come in the future to reveal the true secrets of the Welsh language and to liberate the Welsh people; however, historian Ronald Hutton later remarked, "nobody else had heard of this person, or made (anything like) the same interpretation of the inscription". Nonetheless, Price felt that this prophecy applied to him and that he must return to Wales to achieve Welsh independence from the United Kingdom.

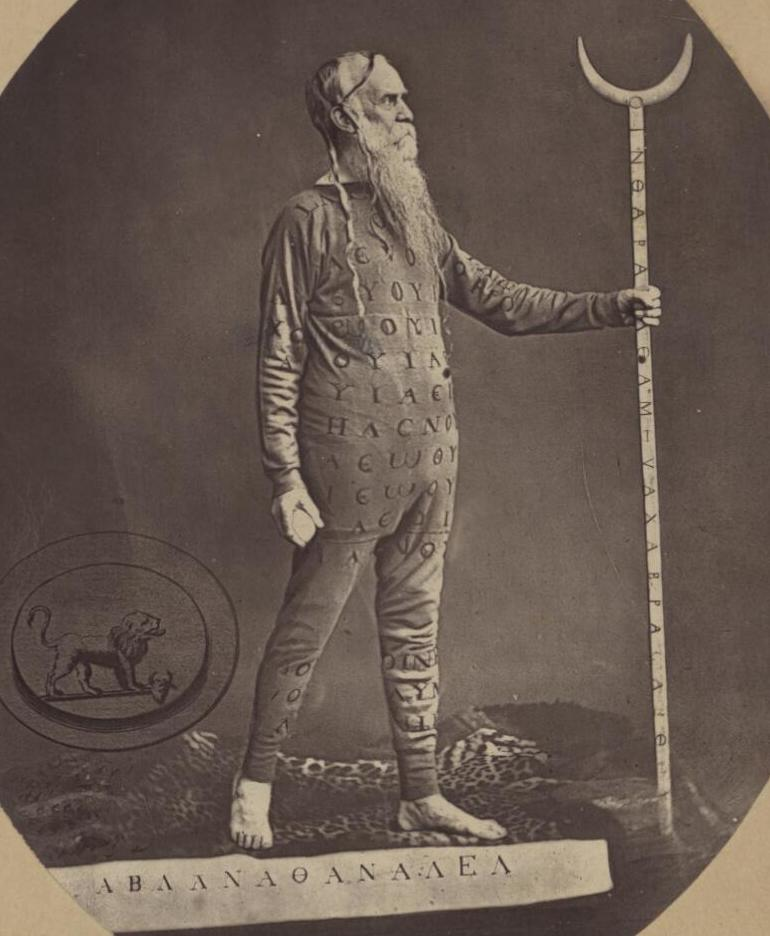
A photograph of Price taken while he was on stage in 1884. This displays some of his Druidic attire.

Soon returning to Wales, Price set himself up as a druid, founding a religious druidic group that attracted a number of followers. Little is known of the specific doctrines which he preached, but his followers walked around carrying staffs engraved with figures and letters. Declaring that marriage was wrong as it enslaved women, he began having a relationship with a woman named Ann Morgan, whom he moved in with, and in 1842 they had a daughter. He baptised this child himself at the Rocking Stone in Pontypridd, naming her Gwenhiolan Iarlles Morganwg (meaning 'Gwenhiolan, Countess of Glamorgan'). He began developing an appearance that was unconventional at the time, for instance wearing a fox fur hat (signifying his healing powers as a doctor) and emerald green clothing, as well as growing his beard long and not cutting his hair. He also began attempting to hold Druidic events, organising an eisteddfod at Pontypridd in 1844, but nobody turned up, and so, solitarily, he initiated his daughter as a bard at the event. In 1855 he then led a parade of the Ivorites, a friendly society that held to a philosophy of Welsh nationalism, through the streets of Merthyr Tydfil, accompanied by a half-naked man calling himself Myrddin (the Welsh name for Merlin) and a goat.

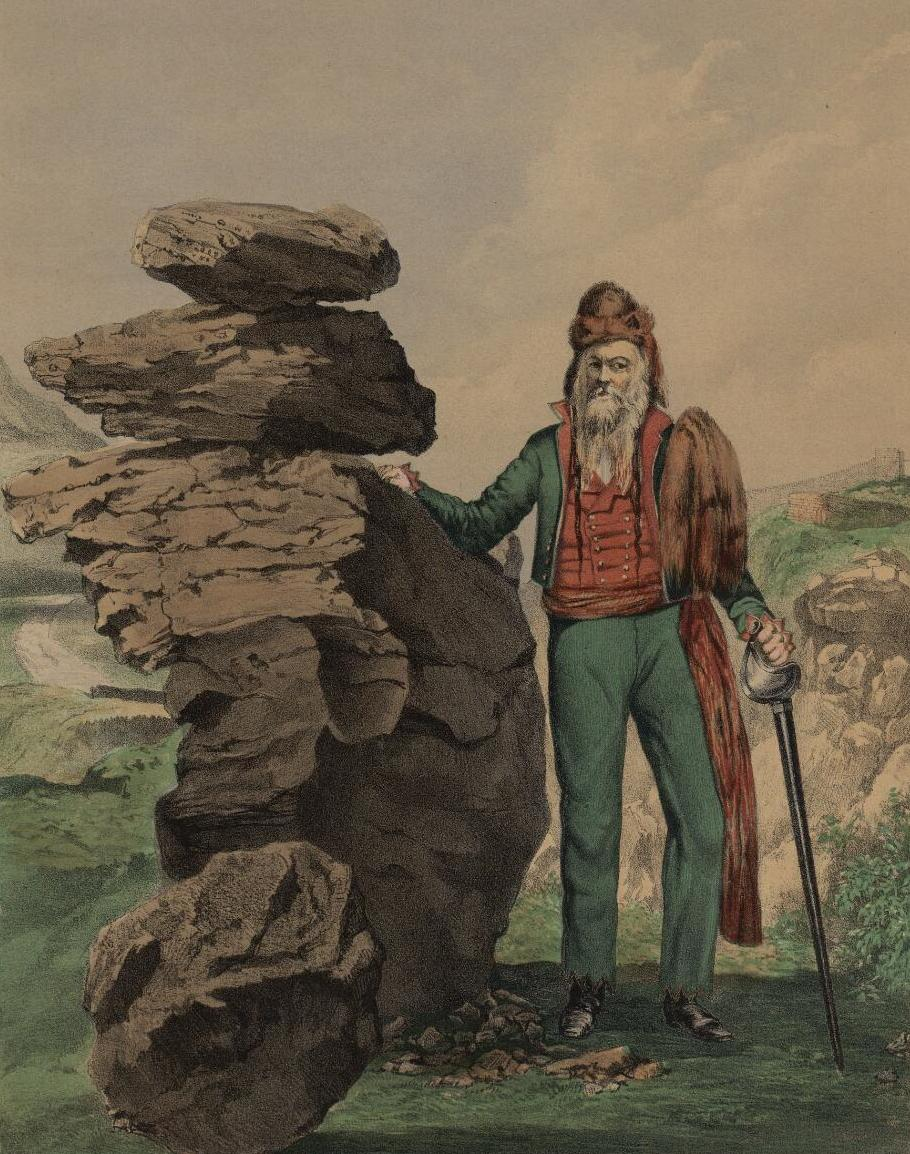
Portrait of William Price in 1861

Returning to his long-held idea of building a museum and school at Pontypridd, a local landowner, Sir Benjamin Hall, who wanted to encourage the revival of Welsh culture, allowed him to use his own land, although Price and the Halls subsequently fell out and the project was scrapped. Left with debts from the aborted project, Price once more escaped to France in 1861. Around this time, he began writing to the national press, making exaggerated statements about himself and Welsh history, for instance claiming that he was Lord of the Southern Welsh and that "All the Greek Books are the Works of the Primitive Bards, in our own Language!!!!!!!... Homer was born in the hamlet of Y Van near Caerphili. He built Caerphili Castle... the oldest Books of the Chinese confess the fact!!"

In 1866, Price returned to Wales, finding that his daughter had grown up to live her own life following her mother, Ann Morgan's, death. He settled in the town of Llantrisant, where he opened a new medical practice, which proved to be a success. He eventually took a young farmer's daughter, Gwenllian Llewelyn, (1859–1948) who at the time was only twenty-one years old, to be his new partner, despite the fact that he was an old man by this time. Despite his earlier pronouncements against marriage, he organised a druidic wedding ceremony through which he married Gwenllian on 4 March 1881, on Price's 81st birthday. Taking place at the Rocking Stone in Pontypridd, it involved Price addressing the sun at noon, and women dressed as the Three Graces were involved. The ceremony attracted a large audience, who, according to reports, found the whole proceeding amusing. Meanwhile, in 1871, he had published a book, written in his own invented form of Welsh that he believed was the true language of the ancient Welsh. In the work, which had a title that translated as The Will of My Father, Price conceptualised the universe being created out of a snake's egg by a supreme Father God. However, this work was largely ignored at the time and soon fell into obscurity.

=== Later life and advocacy of cremation: 1883–1893 ===
"Down to the time of his death his features retained striking characteristics. and old age had invested them with much dignity. His two eyes resembled those of a hawk; his nose was slightly aquiline in shape, and his forehead was broad and lofty. He kept all his beard, and it grew in shape something similar to a goatee and reaching down to his breast. It was silken and perfectly white. His hair, also white as snow was likewise allowed to grow long, and it was plaited in long skeins, the ends of which were looped up about the lower parts of his head. But his remarkable eccentricities through all periods of his long life left, no doubt, in the minds of those who knew him intimately that his brain was seriously affected. it seemed as if his great natural gifts were always struggling with "a mind diseased," but as far as is known he could satisfactorily command his mind in the exercise of his profession."

— South Wales Star – Friday 27 January 1893

Price proclaimed himself a 'High priest of the sun grown old' and via a 'druidic prophecy' and feeling dissatisfied that he had not produced a son that would succeed him, he sought out a virgin to copulate with; Gwenllian (or shortened to 'Gwen'), was chosen as his new partner. Gwen and Price's first child was born on 8 August 1883, a son whom Price named Iesu Grist (the Welsh for Jesus Christ) because he deemed him to be a young Esus or Hu Gadarn of Britain. He expected great things from his child and some believed that the chosen name was an act of provocation against the traditional religion of the time. The infant only lived for five months when on 10 January 1884 he died from an unknown cause. Believing that it was wrong to bury a corpse, thereby polluting the earth, Price decided to cremate his son's body, an act which at the time was taboo, although across the country there were already several proponents of it as a form of corpse disposal. On the afternoon of Saturday, 12 January 1884, men who had been employed by Price carted wood, coal and a cask of pitch to the top of the (Caerlan) hill east of Llantrisant which Price owned. In the evening of the following day, wearing white robes, he carried his son in his arms up towards the summit, placed his body down on the heap with his head facing the West, Price chanted 'a strange requiem' and then proceeded the funeral by setting the pile on fire. A number of local people who were on their way back home from church noticed the fire who then congregated around it, it was said that it was a moving sight, however upon discovering that Price was attempting to burn his infant son, Sergeant Tamblyn and his officers rushed through the crowd, snatched the baby from the fire, kicked the pile in the effort of extinguishing it and promptly arrested him for what they believed was the illegal disposal of a corpse. The body of his son, which had not yet been fully engulfed by the flames was removed from the pyre. The baby was placed in a hamper with straw in with his head facing downwards with his legs projecting upwards through the straw.

Price with his friend Robert Anderson, who later lit Price's funeral pyre

A post-mortem was performed on Iesu's body by a local doctor, who concluded that the child had died of natural causes and had not been murdered. Price was therefore not charged with infanticide, but was instead tried in a Cardiff courtroom for performing cremation rather than burial, which the police believed to be illegal. Price argued that while the law did not state that cremation was legal, it also did not state that it was illegal either. The judge, Mr. Justice Stephen, agreed. Price was freed, and returned to Llantrisant to find a crowd of supporters cheering for his victory. On 14 March, he was finally able to give his son a cremation involving his own personal Druidic prayers. The case set a precedent which, together with the activities of the recently founded Cremation Society of England, led to the Cremation Act 1902. In 1885 the first unchallenged cremation of the remains of Jeanette Pickersgill (1814–1885) took place at Woking Crematorium, and ten cremations are recorded as being performed in the following year. A crematorium opened in Manchester in 1892, followed by one in Glasgow in 1895, Liverpool in 1896 and Birmingham Crematorium in 1903.

The media interest in the court case had made Price famous, and he soon began to capitalise on this fame, selling three hundred medals, each depicting the cosmic egg and the snake that laid it, commemorating his victory, which sold at threepence each. He began to be invited to give lectures and attend public functions, but these did not prove to be particular successes, with much of his audiences not understanding either his philosophies, or his attire, which was made out of red cloth and embroidered with green letters.

In late 1884, Price's wife gave birth to their second child, whom Price also named Iesu Grist, and on 27 May 1886 she then bore him a daughter, whom they named Penelopen. He believed that his son had an important future ahead of him, being the prophesied second coming of Jesus Christ, his namesake, and predicted that he would come to reign over the earth. Gwen separated from William a few years before his death but continued looking after their children. Meanwhile, in 1892 he erected a pole which was over 60 feet high, with a crescent moon symbol at its peak, on top of Caerlan hill where his first son had been cremated, and noted that he wanted his funeral to take place there as well.

Price died at his home in Llantrisant on the night of 23 January 1893. His final words, when he knew that he was near death, were "Bring me a glass of champagne". He drank the champagne and died shortly afterward. On 31 January 1893, Price was cremated on a pyre of a timber core and two tons of coal, in accordance with his will, on the same hillside overlooking Llantrisant. It was watched by 20,000 people, and overseen by his family, who were dressed in a mix of traditional Welsh and his own Druidic clothing, it was noted, as accordance to his will and testament, that; 'no attempt shall be made to preserve the ashes of the body, but that they shall be "spread all over the earth to help the grass and flower to grow"'. His wife remarried, this time to a road inspector employed by the local council, and she gave up her Druidic beliefs to join a conventional Christian denomination, having her two children baptised into it, and Iesu Grist was renamed Nicholas, never fulfilling the ambitious predictions that his father had made about him.

== Personal beliefs ==
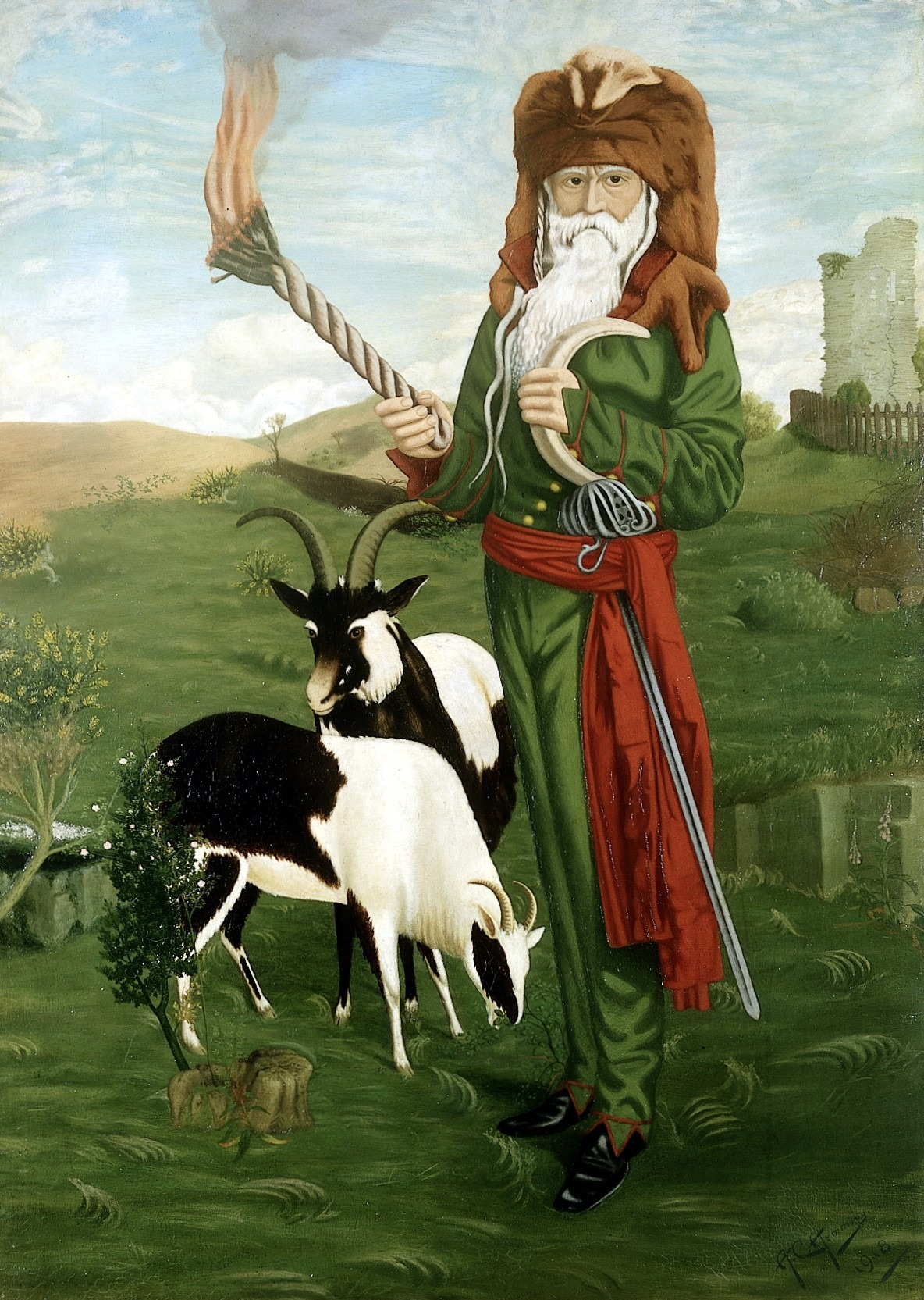
Oil painting of Price by A. C. Hemming, 1918 (on display at the Wellcome Collection in London)

Price held several strongly held beliefs that ran counter to the Victorian social norms of the time, and chose to promote them in a "most exhibitory fashion". Biographer Dean Powell considered him "a maverick and a rebel", but was unsure whether Price's eccentricity were a result of mental illness or not.

A nudist, Price refused to wear socks, considering them to be unhygienic, and washed coins, fearing that they were a source of cross-contamination. He opposed vaccination, in part due to his brother's childhood death following an inoculation, and refused to treat patients who were tobacco smokers. He advocated vegetarianism, believing that eating meat "brought out the beast in man", and denounced vivisection. Price opposed marriage, which he saw as the enslavement of women, instead advocating free love. Price also argued many fellow practitioners were nothing but 'poison peddlers', making their money selling drugs and profiting off the sick rather than tackling the cause of the illness.

Price was also responsible for the building of the famous "Round houses" in Pontypridd. He convinced a local builder that he owned the land and these round houses were to be the gateway to his mansion, although he owned neither the land nor a mansion.

Price believed that religion was often used to enslave people, and despised "sanctimonious preachers". His religious beliefs have influenced the modern druidic movement. Michell referred to him as "a natural shaman".

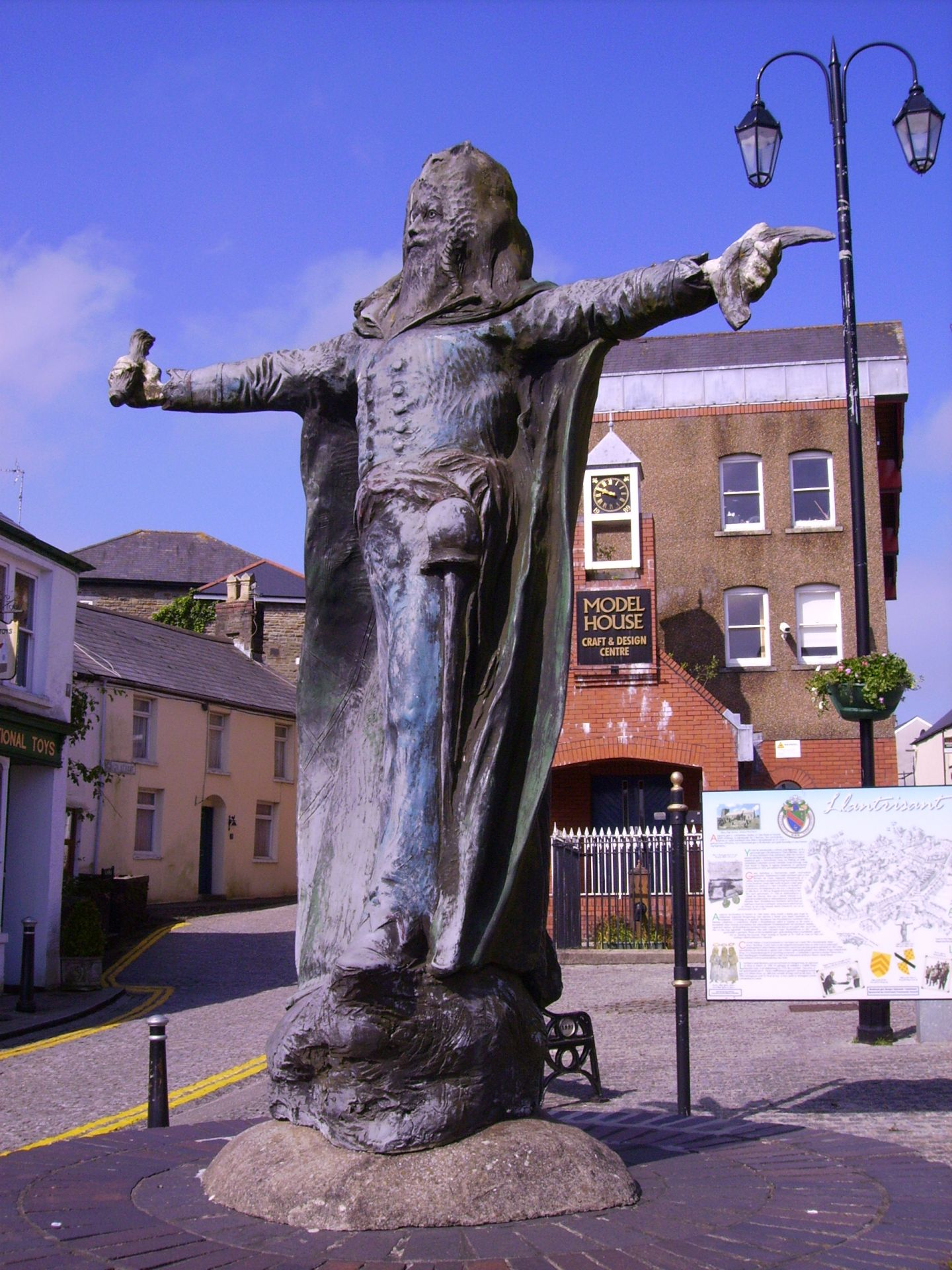
Statue of William Price in the Bull Ring, Llantrisant

== Legacy ==
Soon after Price's death, ballads commemorating him were composed and circulated throughout the local area for a number of years afterward. In 1896, an exhibition that commemorated his life was held in Cardiff, while a pamphlet biography of him was published to accompany it. A more significant biography of Price, written by Islwyn Nicholas, was published in 1940, entitled A Welsh Heretic. In 1947, the Cremation Society put up a plaque commemorating him in the town of Llantrisant, while a statue of him was unveiled in the town in 1982, depicting the doctor in his characteristic fox-skin headdress, arms outstretched. This was followed in 1992 when a memorial garden was named after him, and an exhibition about him opened in the town's visitor centre.

In a 1966 book examining the history of Llantrisant, author Dillwyn Lewis described Price as being "one of the most controversial figures of modern times." The historian Ronald Hutton later described him as "both one of the most colourful characters in Welsh history, and one of the most remarkable in Victorian Britain" while his biographer Dean Powell considered him "the most notable individual in 19th century Wales".

A commemorative green plaque was installed at Rudry Parish Hall in 2017 near Price's birthplace.

In 2020, American actor Robert Downey Jr. cited Price as his inspiration for his portrayal of Dr Dolittle in the new Hollywood adaption Dolittle. Downey received harsh criticism for his Welsh accent in the film. As journalist Will Humphries commented in The Sunday Times: "... when a Hollywood actor tries to do so in a Welsh accent inspired by a nudist Victorian druid, perhaps it's best that he doesn't speak at all."
