= Gorin, Volgograd Oblast =

Gorin Горин
- Khutor
- Location within Volgograd Oblast Location within Russia
- Coordinates: 50°15′N 43°51′E
- Country: Russia
- Region: Volgograd Oblast
- District: Danilovsky District
- Time zone: UTC+4:00

Gorin (Russian: Горин) is a rural locality (a khutor) in Sergiyevskoye Rural Settlement, Danilovsky District, Volgograd Oblast, Russia. The population was 110 as of 2010. There are 5 streets.

== Geography ==
Gorin is located in steppe, 3 km from the Medveditsa River, 33 km southwest of Danilovka (the district's administrative centre) by road. Sergiyevskaya is the nearest rural locality.
