= Paolo Gorini =

Italian mathematician, scientist and politician (1813–1881)

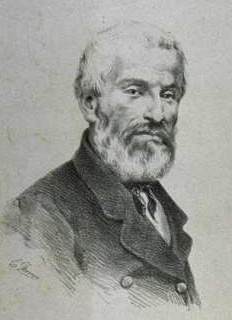

Personal details
- Born: 18 January 1813 Pavia, Habsburg Empire
- Died: 2 February 1881 (aged 67) Lodi, Kingdom of Italy
- Education: University of Pavia
- Profession: Professor and scientist

Paolo Gorini (18 January 1813 – 2 February 1881) was an Italian mathematician, professor, scientist, and politician renowned as a pioneer of cremation in Europe, primarily in the United Kingdom.

== Biography ==
Born in Pavia, Gorini obtained a bachelor's degree in mathematics at the University of Pavia in 1832 and subsequently moved to Lodi in 1834, where he worked as lecturer of physics in the local lyceum. There he achieved noteworthy discoveries about organic substances. Gorini became interested in politics at a very young age and joined the emerging Italian nationalist movement during the First Italian War of Independence.

After the Five Days of Milan (1848), he fled to Switzerland and was further exiled to London, England, where he continued his eclectic studies in natural sciences (anatomy, biology, chemistry, geology, and physiology). Back in Lodi, in 1871, he published Sull'origine del vulcani ("On the Origin of Volcanoes") and, in 1872, he became famous for the embalming of the bodies of Giuseppe Mazzini and Giuseppe Rovani.

In 1878, he was commissioned by the Cremation Society of Great Britain to construct the cremator at Woking Crematorium in England. He died in Lodi in 1881; following a civil ceremony, his remains were cremated and buried in the local cemetery of Riolo. A monument and a museum are dedicated to him in Lodi. In 2021, the documentary film Il mago di Lodi ("The wizard of Lodi") dedicated to his life and works as embalmer was directed by Silvia Onegli and produced by Magestic Film.

== Bibliography ==
- Cesare Vignati, Sopra alcune divulgatissime mummificazioni e sul nuovo trovato del professore Paolo Gorini, memoria, Milano-Lodi, C. Wilmant, 1847;
- Paolo Gorini, Autobiografia, Dossi-Perelli-Levi editori, Roma, 1881.
- Secondo Cremonesi, Studio su Gorini, sue opere, suoi lavori, Lodi, Tip. C. Dell'Avo, 1883.
- Piera Andreoli, Cenni biografici e attività scientifica di Paolo Gorini (1813-1881), Biancardi, Lodi, 1931.
- Antonio Allegri, Conservazione e dissolvimento della sostanza organica nell'opera goriniana, in "Archivio Storico Lodigiano", 2sem., XI, 1963, pp. 77–94.
- Pietro M. Erba, L'opera scientifica di Paolo Gorini, in idem, pp. 95–110.
- Luigi Samarati, Paolo Gorini: l'uomo e i tempi, in idem, pp. 111–145.
- Antonio Allegri, Il Museo Paolo Gorini, Lodi, Lodigraf, 1982.
- Angelo Stroppa, Statuto e regolamento dell'Associazione di cremazione "Paolo Gorini", La Grafica, Lodi, 1999.
- AA. VV., Paolo Gorini. Scienziato a Lodi nell'Ottocento, Cd-Rom, a cura di Maria Canella e Giorgia Simonetta, Provincia di Lodi, Lodi, 1999.
- Sergio Luzzatto, La mummia della Repubblica. Storia di Mazzini imbalsamato, Rizzoli, Milano, 2000.
- Alberto Carli, Carlo Dossi e Paolo Gorini. Letteratura e scienza scapigliata, in "Rendiconti dell'Istituto Lombardo Accademia di Scienze e Lettere", 135, 2001, fasc. II, pp. 327–360.
- Alberto Carli, Storia di una salma. Giuseppe Rovani, Carlo Dossi e Paolo Gorini, in "Testo. Studi di teoria e storia della letteratura e della critica", 44, XXIII, 2002, pp. 75–86.
- Alberto Carli, Anatomie scapigliate. L'estetica della morte tra letteratura, arte e scienza, Interlinea, Novara, 2004.
- AA. VV., Storia di uno scienziato. La collezione anatomica Paolo Gorini, a cura di Alberto Carli, Bolis, Azzano San Paolo (BG), 2005.
- Alberto Carli, I manoscritti di Luigi Rovida e le formule segrete di Paolo Gorini, in "Studi Tanatologici", 1, 1, 2005.
- Angelo Stroppa, Il mito di Paolo Gorini fra cronaca, storia e attualità, in AA. VV., Storia di uno scienziato..., cit., pp. 113–133.
- Guido Broich, Prefazione, in AA. VV., Storia di uno scienziato..., cit., pp. 7–13.
- Alberto Carli,Guida storica alla Collezione anatomica Paolo Gorini, Comune di Lodi, Lodi, 2009.
- Alberto Carli, Paolo Gorini. La fiaba del mago di Lodi, a cura di Matteo Schianchi, Interlinea, Novara, 2009 (Strenna del Consiglio Comunale di Lodi - edizione fuori commercio).
- Alberto Carli e Angelo Stroppa (a cura di), Paolo Gorini, Autobiografia, Limina Mantis, Villasanta, 2010 (Ristampa anastatica della princeps del 1881).
