= Woking Crematorium =

Crematorium in Woking, Surrey, England

Coordinates: 51.3118°N 0.6027°W

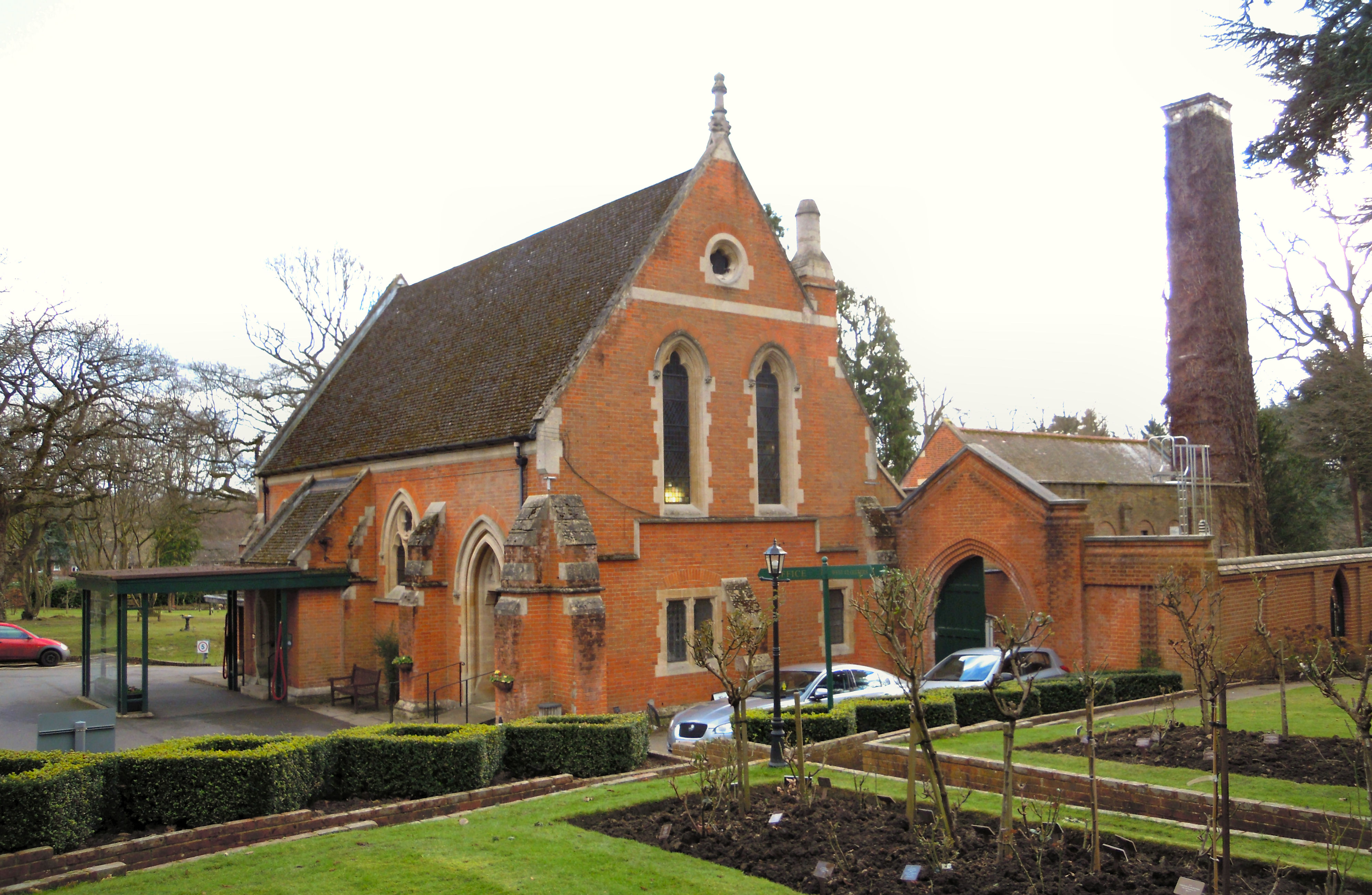
- Woking Crematorium in 2018
- Interactive map of the Woking Crematorium area

General information
- Type: Crematorium
- Location: Hermitage Road, Woking, England
- Opened: 1878

Woking Crematorium is a crematorium in Woking, a large town in the west of Surrey, England. Established in 1878, it was the first custom-built crematorium in the United Kingdom and is closely linked to the history of cremation in the UK.

== Location ==
The crematorium is in Woking, just outside St John's Village on Hermitage Road. Brookwood Cemetery, also known as the London Necropolis, is nearby but operated separately.

== History ==
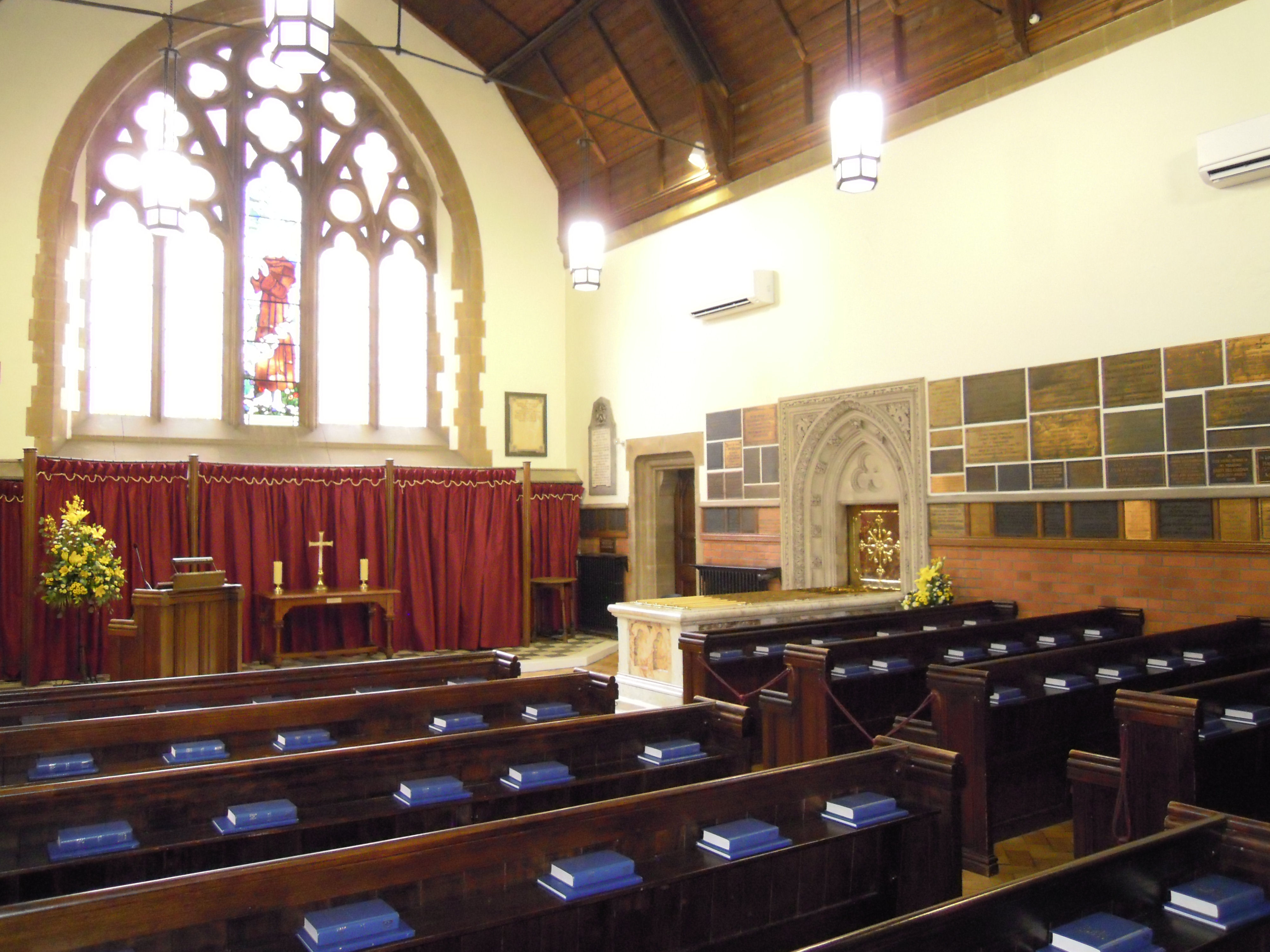
The interior of the chapel

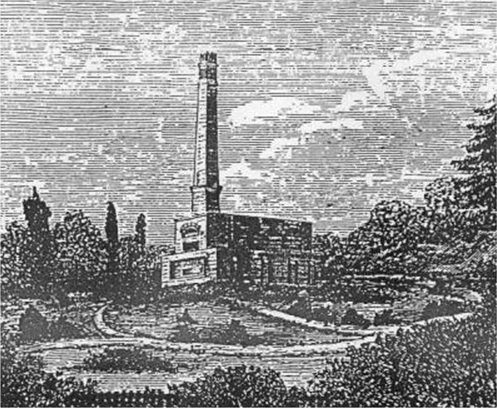
The cremator at Woking Crematorium in the 1870s, before the chapel and buildings were constructed

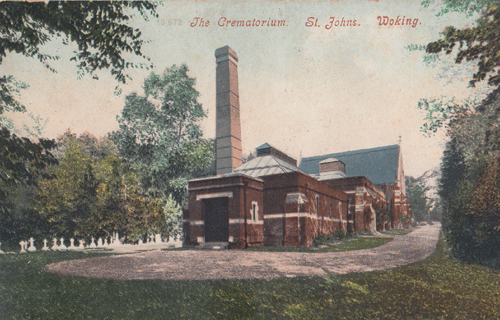
Woking Crematorium in the early 20th century

Woking Crematorium was founded in 1878, when a piece of land close to St John's Village was bought by Sir Henry Thompson. He was a surgeon and Physician to the Queen. In 1874, he was a founder and first president of the Cremation Society of England. The one acre (0.4 hectares) of land on which the crematorium was to be established was purchased from the London Necropolis Company with the aid of subscriptions (at £200 each). It was both secluded yet readily accessible, as the London Necropolis Railway, suitable for the conveyance of the dead, already ran between London Waterloo Station and Woking. The cremator was constructed by Professor Paolo Gorini of Lodi, Italy. It was not initially enclosed in a building but stood in the open air in the crematorium grounds.

The new crematorium was first tested on 17 March 1879, when the body of a horse was cremated. The inhabitants of Woking showed strong antipathy to the crematorium and some appealed to the Home Secretary, Sir Richard Cross, to prohibit the use of the facility. The Woking cremator could not be used for human remains until after cremation was declared to be lawful in February 1884, as the result of the trial of Dr. William Price.

On 26 March 1885, the first official cremation in the UK took place in Woking. The deceased was Mrs Jeannette C. Pickersgill, whom The Times described as "a well-known figure in literary and scientific circles". By the end of the year, the Cremation Society of England had overseen two more cremations, a total of three out of 597,357 deaths in Great Britain and Ireland that year.

In 1886 ten bodies were cremated at Woking Crematorium. During 1888, in which 28 cremations took place, the Cremation Society planned to provide a chapel, waiting-rooms and other amenities there. The subscription list was headed by the Dukes of Bedford and Westminster. The Duke of Bedford later donated money to complete the buildings and to purchase ground adjacent to the property. The buildings were designed by an ecclesiastical architect in the character of English thirteenth-century Gothic. The churchlike appearance was intended to make the building look reassuring to the public at a time when cremation was an alien custom. The chapel was available for use in January 1891.

In 1892, 104 cremations were carried out at Woking. In 1902, the first crematorium was opened in London (Golders Green Crematorium). By 1911, the original one-acre (0.4-hectare) site at Woking was extended to ten acres (four hectares) and a Garden of Remembrance added.

Elected president of the Cremation Society in 1921, the 11th Duke of Bedford had the original cremator from Woking transferred to a new chapel at Golders Green Crematorium, where it was later used for his own cremation in 1940.

== Cremations ==
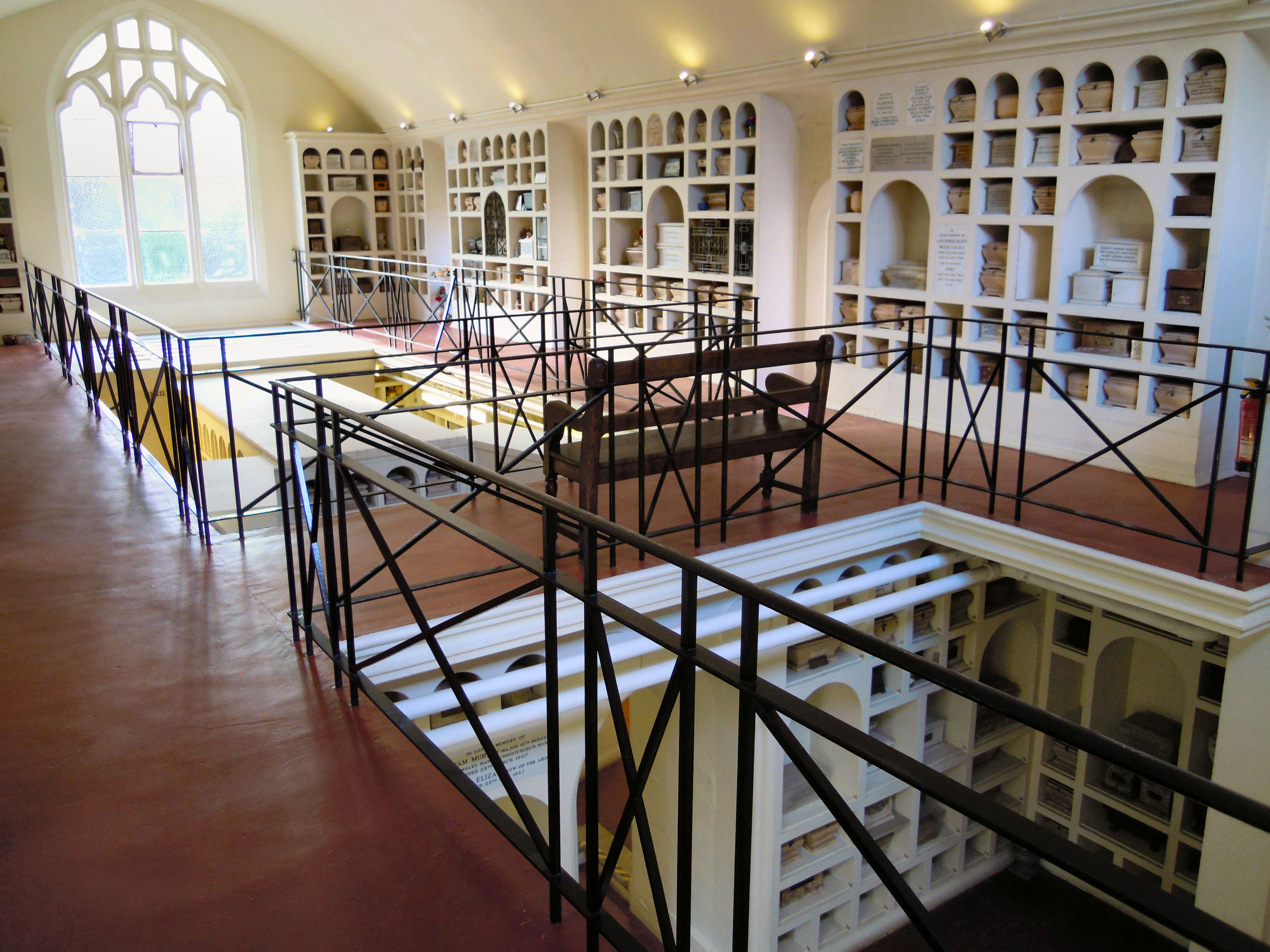
View of the Columbarium

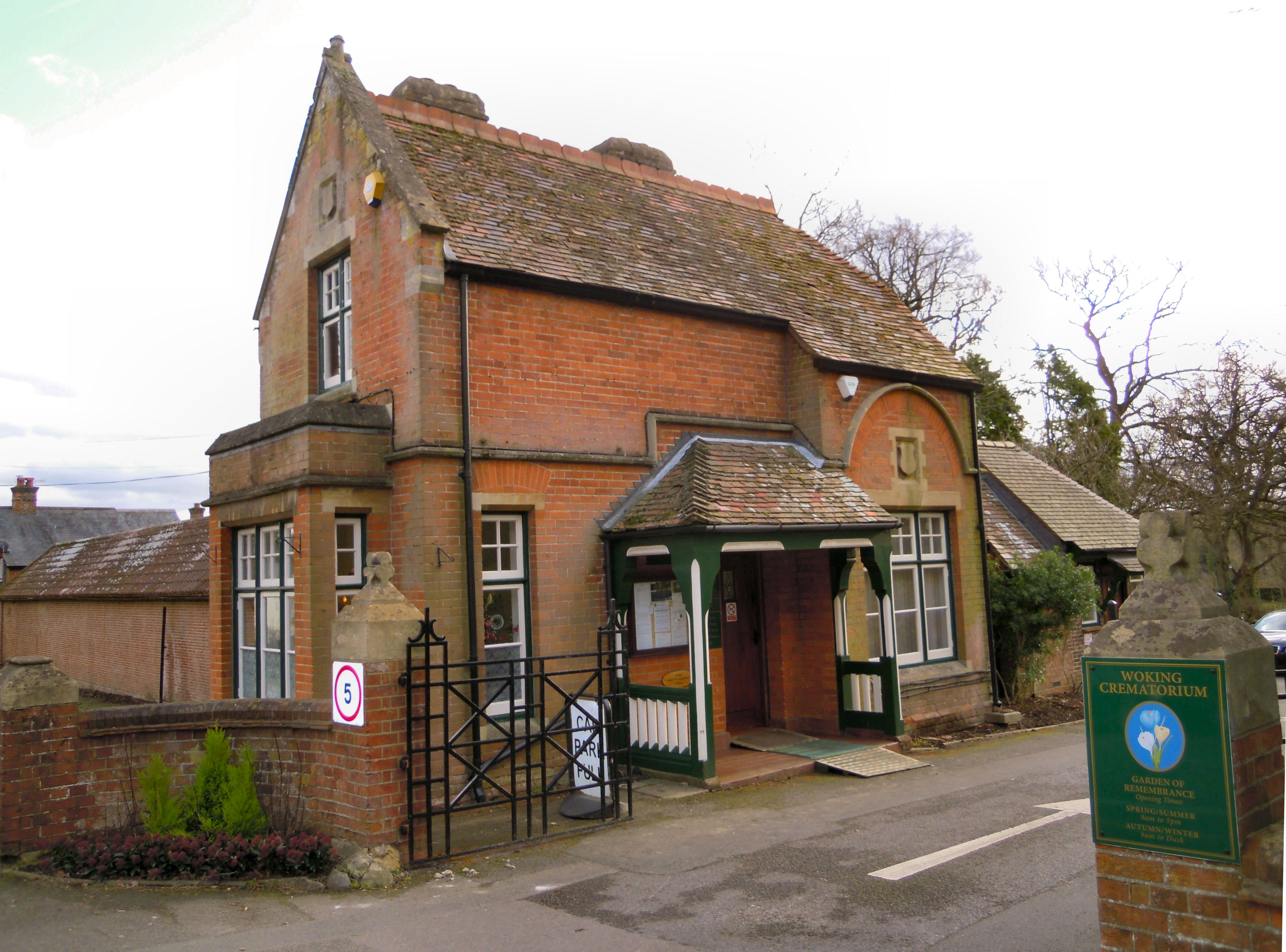
The Office at Woking Crematorium

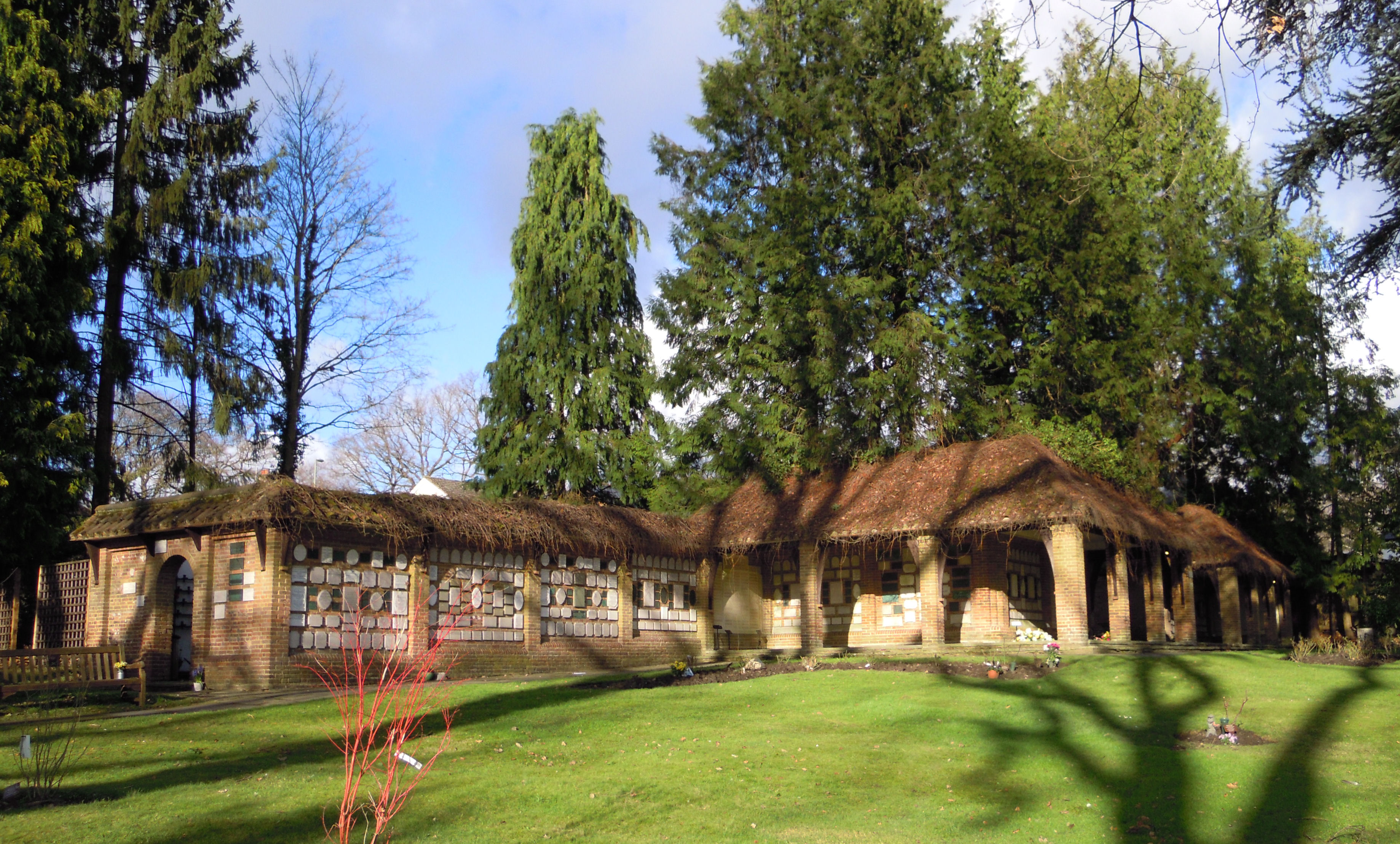
The West Cloister

Among those cremated here are:

- Helena Blavatsky, died 1891, founder of the Theosophical Society (ashes given to the Theosophical Society)
- Mathilde Blind, died 1896, writer (ashes placed in a monument in St Pancras Cemetery)
- James Spring Branson, died 1897, Advocate General of the Madras Presidency.
- Samuel Butler, died 1902, novelist (ashes buried, or scattered, at Woking Crematorium)
- Bernard Cribbins, died 2022, actor
- Edward Frederick Crippin, died 1892, businessman
- John Douglas, 9th Marquess of Queensberry, died 1900 (ashes buried at Kinmount, Dumfriesshire)
- Michael Dunford, died 2012, guitarist with Renaissance
- Friedrich Engels, died 1895, philosopher (ashes scattered off Beachy Head, Sussex)
- John Galsworthy, died 1933, novelist and playwright (ashes scattered on South Downs)
- Hugh Grosvenor, 1st Duke of Westminster, died 1899 (ashes buried at St Mary's Church, Eccleston, Cheshire)
- Thomas Hardy, died 1928, writer (ashes buried at Westminster Abbey, heart at St Michael's Church, Stinsford, Dorset)
- Florence Hardy (née Dugdale), died 1937, writer, widow of Thomas Hardy (ashes buried at St Michael's Church, Stinsford, Dorset)
- William Ernest Henley, died 1903, poet (ashes buried at Cockayne Hatley, Bedfordshire)
- Sir John Walter Huddleston, died 1890, judge (ashes returned to family).
- Ralph King-Milbanke, 2nd Earl of Lovelace, died 1906, author (ashes buried at Ockham, Surrey)
- Eleanor Marx, died 1898 (ashes buried next to her father's grave at Highgate Cemetery in London in 1956)
- Eadweard Muybridge, died 1904, early pioneer of photography and murderer
- Maud Naftel, died 1890, watercolour flower painter
- Sir John Pretyman Newman, died 1947, Conservative politician and British Army officer.
- Rick Parfitt, died 2016, guitarist with Status Quo
- Francis Russell, 9th Duke of Bedford, died 1891 (ashes buried at St. Michael's Church, Chenies, Buckinghamshire)
- Elizabeth Russell, Duchess of Bedford, died 1897 (ashes buried at St. Michael's Church, Chenies, Buckinghamshire)
- Philip Snowden, 1st Viscount Snowden, died 1937 (ashes scattered on Cowling Moor near Ickornshaw, Yorkshire)
- Julian Sturgis, died 1904 poet, lyricist and librettist (ashes buried at Compton Cemetery, Surrey)
- George Tomline, died 1889, politician (ashes sent to London)
- Alan Turing, died 1954, known as father of computer science (ashes scattered at Woking Crematorium)
- Beatrice Webb, died 1943, labour historian and social reformer (ashes buried at Westminster Abbey in 1947)
- Frank Worsley, died 1943, Antarctic explorer (ashes scattered at mouth of the River Thames

Thirteen holders of the Victoria Cross are recorded to have been cremated here.

There were 137 Commonwealth service personnel from both World Wars cremated here. A memorial panel fixed onto the wall of the columbarium by the Commonwealth War Graves Commission lists the names. Numbers after some entries indicate niches in the columbarium, in other cases the ashes were scattered.
