= List of computer magazines =

This is a list of magazines marketed primarily for computer and technology enthusiasts or users. The majority of these magazines cover general computer topics or several non-specific subject areas, however a few are also specialized to a certain area of computing and are listed separately.

== General magazines ==
These publications appeal to a broad audience and usually include content about computer hardware and software and technology news. These magazines could also be called technology magazines because of the large amount of content about non-computer consumer electronics, such as digital audio player and mobile phones.

=== Bi-monthly ===
- Component Developer Magazine (CODE)

=== Monthly ===
- APC (Australia)
- Computer Buyer (UK)
- Computer Shopper (UK)
- Computer Shopper (US)
- Digit (India)
- PC/Computing
- PC Magazine
- PC Pro
- PC World
- PC Quest (India)
- Wired (US)
- iX (magazine) (Germany)
- Svet kompjutera (Serbia)

=== Fortnightly ===
- c't (Germany, Netherlands)
- Computeractive (United Kingdom)

=== Weekly ===
- Computer Weekly (United Kingdom)
- Computerra (Russia)
- Computing (United Kingdom)
- Micro Mart (United Kingdom)

=== Online-only ===
- Datamation, previously in print 1957–1998, the first computer magazine. (United States)

== Topic-specific magazines ==
These publications are marketed towards people who are interested in a specific topic of computing.

=== Amiga ===
- Amiga Action (United Kingdom) (discontinued)
- Amiga Addict (United Kingdom)
- Amiga Computing (United Kingdom, United States) (discontinued)
- Amiga Format (United Kingdom) (discontinued)
- Amiga Power (United Kingdom) (discontinued)

=== Cryptography ===
- Mondo 2000
- 2600: The Hacker Quarterly

=== Macintosh ===
- Call-A.P.P.L.E. (United States)
- MacTech (United States)
- MacFormat (United Kingdom)
- MacLife (Germany)
- MacLife, formally MacAddict (United States)
- MacUser (United Kingdom)
- Macworld (Australia, United States, Italy, Germany, Sweden, Spain, United Kingdom)

=== RISC OS/Acorn ===
- Acorn User (United Kingdom) (discontinued)
- Archive (United Kingdom)
- The Micro User (United Kingdom) (discontinued)
- Qercus (United Kingdom)

=== Web development ===
- .net (United Kingdom)
- PHP Architect (United States)

=== Computer modification ===
- Custom PC (United Kingdom)
- Maximum PC (United States) (discontinued)
- PC Extreme (United Kingdom) (discontinued)

=== Internet ===
- First Monday (Internet) (peer reviewed)
- Internet Magazine (United Kingdom) (discontinued)
- Spider (Pakistan) (discontinued)
- Webuser (United Kingdom) (discontinued)

=== Business ===
- eWeek (United States)
- InformationWeek (United States)
- InfoWorld (United States)

=== Music ===
- Computer Music (United Kingdom)

=== Mobile computing ===
- PC Today (United States)

=== Novice users ===
- First Glimpse (United States)

=== 1980s computers ===
The following magazines cover 1980s home computers such as the Amiga, Atari 8-bit, Commodore 64, ZX Spectrum or Amstrad CPC. Most of these magazines are now discontinued as the computers they discuss are now out of production.

Retro computer magazines
Title	Country	Availability	Notes
.info	United States, Canada	discontinued	
Acorn User	United Kingdom)	discontinued	
Amiga Addict	United Kingdom	Active	
Amiga Power	United Kingdom	discontinued	
Amiga Format	United Kingdom	discontinued	
Amiga Computing		discontinued	
Amiga Survivor		discontinued	
Amiga User International		discontinued	
Amiga World		discontinued	
Amstrad Action	United Kingdom	discontinued	
Amstrad Computer User	United Kingdom	discontinued	
Amtix!	United Kingdom	discontinued	
ANALOG Computing	United States	discontinued	
ANTIC	United States	discontinued	
Atari User	United Kingdom	discontinued	
Commodore User (renamed CU Amiga Magazine)		discontinued	
Computer Gamer	United Kingdom	discontinued	
Crash	United Kingdom	discontinued	
Dragon User	United Kingdom	discontinued	
Electron User	United Kingdom	discontinued	
Page 6	United Kingdom	discontinued	
Personal Computer Games	United Kingdom	discontinued	
Retrogamer	United Kingdom	Active	
Sinclair User	United Kingdom	discontinued	
The Micro User	United Kingdom	discontinued	
Your Computer	United Kingdom	discontinued	
Your Sinclair (originally Your Spectrum)	United Kingdom	discontinued	
Zzap!64	United Kingdom	discontinued	

=== Partworks ===
The following magazines were published as partworks:

- The Home Computer Advanced Course (United Kingdom) (1984–1985)
- The Home Computer Course (United Kingdom) (1983–1984)
- PC Ace (United Kingdom) (1999–2001)

=== Linux and open-source ===
The following magazines cover topics related to the Linux operating system (as well as other Unix based operating systems) and other forms of open-source/ free software. Some of these magazines are targeted at IT professionals (with an emphasis on the use of these systems in the workplace) whilst others are designed for home users.

- Free Software Magazine (Internet)
- Full Circle
- LinuxFocus
- Linux Format (United Kingdom)
- Linux Gazette (Internet)
- Linux Journal (United States) (shutdown August 7, 2019)
- Linux Magazine (United Kingdom/Europe)
- Linux Magazine (United States)
- LinuxUser (Germany)
- Linux User and Developer (United Kingdom)
- Linux Voice (United Kingdom)
- Linux Weekly News (Internet)
- ;login:
- LWN.net
- MyLINUX (Romania)
- Open Source For You (India)

=== Artificial Intelligence ===
- AI Magazine
- Communications of the ACM

=== Sales ===
The following magazines cover computer, peripheral, software and service distribution, through all their aspects (marketing, strategy, channel, retail or wholesale).

- Channel World, Belgium, Czech Republic, India, Netherlands
- CRN Magazine, US, Europe and other countries
- IT Bransjen, Norway

== Academic journals ==
A number of journals are circulated in academic circles (normally associated with a governing body such as the Institute of Electrical and Electronics Engineers, IEEE). These may cover several different topics as well as computing and often deal with more technical aspects of hardware and software.

- ACM Computing Reviews (United States) (ACM)
- ACM Queue (United States) (ACM)
- ACM Transactions on Graphics (United States) (ACM)
- American Programmer (United States)
- C/C++ Users Journal (United States) (independent publisher, defunct)
- Computer (United States) (IEEE, Computer Society)
- Computer Graphics (United States) (ACM SIGGRAPH)
- Dr. Dobb's Journal (United States) (independent publisher, defunct)
- IEEE Internet Computing (United States) (IEEE, Computer Society)
- IEEE Intelligent Systems (United States) (IEEE, Computer Society)
- IEEE Micro (United States) (IEEE, Computer Society)
- IEEE MultiMedia (United States) (IEEE, Computer Society)
- IEEE Software (United States) (IEEE, Computer Society)
- Overload (United Kingdom) (ACCU)

== Other, now defunct, computer-related magazines ==
- .info
- Ahoy!
- Boot
- Byte
- C (Finland)
- C/C++ Users Journal
- C++ Report
- CD-ROM Today
- Compute!
- COMPUTE!'s Gazette
- Computer Decisions
- Creative Computing
- Electronics Today International, electronics magazine that also published early homebrew computer systems
- Family Computing (later Home Office Computing), home/educational-oriented magazine published by Scholastic, Inc.
- Games for Windows: The Official Magazine
- Hebdogiciel, French computing magazine from the 1980s
- Info Komputer (Indonesia)
- CHIP (India)
- IT-Branchen (Denmark)
- Kilobaud Microcomputing (United States)
- Microsystems
- New Computer Express (United Kingdom)
- Nibble
- PC Ace
- Personal Computer News (United Kingdom)
- Popular Computing Weekly (United Kingdom)
- The One
- The Rainbow
- RUN
- SunWorld, about Sun Microsystems computers (United States)
- UnixWorld, about Unix operating system (United States)
- Verbum, desktop publishing and computer art focused magazine of the 1990s
- Zero

== Computer magazine publishers ==
The following companies publish one or several computer related magazines. Some of these publishers produce computer magazines exclusively and most produce multiple magazines from this genre.

- Future plc (United Kingdom)
- Newsfield Publications (United Kingdom)
- Next Media (Australia)
- Sandhills Publishing Company (United States)

== See also ==
- List of computer books
- List of disk magazines
- List of engineering journals and magazines
- List of IEEE publications, List of IEEE magazines, and List of electrical engineering journals
- List of software programming journals
