= SmartComputing =

Smart Computing
- December 2010 cover
- Categories: Computer magazine
- Frequency: Monthly
- Publisher: Sandhills Publishing Company
- Founded: 1990
- Final issue: 2013
- Country: United States
- Based in: Lincoln, Nebraska
- Language: English
- ISSN: 1093-4170
- OCLC: 426077100

Smart Computing was a monthly computing and technology magazine published by Sandhills Publishing Company in Lincoln, Nebraska, USA. First released under the name PC Novice, it was published from 1990 to 2013.

== Content ==
The magazine featured articles, reviews of hardware and software, editorial content and classified advertising. It was geared more toward newer users than its sister publications, Computer Power User and CyberTrend (previously known as PC Today).

=== Articles and Features ===
- Technology News and Notes, by Christian Perry - News and a monthly Q/A help desk
- Tech Diaries, various authors - Reviews
- Software Head-to-Head, various authors - a comparison of software

- September 2006: Anti-Spam: eTrust AntiSpam, SonicWALL Email Security Desktop, OnlyMyEmail, VQme Anti Spam with Webmail. Winner: SonicWALL Email Security Desktop
- October 2006: Instant Messaging clients: Yahoo! Messenger 8, AIM Triton 1.5, Google Talk, ICQ 5.1, Trillian 3.1, Windows Live Messenger. Winner: Yahoo! Messenger
- January 2007: Office suites: StarOffice 8, Microsoft Office 2007 Home and Student Edition, Corel WordPerfect X3 Standard Edition, Ability Office Standard Edition. Winner: StarOffice 8

- Software Reviews, various
- Staff Picks, various - staff's choices of hardware
- Windows Tips & Tricks, various - helpful hints for using Microsoft Windows
- General Computing, various - articles about no specific topic

- Reader's Tips, by readers - readers give hints to other readers
- Learning Linux, by Vince Cogley, NEW COLUMN - teach yourself using Linux with the Ubuntu distribution

- Plugged In, various - tips on using the Internet
- Mr. Modem's Desktop, by Mr. Modem - various tips and Internet links
- Quick Studies, various - tips on and fixing problems with using very commonly used software
- Tidbits, by Marty Sems - information on new stuff
- Tech Support, various - consists of:

- What to Do When... - a guide on fixing road-block problems
- Examining Errors - the magazine helps readers with errors
- Fast Fixes - information on new software updates
- Q&A - answers to tech support questions
- FAQ - answers to frequently asked questions; each month all questions are about the same topic

- Action Editor, unknown - Action Editor comes to the rescue when companies deny service or give bad service
- Tales From The Trenches, by Gregory Anderson - his bad experiences when using computers and what to do about them if they happen to you
- Editorial License, by Rod Scher - description unknown

== See also ==
- Computer magazines
