= Senator Geist =

Senator Geist may refer to:

- George Geist (born 1955), New Jersey State Senate
- Suzanne Geist (born 1961), Nebraska State Senate
