= Kiss: Psycho Circus - The Nightmare Child =

2000 video game

- Developers: Third Law Interactive (PC); Tremor Entertainment (DC conversion)
- Publishers: Gathering of Developers (PC); Take-Two Interactive (DC)
- Platforms: Windows; Dreamcast
- Release: Windows: NA: July 24, 2000; UK: July 28, 2000; Collector's Edition: NA: July 20, 2000; Dreamcast: NA: November 1, 2000; PAL: January 19, 2001
- Genre: First-person shooter
- Modes: Single-player, multiplayer (PC version only)

Kiss: Psycho Circus - The Nightmare Child is a first-person shooter video game developed by American studio Third Law Interactive and published by Gathering of Developers for Microsoft Windows in July 2000. It was also released later that year for Dreamcast (using Windows CE) following a port by Tremor Entertainment.

== Gameplay ==
Kiss: Psycho Circus - The Nightmare Child unfolds as a first‑person shooter in which the player moves through a long series of levels filled with large groups of hostile creatures that must be defeated to progress. Weapons are collected over time, and most obstacles take the form of locked doors that require finding keys after clearing additional enemies. The structure repeats across corridors, hallways, and passages, with each stage following the same pattern of combat and item collection.

== Development ==
Kiss: Psycho Circus was the first game to be developed by Third Law Interactive, themselves having recently formed in December 1998 after a widely publicized mass walkout from Ion Storm. Versions for PlayStation and Game Boy Color were planned, but were later canceled. The PC version was also distributed with the November edition of Computer Buyer in 2000.

The game was exhibited during E3 1999 at Gathering of Developers' booth across the street from the event; alongside booth babes and live music, dwarves dressed as members of Kiss promoted the game.

== Reception ==
Reception

Aggregate score
Aggregator	Score	
Aggregator	Dreamcast	PC
Metacritic	59/100	71/100

Review scores
Publication	Score	
Publication	Dreamcast	PC
AllGame	2/5	3.5/5
CNET Gamecenter	5/10	6/10
Computer Games Strategy Plus	N/A	4/5
Computer Gaming World	N/A	3/5
Electronic Gaming Monthly	2/10	N/A
Eurogamer	N/A	9/10
Game Informer	4.5/10	N/A
GamePro	N/A	3/5
GameRevolution	N/A	C
GameSpot	4.5/10	6.6/10
GameSpy	N/A	70%
IGN	6.2/10	7/10
Next Generation	N/A	2/5
PC Gamer (US)	N/A	70%

The game received "mixed or average reviews" on both platforms according to the review aggregation website Metacritic. However, Jeff Lundrigan of NextGen said of the PC version, "To be fair, this title accomplishes what it set its sights to do. Trouble is, those sights weren't set very high. This will seem interesting only if the last game you ever played was Doom."

Kevin "BIFF" Giacobbi of GameZone gave the PC version nine out of ten, saying:

This game rocks! What I am most pleased with is the support that the web site offers. Not only is there a forum where gamers can post games and ask questions that the KPC staff can answer as well as fellow gamers. But let's go one step further. There is a live chat session between certain hours where you can ask questions via chat with some of the KPC staff ... Way impressed! Other games should follow this idea!

However, Edge gave it three out of ten, saying, "A lot like Kiss themselves, The Nightmare Child is comically frightening and utterly over the top. Just as aptly, underneath all the irony, make-up and gothic ramblings, it isn't really worth the effort."

The PC version and its Collector's Edition sold 42,000 units in the U.S. by October 2001. The Dreamcast version in the U.S. sold 34,453 units.
