= Component Developer Magazine =

CODE
- Editor: Rod Paddock
- Categories: Computer magazines, Computer programming, .NET Framework
- Frequency: Bi monthly
- Founded: 1999
- Company: EPS Software
- Country: United States
- Based in: Spring, Texas
- Language: English
- Website: www.codemag.com
- ISSN: 1547-5166

Component Developer Magazine or CoDe (registered as CODE Magazine) is a computer magazine edited and produced by the publishing and software company EPS Software. CODE is published bi-monthly, and it is available in printed and digital format. The magazine focuses on providing information about Computer programming in using today's development topics including .NET Framework, Visual Studio, Microsoft SQL Server and Microsoft SharePoint.

== History ==
CoDe Magazine was started in 1999, by Rick Strahl and EPS Software’s President Markus Egger. The first three issues of the magazine were written in German, and originally published in Austria (then called Software Developer Magazine). Shortly after the original three issues were published, .NET technologies became a primary focus for the magazine as Microsoft was beginning to phase out Visual FoxPro. In 1999, CoDe Magazine’s parent company, EPS Software, moved its headquarters to Houston, where it is still located.

EPS Software and CODE participate in community developer events and frequently support Code Camps, or code and development camps put on by the community to help promote software development.

== See also ==
- List of computer magazines
