= MicroLeague Baseball: The Manager's Challenge =

1991 video game

- Developer: MicroLeague Sports Association
- Publisher: MicroLeague Sports Association
- Platforms: Amiga, DOS, Macintosh
- Release: 1991
- Genre: Sports

MicroLeague Baseball: The Manager's Challenge is a 1991 video game published by MicroLeague Sports Association.

== Gameplay ==
MicroLeague Baseball: The Manager's Challenge is a game in which the focus is the challenge that team managers face in winning games.

== Reception ==
Win Rogers reviewed the game for Computer Gaming World, and stated that "The Manager's Challenge does not offer as many playing options, animated sequences or statistical categories as some other games, but it provides a straightforward and playable simulation. The basic game is a bargain if one accepts its limitations, and its range of supplementary disks is awesome, although it can take a considerable investment to get all the teams and options that one might want. The Official Field Guide and Disk by itself is an enjoyable introduction to The Manager's Challenge and, more generally, to the pleasures of strategic baseball on the computer."

Peter Olafson for Amiga World said "In terms of stats and manager options, MicroLeague rivals Earl Weaver Baseball and sometimes surpasses it."
