= Rosalind Resnick =

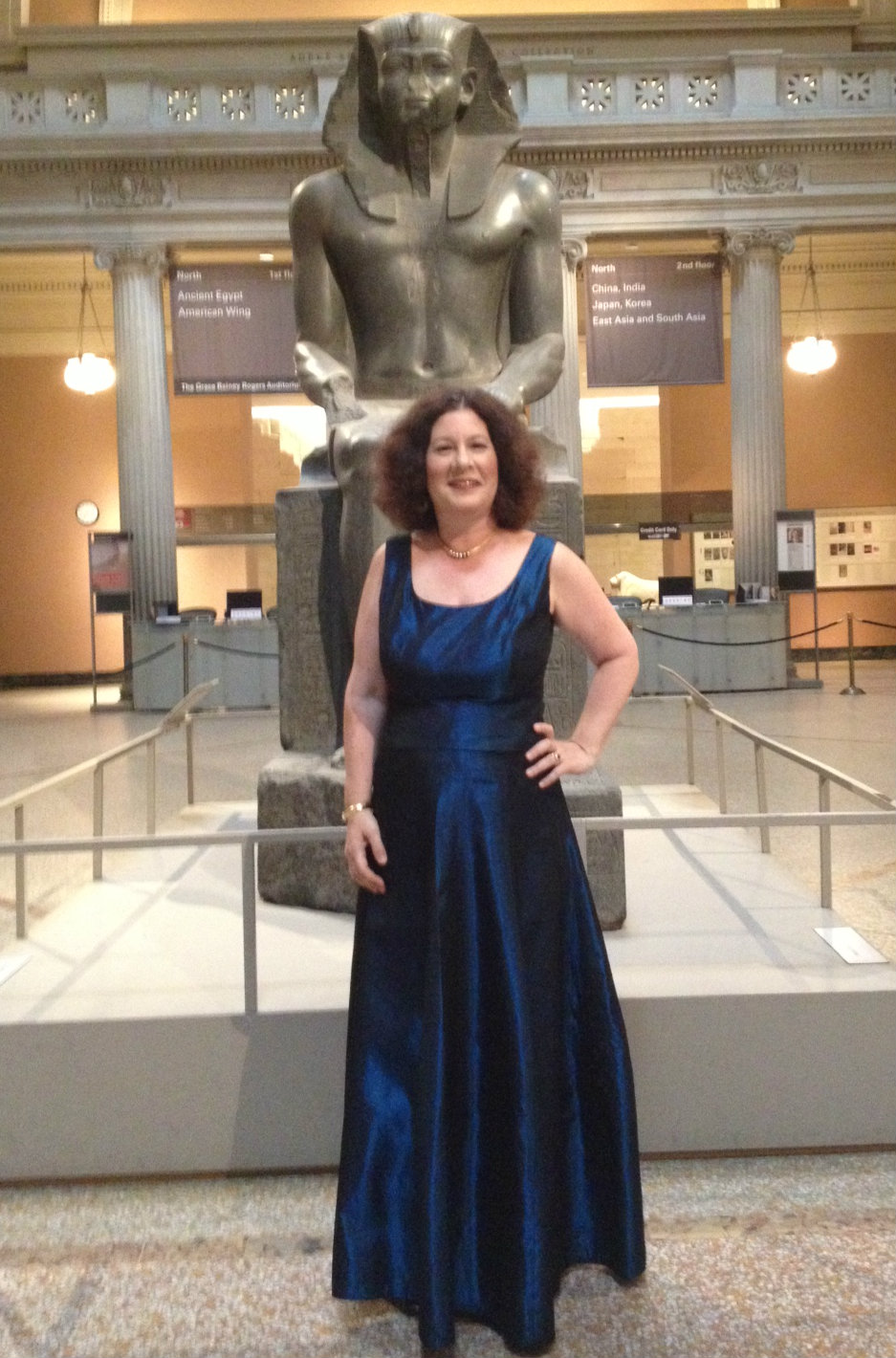
- Born: July 10, 1959; Jamaica, Queens, New York
- Education: Johns Hopkins University
- Occupations: Real estate investor, entrepreneur, inventor, author, filmmaker, poet
- Years active: 1980–present
- Board member of: Do Something, American Red Cross, Girl Scouts of Greater New York

Rosalind Resnick is an American real estate investor, entrepreneur, inventor, author, filmmaker and poet credited with the creation of and awarded the patent for opt-in email, a permission-based form of email marketing. She has served on the advisory board of several companies and nonprofits, including the Girl Scouts of Greater New York, the American Red Cross of New York and Do Something, a not-for-profit whose mission is to motivate children to become active in their communities.

== Biography and education ==
Resnick was born to Dr. Myron Ellis Resnick and Phoebe Rose Rogosin Resnick in Jamaica, Queens in 1959. She graduated Johns Hopkins University in 1981 with a B.A. and M.A. in Florentine Renaissance Social and Economic History. She has two children, Julia Grueskin (b. 1989) and Caroline Grueskin (b. 1992).

== Business career ==
=== Real Estate ===
Resnick publicly expressed her interest in real estate upon retirement from NetCreations in 2001. As of 2023, she owns and manages six townhouses in New York City's West Village.

=== Axxess Business Centers (d/b/a Axxess Business Consulting) ===
In 2002, Resnick founded and served as president of Axxess Business Consulting, a New York City consulting firm that helped startups and emerging businesses develop business plans and financial models to raise capital from angels, banks and investors.

=== NetCreations ===
Resnick co-founded NetCreations in March 1995 and served as the company's CEO and president until December 2001. She co-patented the concept of 100% opt-in email marketing in 1996, which turned the 2-person website design firm into an online marketing company that generated $58 million in sales in 2000, the year after its IPO, and earned it a ranking in Business Week’s "Information Technology 100" in 2001 for revenue growth surpassing 615%.

NetCreations’ development of opt-in email responded to the prevalence of unsolicited email marketing, or Spam, which, in testimony to the Federal Trade Commission in 1997, Resnick characterized as an abuse of privacy. By 2000, NetCreation's opt-in email list was reportedly growing by 30,000 new email addresses per day, garnered from a pool of more than 260 partner websites. NetCreations’ first clients for opt-in generated email marking lists were CMP Publishing, IDG Corp., MacMillan Online, Prodigy, Scholastic and Ziff-Davis Publishing Company. The company's early success in this Spam alternative to email marketing reportedly prompted traditional list houses to develop and sell web-generated lists.

At the time of its IPO, the company was valued at approximately $300 million, achieving a market cap of over $1 billion in February 2000. Resnick and her partner Ryan Scott sold the company after the dot-com crash of 2000 to SEAT Pagine Gialle in February 2001 for $111 million in cash.

=== NetGirl Forum ===
In the role of a cyber-relationship "sexpert," Resnick developed and hosted AOL’s NetGirl Forum, one of the early Internet’s most popular online dating services, from 1995 to 1996.

=== Patents ===
Specifications
Patent No.	Title	Patent Date	Inventors
12,260,689	System and method for an electronic lock with an external power source	March 25, 2025	Rosalind Resnick, Ciro De Martino
6,167,435	Double opt-in.TM. method and system for verifying subscriptions to information distribution services	December 26, 2000	Ryan Scott Druckenmiller, Rosalind Resnick

== Journalism and publications ==
Resnick was a copy editor for The Baltimore Sun in 1980 and 1981, a reporter for Footwear News from 1982 to 1984, and a business and technology reporter for The Miami Herald from 1984 to 1989.

After leaving The Miami Herald in 1990, Resnick wrote freelance business and technology stories for dozens of national and international publications, including The National Law Journal, International Business, Florida Trend, Compute!, PC Today, and Home Office Computing.

From 1994 to 1997, Resnick served as the editor and publisher of Interactive Publishing Alert, a semimonthly newsletter tracking trends and developments in online publishing and advertising. She wrote a business advice column for Entrepreneur Magazine from 2004 to 2011 and has been a guest columnist on business matters for The Wall Street Journal and the American Journalism Review.

=== Books ===
- Exploring the World of Online Services (1993) ISBN 0895887983
- The Internet Business Guide (1995) ISBN 1575210045
- A Pocket Tour of Shopping on the Internet (1995) ISBN 0782118089
- Getting Rich Without Going Broke (2007) ISBN 1589615743
- Beating the Bailout Blues: How to Stay Sane When the Markets Are Driving You Crazy (2009) ISBN 1439212627
- The Vest Pocket Consultant’s Secrets of Small Business Success (2010) ISBN 1449581617
- Drams in a Drawer and Other Poems (2015) ISBN 1519691769
- Girl in my Rearview Mirror (2016) ISBN 1533466246
- Townhouse Confidential (2020) ISBN 9798672450681

== Creative ==
=== Filmed Entertainment ===
Resnick is the writer and executive producer of the feature-length romantic comedy based on her book Townhouse Confidential (dir. Patrick Perez Vidauri). It finished production in 2021. It premiered at The New York Independent Film Festival and was awarded Best Feature Film. In January 2023, the film will be distributed by Vision Films and released theatrically in New York City and on VOD.

In 2018, Resnick co-produced an independent film called My ‘Friend’ Mick directed by Ankush Jindal. She and co-writer Ciro De Martino developed a TV series called The Medici Diamonds, a 2019 official selection for the International Filmmaker Festival of World Cinema's "Best Unproduced Scripts."

=== Poetry ===
Resnick is a published poet and founded The Poetry Table, a self-described "21st Century poetry salon" in 2013, which has hosted hundreds of weekly round-table discussions on poetry and has a membership of 593 poets. The Poetry Table was a sponsor of the 6th Annual New York City Poetry Festival in 2016.

== Memberships and lectures ==
Resnick joined the Board of Trustees of the American Red Cross in 2010 and served on the Board of Directors of Do Something from 2004 to 2009 as well as the Board of the Girl Scouts Council of Greater New York from 2001 to 2003. She has been a featured speaker at Johns Hopkins University, Harvard University, New York University, and Pace University.
