= Pro Football Simulation =

1989 video game

- Developer(s): MicroSearch
- Publisher(s): MicroSearch
- Platform(s): Amiga
- Release: 1989

Pro Football Simulation is a 1989 video game published by MicroSearch.

== Gameplay ==
Pro Football Simulation is a game in which professional American football games are simulated in detail. The teams in the game are fictional.

== Reception ==
George G Campbell reviewed Pro Football Simulator for Games International magazine, and gave it a rating of 9 out of 10, and stated that "I thoroughly recommend Pro Football to anyone keen on playing an accurate football simulation. If you know little about American Football when you buy this game, you'll know plenty within a few weeks."

Computer Gaming World noted the game's numerous features and called it "an extremely sophisticated football simulation".

Rick Teverbaugh for Amiga World praised the "realism and authenticity" of the game, stating that "Professional Football Simulation is great fun to play".

== See also ==
- Pro Football Simulator
