= The Settlers II =

1996 city-building and real-time strategy video game

- MS-DOS cover art
- Developer: Blue Byte Software
- Publishers: Blue Byte Software; Ubisoft (DS)
- Producer: Thomas Hertzler
- Designer: Thomas Häuser
- Programmers: Thomas Häuser; Peter Ohlmann
- Artists: Christoph Werner; Adam Sprys
- Writer: Wolfgang Walk
- Composer: Haiko Ruttmann
- Series: The Settlers
- Platforms: MS-DOS; Mac OS; Nintendo DS; AmigaOS
- Release: MS-DOS: DE: April 17, 1996; UK: August 13, 1996; NA: August 31, 1996; Mac OS: NA: September 24, 1997; Nintendo DS: DE: July 12, 2007; EU: August 3, 2007; NA: August 21, 2007; AmigaOS: October 18, 2025
- Genres: City-building, real-time strategy
- Modes: Single-player, multiplayer

The Settlers II (German: Die Siedler II), originally released as The Settlers II: Veni, Vidi, Vici, is a 1996 city-building game with real-time strategy elements for MS-DOS, Mac OS, and Nintendo DS. Developed and published by Blue Byte Software, the DOS version was released in Germany in April 1996, and in the United Kingdom and North America in August. In December, Blue Byte released an expansion, The Settlers II Mission CD, featuring new single-player campaign missions, new maps for both single-player and multiplayer modes, and a map editor. In October 1997, they released The Settlers II: Gold Edition, containing the original game, plus the Mission CD expansion, along with minor graphical enhancements and gameplay tweaks. The Gold Edition was also ported to Mac OS in September 1997. In 2006, an enhanced remake, The Settlers II (10th Anniversary), was released for Windows. In 2007, the Gold Edition was ported to the Nintendo DS, under the title The Settlers and released in Germany in July, and the United Kingdom and North America in August. Although adapted for the dual-screen display of the DS, and with controls specifically programmed for use with the DS stylus, the gameplay, game mechanics, graphics and storyline are unaltered. In 2009, the original Gold Edition was released on GOG.com, and in 2018, it was re-released for Windows as The Settlers II: Veni, Vidi, Vici - History Edition. In October 2025, an Amiga version of the Gold Edition was released. It is the second game in The Settlers series, following The Settlers (1993).

The game can be played in either single-player campaign mode or in "Free game" mode; individual scenarios with predetermined rules set by the player, which can be played with or against either another player, the computer, or both another player and the computer. In the single-player campaign, the player controls a group of Romans who are shipwrecked on an uncharted island. Led by their captain, Octavius, they must use a series of magical portals to try to find their way back to the Empire. During their travels, they come into conflict with Nubians, Vikings and Japanese. In the single-player campaign included with the Mission CD, the player controls Octavius's great-grandson as he attempts to conquer the entire world.

In making The Settlers II, Blue Byte wanted to improve upon the first Settlers title to as much of an extent and in as many ways as they could. To this end, they sought fan feedback from the first game and hired Thomas Häuser, who had worked on quality assurance for The Settlers, as the lead designer. Although the core supply and demand-based gameplay is broadly the same as in the first game, many other aspects of the gameplay and game mechanics have been altered. For example, the sound effects and graphics have been enhanced, with more on-screen movements and more animations for the settlers themselves, and with four aesthetically distinct races; the economic system is more complex; the battle system is more strategic, with the player able to use scouts and stationary offensive weaponry; and a story-driven single-player campaign has been included.

The original game received positive reviews, with critics especially praising the supply and demand gameplay, the complex economic system and the graphics. The most common criticisms were the lack of direct control during combat, and the absence of an online multiplayer mode. The game was a commercial success, selling over 600,000 units worldwide, considerably more than the original Settlers. The DS remake received negative reviews, with many critics arguing it tarnished the legacy of the original, citing unresponsive controls, a poorly implemented HUD, and, especially, game-breaking bugs.

== Gameplay ==
The Settlers II is a city-building game with real-time strategy elements, in which the primary goal on each map is to build a settlement with a functioning economy, producing sufficient military units so as to conquer rival territories, ultimately gaining control of either the entire map, or a certain predetermined section of it. To achieve this end, the player must engage in economic micromanagement, construct buildings, and generate resources. The game is controlled via a point and click interface, and features a HUD navigated primarily through "windows" modeled on Windows 95.

=== Game modes ===
The game can be played in one of two modes; "Campaign" or "Free Game". In the single-player Campaign mode, the player must complete a series of missions, the goal of each of which is to defeat the computer controlled opponent or opponents by gaining possession of the territory in which the mission objective is located. In the original release of the game, there were ten missions, with the player limited to controlling the Romans. The Mission CD expansion added a new campaign of nine missions, with the player once again confined to controlling the Romans.

In Free Game mode, the player chooses a map on which to play, and then refines the game in various ways, such as selecting the number of races (from two to four), choosing which race to control (Romans, Nubians, Vikings or Japanese), selecting the victory conditions (how much of the map must be controlled), refining the amount of raw materials available to each player at the start of the game, and determining if each race begins in a predetermined spot, or is instead placed randomly on the map. The player can also select the type of game to be played, choosing from "Every man for himself", "Human vs. Computer" and "People vs. People". This allows for a variety of different game types, such as two human-controlled races against one computer-controlled race (and vice versa), two human-controlled races against two computer-controlled races, two human and two computer-controlled races all fighting one another, and two human-controlled races competing against one another. Games involving two human players are played in split screen, with the second player using a mouse on the same PC.

=== Settlers and transportation ===
Whether playing in Campaign or Free Game mode, each game begins the same way; the player has one building, a warehouse/headquarters, in which are a set amount of raw materials and tools. The basic gameplay revolves around serfs (the titular "settlers") who transport materials, tools and produce, and who populate and perform the requisite task of each building. As the player constructs buildings and thus requires settlers to occupy them, the settlers automatically emerge from the warehouse as needed. As the settlement continues to grow in size, the warehouse's quota of settlers will eventually be reached, and the player will need to build an additional warehouse to generate more settlers. At no point does the player directly control any individual settler - instead, general orders are issued (such as ordering the construction of a building), with the AI handling the delegation of orders to specific settlers.

Screenshot of The Settlers II, showing the "Activity window", which allows players to construct buildings. The HUD also shows part of the player's settlement, with the various buildings linked by roads. The roads are demarcated by waypoints (blue flags), which function as hubs for the distribution of goods, with a single settler operating between each flag.

An important game mechanic is the construction of a road network to allow for an efficient transportation system, as any settlers transporting goods must use roads. To build a road, the player must place a flag, select the "build road" option, and then place another flag. The computer will then automatically find the best route between the two and build the road, although the player is also free to build the road manually. To maximize distribution, the player must set as many flags as possible on each road. Flags can only be set a certain distance apart, and serve as transport hubs; a settler will carry an item to a flag and set it down, at which point the next settler along will pick up the item and continue, freeing the first settler to return and pick up another item at the previous flag. The more flags the player has, the more settlers will operate on a given road, cutting down the distance each settler must travel, and reducing the time to transport one item and return for the next, thus avoiding item congestion at each flag. When more than one item is placed at a flag, the game has an adjustable goods priority system, which determines the order in which items are transported. Players can also build shipyards, which allow for the manufacture of boats (can transport goods over small stretches of water), and ships (can transport goods across oceans).

=== Economy ===
The economy is under the player's control throughout the game and is adjustable in multiple ways. For example, the player can control the distribution of goods by selecting how much of a given resource is transported to a given building, under six separate headings; foodstuff, grain, iron, coal, boards and water. Similarly, the player can select what tools are made when; by increasing the significance of a particular tool, that tool will be produced before others. Tool production is important insofar as all buildings require raw materials and a worker with the right tool. For example, if the player has built a bakery, and the building is still empty despite idle settlers in the headquarters, a rolling pin will need to be manufactured in the toolsmith.

=== Military ===
The player's territory can only be expanded by building a military complex near the territory border. Each complex must have at least one soldier garrisoned for the territory to expand. Soldiers are automatically created from the pool of existing settlers in the headquarters, with each soldier requiring a sword, shield, and one unit of beer. Once soldiers are garrisoned, gold coins can be transported to the building to increase their rank. The player can also build lookout towers, which can see for great distances, but don't grant new territory.

The player also has control over the structure of their military, and is free to change the number of settlers who become soldiers, the rank of first-line defence soldiers, how many soldiers from each building can be used offensively, how many soldiers counter the enemy if nearby buildings are attacked, and how many soldiers take up positions in buildings in the settlement's centre, further out, and on the borders.

For the player to attack an enemy building, they must click on that building, and select both the number of units and what rank they wish to use to carry out the attack. If the player's units defeat all soldiers stationed in the building, they will occupy it, with the player's territory increasing according to the building's radius. The player can also use catapults to attack enemy military buildings. Catapults are immobile, and fire stones at enemy buildings within their range, with each successful hit killing one occupying soldier. If all soldiers are killed, the building burns down, and the enemy loses the territory controlled by that building. Defense of the player's military buildings is automatic; as enemies attack, any soldiers stationed in the building defend.

== Plot ==
The game begins in the fourth year of the reign of Emperor Travianus Augustus Caesar, as Octavius, a captain in the Roman navy, is sailing his ship, the Tortius, through the dangerous "Sea of Storms" to the "Latonic Provinces". However, the ship is hit by a sudden storm, thrown off-course, and, after several days, driven onto the coastline of an island, marooning the crew. Octavius quickly deduces the island is unknown to the Empire, and thus, rescue is unlikely. Seeing a plentiful supply of food, the crew decide to settle.

Setting out to explore, they discover a gateway-like structure with a Latin inscription, "Consiste ut procederas" ("Settle down in order to make progress"). Perplexed at the contradictory nature of this message, they continue to build up their settlement. Thirteen months later, a portal opens in the gateway, and Octavius concludes the inscription means that for the gateway to function, they must first construct a vibrant settlement.

Entering the portal, they are transported to another island, and after several months, find evidence of Nubian inhabitants. The Nubians greet the Romans peacefully, telling them about their "holy relic", which Octavius realises is another portal. He asks for access to it, but the Nubians refuse, and Octavius determines to take it by force. After five months of fighting, the Romans defeat the Nubians and enter the portal. Over the next few years, as they use a series of portals to jump from island to island, they come into conflict with more Nubians, as well as Vikings and Japanese, before eventually emerging on what they believe to be the final island on their journey home.

Ten years after being shipwrecked, they locate the final portal, but are shocked to learn it is guarded by hostile Romans. However, they are able to fight their way through, finally returning to the Empire.

== Development ==
Blue Byte had always intended to make a sequel to The Settlers if it proved successful. A commercial success, by June 1996, the original game had sold over 215,000 units, considerably more than expected, and so Blue Byte immediately began development on a second game, with a total of twelve people working on the project. As well as enhancing the graphics and sound effects, and increasing the complexity of the supply and demand-based gameplay, there were also certain aspects of the original with which Blue Byte had been unhappy, and which they hoped to address in the sequel. They also sought feedback from fans of the first game, and worked to deal with anything the fanbase disliked or felt could be improved upon. However, Volker Wertich, who had designed and programmed the original, was not involved with the second game, because, as he describes it, "after two years programming The Settlers, I didn't really want to see those little men for a while".

It was Blue Byte's desire to improve upon any aspects of the first game which they felt didn't work which led to Thomas Häuser becoming project manager. When the first game was in development, Häuser was newly employed by Blue Byte and had done quality assurance work on it. In this capacity, he had made a list of possible gameplay improvements for the developers, who told him there was no time to implement his changes, as the game was almost ready for release. However, they had been impressed with his ideas, and, when the second game was greenlit, they suggested he apply his ideas to this game. This ultimately led to Häuser, a programmer by trade, working as the lead designer on the sequel.

Amongst the graphical enhancements in The Settlers II are more on-screen movements and more animations for the settlers themselves, with four aesthetically distinct races. Gameplay improvements include a more strategic battle system, which allows players to send out scouts, and utilise a stationary offensive weapon in the catapult. Additionally, there is a story-driven single-player campaign, replacing the narratively unconnected missions from the first game, which simply got harder as the player progressed, without any kind of connective plot. Initially, the team took the concept of a single-player storyline too far, designing maps which placed tight limits on what the player could and couldn't do, and featured time-sensitive scripted incidents. They quickly realised that this went too much against the principles of the game mechanics established in the first game, and so changed the level design accordingly. According to Häuser:

In the beginning, we had conceived of the game differently. It was much more story-driven, but we scaled that back. Everyone plays differently - if you begin by building two sawmills instead of a stonemason, the game is already completely different. Therefore, there can't be rigidly fixed paths and, for example, a certain event happening after twenty minutes.

Despite the team's efforts to make The Settlers II as good as they possibly could, speaking in 2006, Häuser comments that, as with the original game, there were elements with which he was unhappy: "Things like the help system. There was none, to be honest. The player had to work really hard to get into the game, and there's lots of details in the game you have to learn the hard way. It would have been a great help to a new gamer if we had some put in". He also agreed with many fans of the game that the shipping system didn't work very well, even after it was patched in the Gold Edition: "It didn't work as we wanted it to work. I remember the ships did not transport the things you wanted to other islands, we couldn't solve this problem at the time. Because at this time, the development systems were much more difficult to use and we didn't have the ability to debug code as we do today. It was just not working as we wanted it to work". When The Settlers III went into development in 1997, Blue Byte again sought feedback from fans, and one of the most requested aspects for the new game was that the shipping system from The Settlers II be reprogrammed.

=== Mac OS version ===
In August 1997, Blue Byte announced that they would be releasing the game for Mac OS later that year. Häuser explained: "We could not and would not ignore any longer the constant requests from Mac users. However, converting such a complex game as The Settlers II over to the Macintosh meant breaking new ground, not only for ourselves, but also for the industry. It was not easy to find programmers capable of not only replicating The Settlers' high quality, but also meeting the reputed demands of Mac users". Alexander B. Christof of Austrian conversion specialists, Similis, stated, "because the Mac has a completely different processor structure, the complex Settlers' animation - with its thousands of animation phases - have had to be totally redesigned. The landscape routines which have been optimised for Intel processors have also had to be reconstructed". However, in April 1998, Blue Byte CEO and producer of The Settlers II, Thomas Hertzler, announced that the company would not be releasing any further titles on Mac, citing poor sales and lack of support from Apple Inc.: "We have recently reviewed the situation and feel that due to the small number of sales for The Settlers II on Macintosh, it would not be beneficial for Blue Byte to continue developing and publishing titles for the Macintosh. As a huge Mac fan, I was disappointed that we didn't receive support from Apple when working on this title".

=== Nintendo DS version ===
Nintendo DS version, with the activity window on the top screen and animated gameplay on the bottom

In July 2006, Ubisoft, which had acquired Blue Byte in February 2001, announced they would be releasing The Settlers II for Nintendo DS, the first time any game in the series had been released for a system other than a home computer. Whilst the press release referred to the game as The Settlers, the description of the port clarified that it was The Settlers II: Gold Edition, with references to "Roman or World Campaigns". Although Ubisoft and Blue Byte were simultaneously working on a remake of The Settlers II for Microsoft Windows, The Settlers II (10th Anniversary), The Settlers for Nintendo DS would rather be a 1:1 re-release of the original Settlers II, with updated controls and a slightly modified interface. For example, the game uses one of the DS's screens for the various menu functions and Activity Windows, and the other displays the main action. Players are able to swap which screen displayed what, whilst the game is completely touch controlled, with the DS stylus substituting for the mouse on both views.

Although the idea of doing a straight re-release of the game initially seemed like a straightforward task, the implementation proved somewhat more complicated, due to the different architectures of a PC and a DS. For example, to get the graphics to look identical to their 1996 incarnation, they had to be completely rewritten for the new device; behind the replication of the original's 2D isometric graphics, a 3D game engine is running, which must convert the graphics in real-time.

In March 2007, German gaming website Gameswelt published an interview with Blue Byte in which they discussed adapting the game to a handheld device. Speaking of the logistics of the port, they stated:

With a PC you have to think less about the size of the code, graphics and sound. [The DS version] had to be much more rigidly optimised, and so completely reprogrammed. All graphics have been revised and the maps had to be optimised as well. In addition, the gameplay was adapted to the DS; in particular, we wanted to utilise the availability of the two DS displays.

Explaining why they had chosen the DS as the platform to which to port the game, they explained:

It has always been our desire to publish The Settlers series on other platforms and expand our fan base. Strategy games are, however, difficult to implement on consoles, mainly because of the controls. On the other hand, the Nintendo DS is suitable for the strategy genre because of the touchscreen controls. As both The Settlers and Nintendo DS appeal to the entire family, we think that with this platform, we have found the perfect target group for The Settlers.

They also pointed out that aside from the use of the stylus and the two screens, the gameplay and graphics were unaltered from the original.

=== Amiga Version ===
In August 2025, the Rheinbreitbach-based company Look Behind You announced that they were developing a "lovingly optimized" port of The Settlers II: Gold Edition for the Amiga, with a release date scheduled for October 18, 2025. This is an officially licensed release from Ubisoft Entertainment. Three versions were announced: a physical box edition (with the game on DVD, manuals in German and English, and collectible postcards) a collector's edition (in a wooden box limited to 250 copies), and a digital download edition.

== Reception ==
Reception

Aggregate scores
| Aggregator | Score | | |
| Aggregator | Amiga | DS | PC |
|---|---|---|---|
| GameRankings | | 38% | 84% |
| Metacritic | | 39/100 | |

Review scores
| Publication | Score | | |
| Publication | Amiga | DS | PC |
|---|---|---|---|
| Computer Gaming World | | | 4/5 |
| Eurogamer | | 1/10 | |
| GameSpot | | 3.5/10 | 7.3/10 (original); 6.6/10 (Gold) |
| IGN | | 4/10 | |
| PC Gamer (UK) | | | 89% |
| PC Games (DE) | | | 91% |
| Pocket Gamer | | 1.5/5 | |
| Arcane | | | 8/10 |
| PC Player | | | 4/5 |
| Amiga Addict | 95% | | |

The Settlers II received positive reviews, with an aggregate score of 84% on GameRankings, based on four reviews. The Nintendo DS re-release received "generally unfavorable" reviews, with a score of 39 out of 100 on Metacritic, based on six reviews, and 38% on GameRankings, based on seven reviews.

PC Games' Petra Maueröder scored the game 91%, giving it a "PC Games Award", naming it Game of the Month, and calling it "world-class". Her main criticisms concerned the notification system, which she felt wasn't entirely reliable when reporting on attacks, the "imposed arbitrariness" of where woodcutters work, and the absence of online multiplayer mode. However, she praised the graphics and gameplay, concluding that "this game will inspire you - regardless of whether you are among The Settlers veterans, or are usually rather sceptical about playing this particular genre".

PC Gamer's James Flynn scored it 89%, and was especially impressed with the balance between city-building and combat. He particularly praised the economic system on which the game is built, calling it "so sound that everything you do makes perfect sense". He also lauded the graphics and variety of animations. His main criticism was that he felt it was not overly different from the first title, writing "Blue Byte have not fundamentally altered the game in the same way that MicroProse did with Civilization II".

PC Player's Jörg Langer scored it 4 out of 5, giving it a "Gold Player" award. Although he was critical of the "indirect control" over combat, and felt that "diplomacy has not been implemented in the slightest", he praised the graphical improvements over the first game, the complexity of the economic system, and the story-driven single-player campaign, concluding "Settlers 2 is just as suitable for the patient casual player as for strategy experts - there is no more constructive, more relaxing strategy game".

Computer Gaming World's Tim Carter scored it 4 out of 5, praising the game's character and the complexity of the economic system, especially lauding the focus on economics over combat; "winning or losing is rooted in economics, and it will be hard to compensate for economic weakness with superior military tactics". He concluded by calling the game "a fun and engrossing experience that challenges your brain without getting on your nerves".

Arcane's Andy Butcher rated it 8 out of 10, writing that "as well as adding new buildings and resources, Settlers 2 also has improved graphics and supports multi-player games. Big fans of the original will find more than enough new stuff to keep them occupied, while the simplicity of the game's controls enable newcomers to easily get to grips with it. Settlers 2 is a great strategy game that's deceptively addictive and absorbing".

GameSpot's Trent Ward scored it 7.3 out of 10, writing that "there really isn't enough to do to make long-term world-building very satisfying". Whilst he praised the graphics and the economic system, especially the complex relationship between the different buildings, he was critical of combat, concluding: "Those who are looking for a more open-ended game may find that Settlers II's low number of construction options and snore-inducing combat keep the game well within the bounds of strategy game mediocrity". Stephen Poole scored the Gold Edition 6.6 out of 10. He too praised the economic system, but, like Ward, he was critical of combat. He also lamented the absence of online multiplayer, concluding that "the game is definitely not for everyone, but for those who think they're up to the challenge of lording over a sprawling empire, the Gold Edition is an excellent deal".

Reviewing the 2025 release, Amiga Addict praised the graphics and sound; rating playability at 100% with a repository of 160 maps. The game was called the "zenith of an era" and until its release was a contender for the "greatest game never to have made it to the Amiga".

=== Sales and awards ===
The game was a commercial success, considerably outselling the first Settlers title. In the German market alone, by November 1996, it had sold 150,000 units. By August 1997, it had sold over 500,000 units worldwide, and roughly 600,000 by May 1998. In August 1998, it was awarded the "Platinum Award" by the Verband der Unterhaltungssoftware Deutschland e.V. (VUD); an award given to titles costing DM55 or more, which sell over 200,000 units nationally within the first twelve months of their release.

The game was nominated for Computer Games Strategy Plus's 1996 "Real-Time Strategy Game of the Year" award, losing to Command & Conquer: Red Alert. In 1997, PC Gamer (UK) ranked it at #27 on their "PC Gamer Top 100" list, calling it "an outstanding cerebral challenge".

=== Nintendo DS ===
IGN's Jack Devries scored the DS version 4 out of 10, calling it "tedious, and [...] not even a functional game". He was critical of the saving and loading times, which he argued were so bad as to discourage players from saving. He also criticised the touchscreen as unresponsive, the "frequent" crashes, and the pace of the gameplay. He concluded, "games like these usually get classified as "only for the hardcore fan", but that's an insult to fans of The Settlers. The biggest fans of the game will be the ones that are most disappointed".

GameSpot's Kevin VanOrd scored it 3.5 out of 10, calling it "a buggy mess." He criticised the touchscreen as unresponsive, and the map and menu scrolling as "sluggish". He was also highly critical of the bugs, citing a mission which couldn't be completed until the sound effects were turned off, and another which crashes when the player zooms in or out: "When it functions, The Settlers can be laid-back fun. But given that you never know how far you're going to get before the next crash, why bother?"

Pocket Gamer's Mark Walbank scored it 1.5 out of 5, citing "unforgivable technical issues". He found the touchscreen unresponsive, the map scrolling "jerky", and the menu icons too small. He also found the number of bugs "staggering", citing the disappearance of icons, intermittent inability to attack enemies, stored resources disappearing, and zooming directly after saving causing the game to crash. Although he praised the core gameplay, he wrote "The Settlers emerges as a real botched job, and one that desecrates the good name of the series".

Eurogamer's Dan Whitehead scored it 1 out of 10, calling it "one of the most clumsy and broken games to [ever] receive a commercial release". He criticised the touchscreen as unresponsive, the overly small icons, and the jerky map and menu scrolling. His biggest criticism concerned the bugs: "Settlers II is a great game. A classic. This version isn't. It's a travesty, and one that should never have been released. Without the fatal bugs, it'd be a disappointing but passable conversion, but you can't play a game not knowing when, or if, the game will actually work the way it's supposed to".

== Expansion ==
The Settlers II Mission CD was released in Germany in December 1996. The expansion features nine new single-player campaign missions in which the player again controls the Romans, this time under the command of Octavius's great-grandchild, as he attempts to conquer the entire world. It also features twelve new maps for Free Game mode, now renamed "Limitless Play", and a map editor.

Released in October 1997, The Settlers II: Gold Edition contains the original game plus the Mission CD. It also features minor graphical enhancements and gameplay tweaks. Additionally, the single-player campaign from the original release has been renamed "Roman Campaign", and the Mission CD single-player campaign has been renamed "World Campaign". In 2009, the Gold Edition was released on GOG.com.

== Legacy ==
The Settlers II has given rise to Widelands. A game written in C++ and built on the SDL libraries, it is an ongoing project begun in 2001. Inspired by and based upon The Settlers and, to a larger extent, The Settlers II, Widelands is itself a new game with its own storyline, races, buildings, graphics and gameplay. In a 2009 review of Build13 for Linux Journal, John Knight wrote: "Widelands is a breath of fresh air in an extremely stale genre, whose roots ironically stem from way back in the past in RTS history. Whether you're chasing a fix of that original Settlers feel or just want a different direction in RTS, this game is well worth a look".

=== Remake and re-release ===
In 2006, an enhanced remake with a new storyline was released for Microsoft Windows under the title The Settlers II (10th Anniversary) (German: Die Siedler II: Die nächste Generation). Thomas Häuser, lead designer of the original Settlers II, chose to remake that particular game as it seemed to be the favourite of fans of the Settlers series. The biggest decision regarding the remake was to renovate the game rather than reinvent it:

The very big issue is that if you talk to people about Settlers 2, a lot of people have a lot of ideas how to improve it. This leads to a very big problem. You can add a lot of features to the game, but it instantly defocuses what the game is all about. For example, if you allow direct control of the military or give more detailed control about what is transported from where or asking an individual woodcutter to chop down a tree because it's in the way because you want to build a farm, it completely changes the game. We decided not to change any of these game mechanics at all. It wasn't easy to tell people that.

In November 2018, Ubisoft re-released the Gold Edition as both a standalone History Edition and as part of The Settlers: History Collection. Optimised for Windows 10, the re-release contains both the original game and Mission CD expansion, and features autosave, 4K monitor support, dual monitor support, options for mouse and keyboard inputs, key mapping for keyboard input, and different device support for split-screen. Available only on Uplay, the History Collection also includes re-releases of The Settlers, The Settlers III, The Settlers IV, The Settlers: Heritage of Kings, The Settlers: Rise of an Empire, and The Settlers 7: Paths to a Kingdom.
