= CodeCamp =

Programming learning institution

Kainos CodeCamp official logo.

Kainos CodeCamp is an initiative established by Kainos on 22 July 2013 which runs in various locations across the United Kingdom. The aim of CodeCamp is to give young people a real-life view of software development, improve their computing skills and inspire them to pursue a career in IT. Practical sessions, named "Breakouts", are run by mentors during the camp to teach attendees about different topics in computing.

At the end of the two-week training and app building period, each attendee's app is reviewed by a judging panel. Selected attendees are required to create a short presentation for the panel on their app and present their solution for judging. Prizes are awarded to the best apps in selected categories.

As well as CodeCamp, CodeShow is held in various locations across the UK to keep students and teaching staff up-to-date on the IT industry and to provide talks and practical sessions on a variety of computing topics.

== See also ==
- Code Camp
