= Computer Decisions =

Monthly computer magazine 1969 to 1986

Computer Decisions was a computer industry monthly magazine published in the 1970s and 1980s.

In 1989 InformationWeek noted the loss to the industry of this and another competitor, Infosystems.

Collectors have described the magazine as being hardware-oriented and management-oriented; one issue ran over 10 pages on "Is there a shortage of computer programmers" in 1980. JSTOR listed them in a bibliography regarding computer ethics.

The magazine's name is included in lists of "published in" such as Columbia University's Graduate Alumni Magazine.

== See also ==
- List of computer magazines
