= First Glimpse =

- Volume 7, issue 8 cover
- Categories: Electronics magazine
- Frequency: Monthly
- Publisher: Sandhills Publishing Company
- First issue: December 2004
- Country: United States
- Based in: Lincoln, Nebraska
- Language: English
- Website: www.firstglimpsemag.com
- ISSN: 1554-2106
- OCLC: 76895497

First Glimpse is a former monthly consumer electronics magazine published by Sandhills Publishing Company in Lincoln, Nebraska, USA.

== History and profile ==
CE Lifestyles was first published in December 2004. It was promoted as being "For the woman with connections." The magazine was renamed as First Glimpse in 2006. The article and editorial content focuses on assisting individuals in incorporating modern technology into their lives. The magazine offers guidance for buying and using cell phones, digital cameras, MP3 players and digital TVs.

== See also ==
- Computer magazines
