= 2019 Lincoln, Nebraska mayoral election =

- May 7, 2019
- Turnout: 36.84%
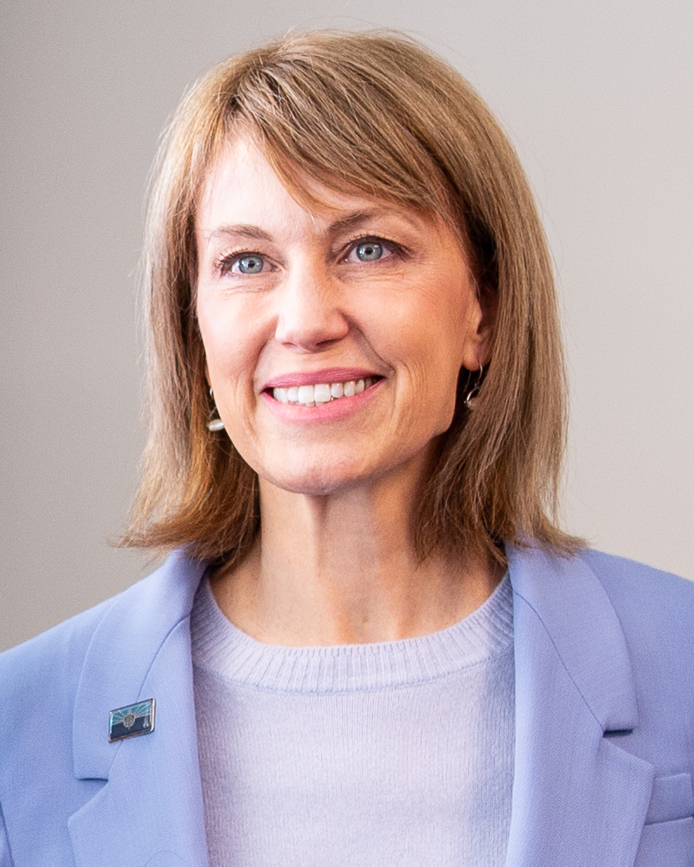

Candidate	Leirion Gaylor Baird	Cyndi Lamm
Popular vote	33,692	27,994
Percentage	54.46%	45.25%
- Results by Precinct; Baird: 40–50% 50–60% 60–70% 70–80% 80–90% Lamm: 50–60% 60–70% Tie; No data
Mayor before election
Chris Beutler
Democratic
Elected mayor
Leirion Gaylor Baird
Democratic

Lincoln, Nebraska held an election for mayor on May 7, 2019, being preceded by an April 9 general primary. It saw the election of Leirion Gaylor Baird.

== Background ==
Incumbent Democratic mayor Chris Beutler was prevented from running by a term-limits amendment to the city charter that was approved by voters on November 6, 2018. In the summer of 2018, several prominent Republican politicians successfully led a petition drive for an amendment to the city charter that would limit the Lincoln mayor to serving three consecutive terms. The amendment would apply retroactively, thereby prohibiting Beutler from running for a fourth term in the 2019 municipal election.

== Primary ==
The primary was held on April 9.

Lincoln mayoral primary results, April 9, 2019
Party	Candidate	Votes	%
Nonpartisan	Leirion Gaylor Baird	21,660	41.87%
Nonpartisan	Cyndi Lamm	18,527	35.81%
Nonpartisan	Jeff Kirkpatrick	8,665	16.75%
Nonpartisan	Krystal Gabel	2,301	4.45%
Nonpartisan	Rene Solc	451	0.87%
Write-in		129	0.25%
Total votes		51,733	32.7%

== General election ==
General election results
Party	Candidate	Votes	%
Nonpartisan	Leirion Gaylor Baird	33,692	54.46%
Nonpartisan	Cyndi Lamm	27,994	45.25%
Write-in		176	0.28%
Turnout		61,862	36.84%
