= Amiga User International =

Monthly computer magazine

- Volume 3, No. 11 cover
- Frequency: Monthly
- Publisher: Croftward Limited (November 1986 - October 1990); Maxwell Specialist Magazines (November 1990 - 1992); Headway, Home & Law (1992 - 1994); AUI Limited (1994 - May 1997)
- Founded: November 1986
- First issue: January 1988
- Final issue Number: May 1997; Volume 11 No. 5
- Country: United Kingdom
- Based in: London, United Kingdom
- Language: English
- ISSN: 0955-1077
- OCLC: 647966530

Amiga User International (or AUI) was a monthly computer magazine published in its later years by AUI Limited, it was the second dedicated Amiga magazine in Europe (beaten by a month by Italy's Enigma Amiga) and in comparison to other Amiga magazines, AUI had a more serious perspective. One of the main features of AUI was the "AUI SuperDisks", which implemented multiple file systems and advanced compression techniques to hold far more data than a standard magazine cover disk.

== History ==
The magazine was first published in November 1986 as an insert to Commodore Computing International. In January 1988 it became an independent magazine. The last issue of Amiga User International appeared in May 1997. A total of 127 issues were published.

Amiga User International was published by different companies during its existence. The magazine was started by Croftward Limited and published by the company until October 1990. Then Maxwell Specialist Magazines published it from November 1990 to 1992. Headway, Home & Law was the publisher between 1992 and 1994. From 1994 to its demise in 1997 the magazine was published by AUI Limited.

== See also ==
- Amiga Survivor
