= Pro Football Simulator =

1988 video game

- Years active: 1988
- Genres: Sports video game

Pro Football Simulator is a 1988 video game published by Sports Simulation Software.

== Gameplay ==
Pro Football Simulator is a game in which a text-based game mode enables players to call every play.

== Reception ==
Wyatt Lee reviewed the game for Computer Gaming World, and stated that "PFS offers a intriguing opportunity for sophisticated pro football fans who want an inexpensive option for face-to-face excitement."

== See also ==
- Pro Football Simulation
