= Orbis Publishing =

British publishing company

- Type: Limited
- Industry: Publishing
- Founded: 1970; 56 years ago
- Defunct: 1999
- Fate: Acquired by Italian De Agostini group
- Successor: De Agostini UK Ltd
- Headquarters: United Kingdom

Orbis Publishing Ltd. was a United Kingdom-based publisher of books and partworks.

== Company history ==
Orbis Publishing Limited was founded in 1970. The company was originally registered on 25 November 1969 under the name Reefdell Limited with the company director and secretary named as Stanley Harold Davis, of 3-5 Leonard Street, City Road, London E.C.2. and the office manager named as David Ordish of the same address. On 1 June 1970 the name of the company was changed to Orbis Publishing Limited and the company secretary was at that date named as S. D. Davis. In 1972 the firm's office was located at 49 Russell Square, London WC1B 4HP.

Orbis employed many writers, researchers, academics, designers, artists and photographers to create the contents for the issues in their various partworks series, including John Gooders, a prolific writer of books on birdlife, who was a consultant editor to Orbis's partwork series The Encyclopaedia of Birds, his work there being so successful as "to merit and entension, requiring Gooders to write a further 12,000 words a week for each of the 26 additional issues".

Partworks publishing was a highly competitive market and for the launch of its partwork series, World of Wildlife in 1971, Orbis Publishing spent "£110,000 for television commercials and another £12,000 for full-page advertisements in the nationals - all crammed into a single message-laden week".

Books published by Orbis Publishing Limited, London often appeared under the imprint of Orbis Books.

Orbis Publishing was merged into De Agostini UK Ltd in 1999 after being acquired by the Italian De Agostini group.

== Partworks ==
- Scandal
- Natural Choice
- One to One
- The Home Computer Course
- The Home Computer Advanced Course
- PC Genius
- NAM (The Vietnam Experience 1965-75)
- Unsolved
- The Illustrated Encyclopedia of Aircraft
- War in Peace
- War Machine
- The Elite: Against All Odds
- The Blues Collection
- The Unexplained
- The British Empire
- Play it Today
- All About Science
- Greenfingers
- KnowHow
- The Movie: The Illustrated History of the Cinema, published December 1979 to January 1983 (in 158 chapters)
- World of Automobiles
- On Four Wheels (in 165 parts)
- On Two Wheels (in 121 parts)
- The Encyclopedia of Super Cars
- The Illustrated Encyclopedia of Wildlife (in 62 parts)
- Warplane (in 120 parts)
- The History of Rock
- World War II
- The Classic Collection
- Wings -The Encyclopedia of Aviation in Weekly Parts (in 166 parts)
- Dinosaurs! (An Orbis Play and Learn Collection)
- Bugs (An Orbis Play and Learn Collection)

== Albums ==
Some magazine partworks were published accompanied with compilation albums.

- The History of Rock (40 volume compilation of vinyl records or audio cassettes) 1981-1987
- The Blues Collection (CD) 1993-1997

== Book series ==
- The Leisure Library
- Orbis Connoisseur's Library
- SSEES Occasional Papers
