= Sandhills Global Event Center =

Event complex in Lincoln, Nebraska

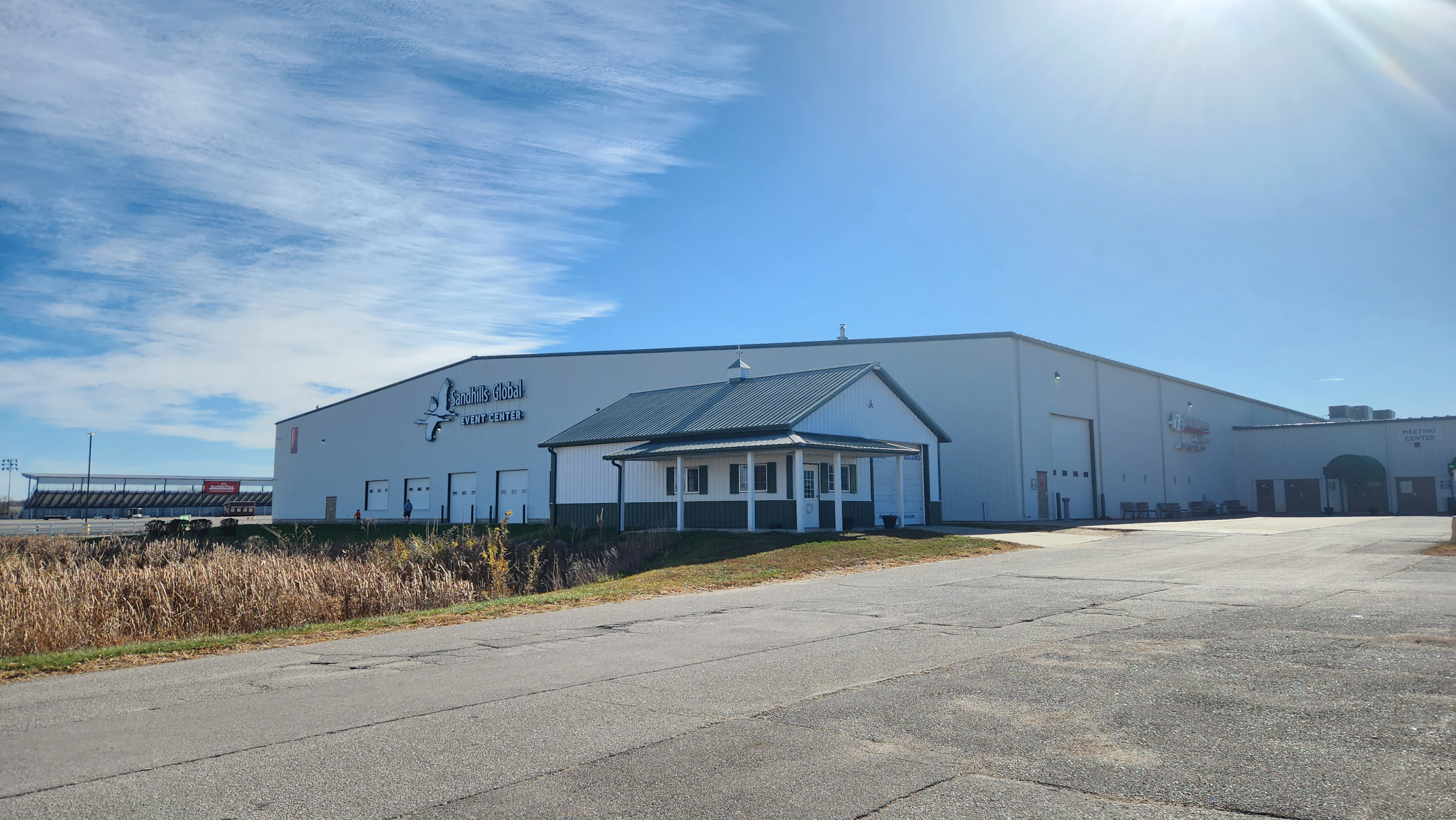
- Sandhills Global Event Center in 2025
- Interactive map of Sandhills Global Event Center
- Former names: Lancaster Event Center
- Address: 4100 N 84th St., Lincoln, Nebraska, U.S.
- Coordinates: 40.85359937293073°N 96.60321972156615°W
- Owner: Lancaster County Agricultural Society

Construction
- Built: 1999–2001
- Opened: 2001

Website
- sandhillsglobaleventcenter.org

The Sandhills Global Event Center, formerly known as the Lancaster Event Center, is a public nonprofit fairgrounds-style event complex located in Lincoln, Nebraska owned and operated by the Lancaster County Agricultural Society. The events center was announced in 1996 and was originally meant to be built further outside of Lincoln. However, former-property owners objected to the land usage, causing its location to be moved. Ground was broken in 1999 and the center officially opened in 2001.

It has hosted farm shows, trade shows, tractor pulls, swap meets, 4-H club meetings, Lincoln City Libraries book sales, and rodeos. All buildings are multi-use, with no fixed seating, for people and animal events by converting dirt arenas to carpeted space each winter when all buildings are used year-round for over 320 events. In 2014, it held over 270 events with approximately 558,765 people attending. Two hundred campsites with electric and multiple asphalt parking lots have been phased in over the years as well.

== History ==
The Lancaster County Agricultural Society, which manages the Lancaster Event Center, was founded in 1867 as the Lancaster County Agricultural & Horticultural Society and re-formed as the Lancaster County Agricultural Society in 1870 as a separate, county-level subdivision under Nebraska law to help promote agriculture.

In 1996, the Lancaster Event Center was announced by the Lancaster County Agricultural Society. The complex was announced due to a need for space that the society lost at the Lancaster County Fairgrounds. The complex would cost an estimated $4 million, would seat an estimated 5,000 people and would be located on 112 and Adams Street outside of Lincoln. However, in 1997, former property owners Evelyn Weese and Frances Lageschulte came out against the decision for the event center to be built on their land. The property was sold to the Nebraska State Historical Society Foundation in 1984 for the future usage of a historical agricultural museum. However, the use for an event center went against their wishes for the land. Weese and Lageschulte then filed a lawsuit against the foundation later that year, and plans to build on the site were cancelled in December.

Development issues caused prices to soar above $8 million and delayed construction past 1998. The site was relocated near 84th Street and Havelock Avenue and ground was officially broken in September 1999. Construction was completed and the Lancaster Event Center officially opened in 2001. The center opened with three buildings with air conditioning, containing a total of 250,000 square feet (23,000 m^{2}). The total cost increased again to $12 million. Upon its opening, the event center received extensive criticism, not only for its high price of $12 million, but its cost tripling from the previous estimate of only $4 million.

In 2007, the Lancaster Events Center was one of the proposed sites to move the Nebraska State Fair. However, plans were largely opposed, and the State Fair would later move to Grand Island. 2007, an $8 million bond issue was approved for the construction of the Amy Countryman Arena, a new pavilion, and additional parking lots. Construction began in early 2008 and was completed in 2009.

In December 2023, the Lancaster Event Center was renamed the Sandhills Global Event Center, as the result of a $7.125 million sale of naming rights to Sandhills Global for 15 years.

== Design ==
Sandhills Global Event Center is located between 84th Street and Havelock Avenue, Lincoln, Nebraska. The center includes five buildings, one being the Amy Countryman Arena. All buildings on site contain a combined total of 387,203 square feet (35,972.3 m^{2}).

== Lancaster County Fair ==
The Lancaster Event Center fairgrounds opened on February 1, 2001, and is the home of the Lancaster County Fair which became known as the Lancaster County Super Fair when extended to 10 days in 2010 upon the departure of the State Fair to Grand Island. It celebrated its 150th anniversary in 2020.
