= Poetry Society of New York =

The Poetry Society of New York, Inc.
- Abbreviation: PSNY
- Founders: Stephanie Berger, Nicholas Adamski
- Founded at: Brooklyn, New York City, New York
- Tax ID no.: 47-3108566
- Legal status: Active 501(c)(3) organization
- Purpose: Poetry, Education, Performance
- Region served: United States, Europe
- Members: 111 (2017)
- Affiliations: Active: The Poetry Brothel, The New York City Poetry Festival, The Typewriter Project Dormant: The Translation Project, The Ear Inn Series, Brothel Books, Quartier Rouge Review
- Website: https://poetrysocietyny.org
- Formerly called: The Poetry Brothel (not incorporated)

The Poetry Society of New York is an American nonprofit organized in the state of New York in 2015. Stephanie Berger and Nicholas Adamski are founding partners. Its mission is finding new and innovative ways to bring together the poetry community with the general public through a series of events and projects. Events are collaborative, interactive and sometimes held in large-scale public venues in contrast to traditional poetry reading formats. Based in New York City, its events are held locally, nationally, in South America and in Europe. The society has published four collections of poetry.

== History and funding ==
The society began under the name The Poetry Brothel in 2008. It was not incorporated until 2010 using instead the name The Poetry Society of New York, LLC. In 2015, The Poetry Society of New York, LLC was dissolved and The Poetry Society of New York, Inc. was incorporated. The Poetry Society of New York was granted 501(c)(3) nonprofit status in 2015 in New York State. The Poetry Brothel is now a program produced by the society. Fundraising currently includes event ticket sales, memberships and financial sponsorships.

== Events ==
The society has three current and four retired projects and events:

Name	Status	Description
New York City Poetry Festival	Current	An annual event held on Governors Island in New York City
The Poetry Brothel	Current	Interactive poetry readings set in the environment of a classic brothel
The Typewriter Project	Current	A series of interactive public art installations that invites the public to write poetry
Brothel Books	Retired	Editing and publishing poetry collections
The Ear Inn Series	Retired	Revival of a poetry event held in an historic New York City bar
Quartier Rouge Review	Retired	An online video literary magazine
Translation Project	Retired	Poetry translation and publishing

== Current projects ==
=== The New York City Poetry Festival ===
The festival was first organized in 2010 and is funded in part by an annual Kickstarter campaign as well as sponsors that, in 2016, included the Brooklyn Brewery, The New School, New York State Council on the Arts, The Poetry Table and the Vermont College of Fine Arts. The two-day poetry festival is held annually on Governors Island and features more than 200 poets. According to The New York Times, the 2015 event was expected to attract 4,000 attendees. Attendees for the 2016 festival attracted residents of West Virginia, Florida, New Jersey and "a poetry journal staffed by students from around the world." LiteraryManhattan.org stated in 2016 that the festival is "one of the largest poetry festivals in the country" and "features an open mic area, where attendees can explore their poetic voices; a Vendor's Village, where artists, artisans, booksellers and food-makers can sell their products; and poetry-generating, interactive art installations throughout." The winner of the 6th Annual Clint Eastwood Award for American Poetry was announced at the 2016 after-party held at Fraunces Tavern Restaurant.

=== The Poetry Brothel ===
The brothel experience is described in various sources as an interactive descent into a Victorian brothel or Prohibition-era Speakeasy populated with "whores" that are portrayed by male and female actors, artists and poets. Brothel events are a blend of burlesque, Vaudeville and poetic performances, the sum of which has been referred to as a "think tank for art." CultureTrip rated the brothel as one of ten suggested "Places To Experience Poetry Readings in NYC." The Poetry Brothel has been staged in and/or maintains sister organizations in:

Continent	Cities/States
North America	Cambridge, Chicago, Edmonton, Kingston, Los Angeles, New Orleans, New York City, Philadelphia, Portland, San Francisco, Vermont
Europe	Amsterdam, Antwerp, Barcelona, Brussels, Dublin, Leicester, London, Paris, Reykjavík
South America	Bogotá, Caracas, Valparaíso

Past readers and performers include: Ariana Reines (2008), David Lehman (2008), Dorianne Laux (2009), Dorothea Lasky (2012), Karen Abbott (2015), Mark Doty (2013), Matthea Harvey (2015), Patricia Smith (2008), Paul Muldoon (2013), Robert Pinsky (2016), and Timothy Donnelly (2013).

The 2011 film "Cabaret Desire" by Erika Lust was based on The Poetry Brothel's events.

=== The Typewriter Project ===
The Typewriter Project is an interactive installation where a Smith Corona Sterling typewriter housed in a wooden hut is loaded with a 100-foot roll of paper and a custom USB port that records typed words and provides Internet access to the content. This technology provides further interactive participation with the text online. A solar generator powers it. The installation is set up for limited periods in various parks and venues in New York City including McCarren Park, Governors Island, Tompkins Square Park and the Pen & Brush Gallery. Writer-contributors at the interactive typewriter installations include passersby as well as amateur writers and professional poets.

== Retired projects ==
=== Brothel Books Publications ===
The society published three books of collected poetry under the imprint "The Poetry Society of New York, LLC & Brothel Books" during its active period between 2010 and 2012. A fourth book was published in handmade form.

=== The Ear Inn Series ===
In 2013, the society resurrected the Ear Inn Series, founded by Ted Greenwald and Charles Bernstein. The series was dormant after a 20-year run that began in 1978. The series was hosted at the James Brown House in TriBeCa, which in turn houses The Ear Inn restaurant and bar. During the society's revival of the series, the tradition of focusing on language poetry continued. The society's revival of the series was active between 2013 and 2014.

=== Quartier Rouge Revue ===
The Quartier Rouge Revue was a quarterly literary video journal started in 2011. It suspended operation in 2012.

=== The Translation Project ===
The project began in 2010 and published one book, "The Translation Project: The Poetry Brothel Poets, Spain and The United States, Volume I.” The project’s goal was to translate new poetry into several languages and publish them monthly. It has been on hiatus since 2012.

== Controversy ==
Prior to the society’s first Poetry Brothel event, an organization in Brighton, England held an event by the same name. The controversy is referenced in a reader’s comment posted in an article by The Guardian dated October 24, 2014 titled "Poetry Brothel puts the bawd in bard" and The Review Review references another rival in Chicago, Illinois, which was started by The Poetry Society of New York but later went independent. There are no public records indicating legal action between any of the aforementioned entities.

== Books ==
- "Andalucia" by Lisa Marie Basile ISBN 0983421714
- "Inside Me a Whale is Taking Shape" by Nicholas Adamski (limited edition, hand-letter-pressed and hand-bound)
- "My Own Fires" by Lauren Hunter aka Harriett Van Os ISBN 0983421722
- "The Translation Project: The Poetry Brothel Poets, Spain and The United States” edited by Berger, Adamski, Kiely Sweatt and Lisa Marie Basile ISBN 0983421706
