= Mark Doty =

American poet and memoirist (born 1953)

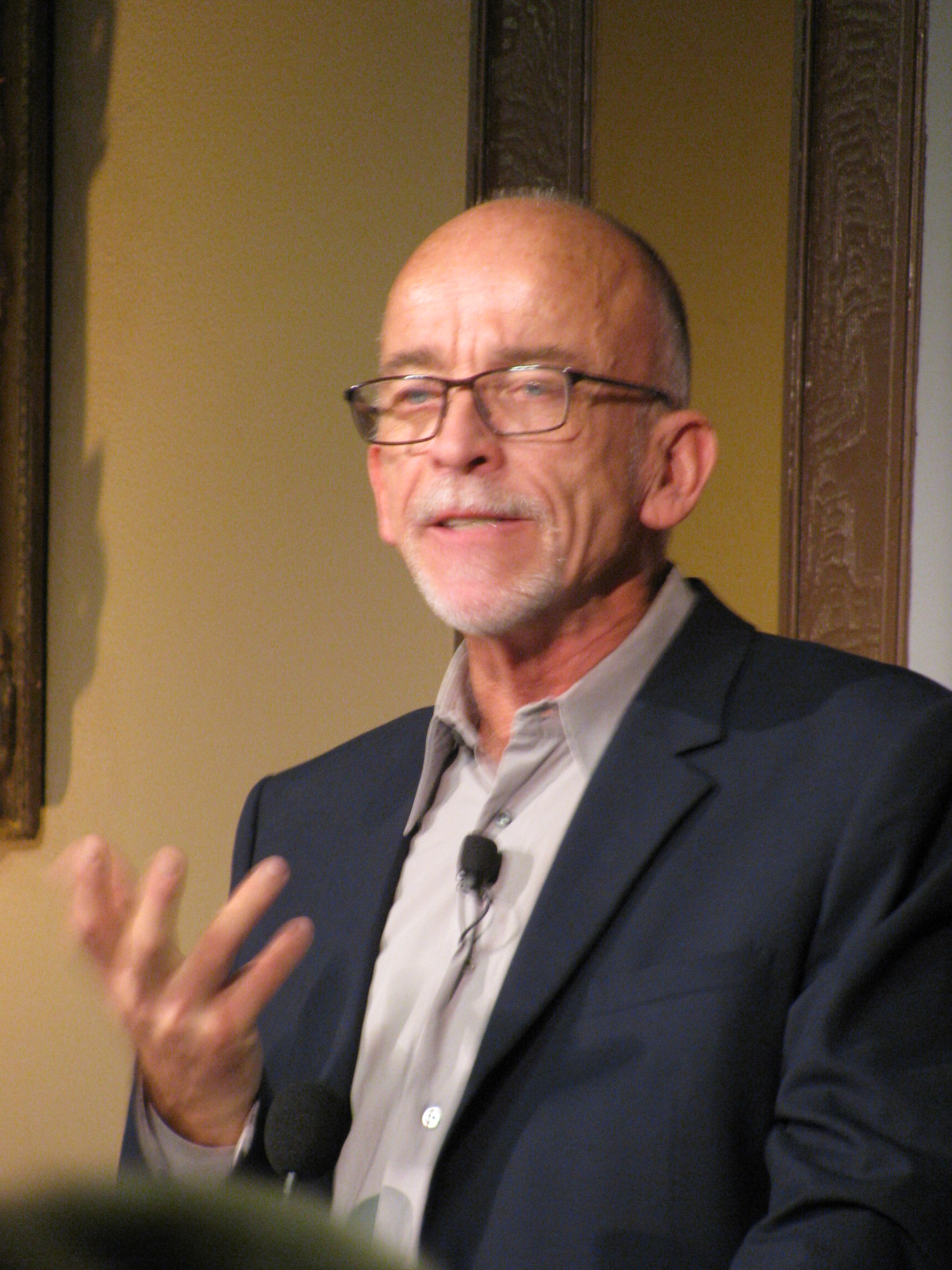
- Born: August 10, 1953 (age 73); Maryville, Tennessee, U.S.
- Education: Drake University; Goddard College
- Spouses: Paul Lisicky (m. 2008; div. 2013) Alexander Hadel (m. 2015)
- Writing career
- Genre: Poetry
- Notable awards: National Book Award for Poetry

Mark Doty (born August 10, 1953) is an American poet and memoirist best known for his work My Alexandria. He was the winner of the National Book Award for Poetry in 2008.

== Early life ==
Mark Doty was born in Maryville, Tennessee, to Lawrence and Ruth Doty, with an older sister, Sarah Alice Doty. He earned a Bachelor of Arts from Drake University in Des Moines, Iowa, and received his Master of Fine Arts in creative writing from Goddard College in Plainfield, Vermont.

== Career ==
Doty's first collection of poems, Turtle, Swan, was published by David R. Godine in 1987; a second collection, Bethlehem in Broad Daylight, appeared from the same publisher in 1991. Booklist described his verse as "quiet, intimate" and praised its original style in turning powerful young urban experience into "an example of how we live, how we suffer and transcend suffering".

Doty's "Tiara" was printed in 1990 in an anthology called Poets for Life: Seventy-Six Poets Respond to AIDS. This poem critiques the way society perceived and treated homosexual AIDS sufferers. The 1980s marked the beginning of the AIDS epidemic in the United States. The Reagan administration's delayed action to fight AIDS resulted in thousands of deaths, especially among young gay men. Much of the initial reluctance to mobilize was due to homophobia—society was, at the time, uncomfortable with gay sexuality. This poem criticizes the idea that gay men "invite[d] their own oppression as a consequence of pleasure." The poem's phrase "he asked for it" represents this common, unsympathetic opinion about gay men with AIDS. Imagery like "perfect stasis" and "body's paradise" is used by Doty to paint a future beyond brutality and discrimination for AIDS sufferers. According to Landau, Doty's poems were "humane and comforting narratives" that offered hope to people living with HIV and stood in contrast to the hostile climate of the United States.

His third book of poetry, My Alexandria (University of Illinois Press, 1993), reflects the grief, perceptions and new awareness gained in the face of great and painful loss. In 1989, Doty's partner Wally Roberts tested positive for HIV. The collection, written while Roberts had not yet become ill, contemplates the prospect of mortality, desperately attempting to find some way of making the prospect of loss even momentarily bearable. My Alexandria was chosen for the National Poetry Series by Philip Levine, and won the National Book Critics Circle Award and the Los Angeles Times Book Prize. When the book was published in the U.K. by Jonathan Cape, Doty became the first American poet to win the T. S. Eliot Prize, Britain's most significant annual award for poetry.

Doty had begun the poems collected in Atlantis (HarperCollins, 1995) when Roberts died in 1994. The book won the Bingham Poetry Prize and the Ambassador Book Award. Heaven's Coast: A Memoir (HarperCollins, 1996), is a meditative account of losing a loved one, and a study in grief. The book received the PEN Martha Albrand Award First Nonfiction.

Doty is the author of nine books of poetry, most recently Deep Lane (W.W. Norton, 2015), a book of descents: into the earth beneath the garden, into the dark substrata of a life. He has also written essays on still life painting, objects and intimacy, and a handbook for writers. His volumes of poetry include Sweet Machine (HarperCollins, 1998), Source, (HarperCollins, 2002), School of the Arts (HarperCollins, 2005) and Fire to Fire: New and Selected Poems (HarperCollins, 2008), which received the National Book Award.

Doty's 3 memoirs include Heaven's Coast, described as "searing" by The New York Times, is the excruciating journaling of his thoughts subsequent to hearing his lover's diagnosis with AIDS, a work "layered" with awarenesses like Dante's trip through hell (HarperCollins, 1996), and Firebird: A Memoir, an autobiography from six to sixteen, which tells the story of his childhood in the American South and in Arizona (HarperCollins, 1999). These first two memoirs received the American Library Associations Israel Fishman Non-Fiction Award. His most recent memoir, Dog Years (HarperCollins, 2005), was a New York Times Bestseller and received the Barbara Gittings Literature Award from the American Library Association in 2008.

Doty's essays include Still Life with Oysters and Lemon (Beacon Press, 2001), a book-length essay about 17th-century Dutch painting and our relationships to objects, and The Art of Description (Graywolf Books, 2010), a collection of four essays in which "Doty considers the task of saying what you see, and the challenges of rendering experience through language."

He served as guest editor for The Best American Poetry 2012 (Scribners, 2012).

Doty has taught at the University of Iowa, Princeton University, Sarah Lawrence College, Columbia University, Cornell and NYU. He was the John and Rebecca Moores Professor in the graduate program at The University of Houston Creative Writing Program for ten years, and is currently Distinguished Professor and Writer-in-Residence in the Department of English at Rutgers University in New Brunswick, New Jersey, where he directs Writers House. He has also participated in The Juniper Summer Writing Institute at the University of Massachusetts Amherst's MFA Program for Poets & Writers, and was on the faculty of the Bread Loaf Writers' Conference in August 2006. He is the inaugural judge of the White Crane/James White Poetry Prize for Excellence in Gay Men's Poetry.

Doty was a judge for the 2013 Griffin Poetry Prize. In 2014, he was welcomed as a trustee of the Griffin Trust For Excellence In Poetry.

In 2011, Doty was elected a Chancellor of the Academy of American Poets.

== Personal life ==
From 1995 until 2010, his partner was the writer Paul Lisicky. They were married in 2008 and divorced in 2013. Doty currently lives with his husband Alexander Hadel in New York City and in the hamlet of The Springs in East Hampton, New York. The couple married in October 2015 in Muir Woods National Monument.

== Awards ==
- 1992: National Poetry Series Winner for My Alexandria
- 1993: National Book Critics Circle Award in Poetry for My Alexandria
- 1993: Los Angeles Times Book Prize for Poetry for My Alexandria
- 1994: Guggenheim Fellowship for Humanities
- 1994: Whiting Award
- 1995: T. S. Eliot Prize for My Alexandria
- 1995, 2001, 2008: Lambda Literary Award for Gay Men's Poetry for Atlantis, Source, Fire to Fire
- 1996: Ambassador Book Award for Poetry for Atlantis
- 1996: Bingham Poetry Prize for Atlantis
- 1997: Pen/Martha Albrand Award for First Nonfiction for Heaven's Coast
- 1999: Lila Wallace Reader's Digest Writers Award
- 2007 Lambda Literary Award for Gay Memoir/Biography for Dog Years
- 2008: Stonewall Book Award for Dog Years
- 2008: National Book Award for Poetry
- 2018: Robert Creeley Award

== Bibliography ==
=== Poetry ===
Collections

- Turtle, swan. David R. Godine. 1987.
- Bethlehem in Broad Daylight. David R. Godine. 1991.. Reprinted with Turtle, Swan by University of Illinois Press, 2000.
- My Alexandria: Poems. University of Illinois Press. 1993. ISBN 978-0-252-06317-6.
- Atlantis. HarperCollins. 1995.
- Sweet Machine. Harper Flamingo. 1998.
- Murano: Poem. Getty Publications. 2000. ISBN 978-0-89236-598-2.. Reprinted from Sweet Machine.
- Source. HarperCollins. 2001. ISBN 9780060935405.
- School of the Arts. HarperCollins. 2005.
- Fire to Fire: New and Selected Poems. HarperCollins. 2008. ISBN 9780060752477.
- Theories and Apparitions. Jonathan Cape. 2008.
- Paragon Park. David R. Godine. 2012. ISBN 978-1-56792-442-8.. Reprint of Turtle, Swan, and Bethlehem in Broad Daylight, with a selection of early poems.
- A Swarm, A Flock, A Host. Prestel. 2013.. With Darren Waterston.
- Deep Lane: Poems. W. W. Norton & Company. 2015. ISBN 978-0-393-07023-1.

List of poems

Title	Year	First published	Reprinted/collected
"Deep Lane"	2015	"Deep Lane". The New Yorker. Vol. 91, no. 7. April 6, 2015. pp. 60–61.	

=== Memoir ===
- Heaven's Coast. HarperCollins. 1996. ISBN 9780060172107.
- Firebird: A Memoir. HarperCollins. 1999. ISBN 9780060193744.
- Dog Years. HarperCollins. 2007. ISBN 9780061171000.
- What is the Grass: Walt Whitman in My Life. W. W. Norton & Company. 2020.

=== Edited ===
- 2003: Open House: Writers Redefine Home, St. Paul: Graywolf Books

=== Essays ===
- Still Life with Oysters and Lemon. Beacon Press. 2001. ISBN 978-0-8070-6609-6.
- The Art of Description. Graywolf Books. 2010.
- "The Unwriteable". Granta (110: Sex). Spring 2010. (Subscription Required)
- "Insatiable". Granta (117: Horror). Autumn 2011. (Subscription Required)

== Performances and recorded media ==
=== Live performance ===
- 2014: The Poetry Brothel, November 10, 2014.

=== Audiotapes ===
- 1996: My Alexandria, University of Illinois Press

=== Videotapes ===
- 1998: Poetry Heaven, a three-part video series, The Dodge Foundation, New Jersey
- 1999: Mark Doty: Readings & Conversations, Lannan Literary Videos, Lannan Foundation, Los Angeles
- 1999: "Fooling with Words", Bill Moyers PBS special, September

== See also ==
- LGBT culture in New York City
- List of LGBT people from New York City
- NYC Pride March
- Poetry analysis
