= Widelands =

Open-source real-time strategy video game

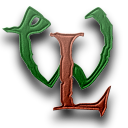
- Developer: The Widelands Development Team
- Stable release: 1.3.1 / 22 February 2026; 7 months ago
- Written in: SDL-based custom engine
- Engine: Simple DirectMedia Layer
- Platform: AmigaOS 4, Linux, BSD, Mac OS X, Microsoft Windows
- Type: Single-player, multiplayer, real-time strategy
- License: GPL-2.0-or-later
- Website: www.widelands.org
- Repository: github.com/widelands/widelands

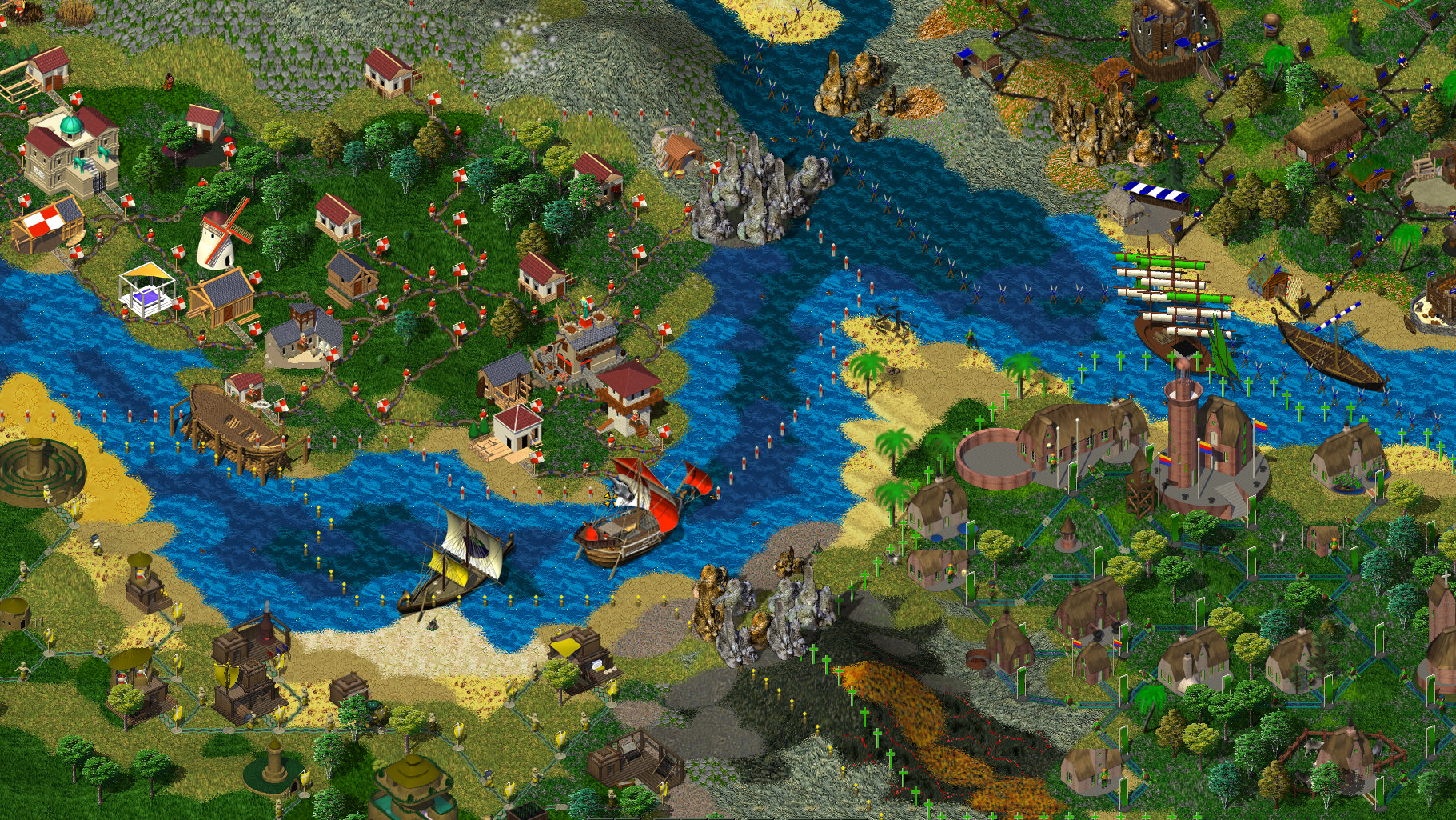
Four tribes in Widelands Build 20

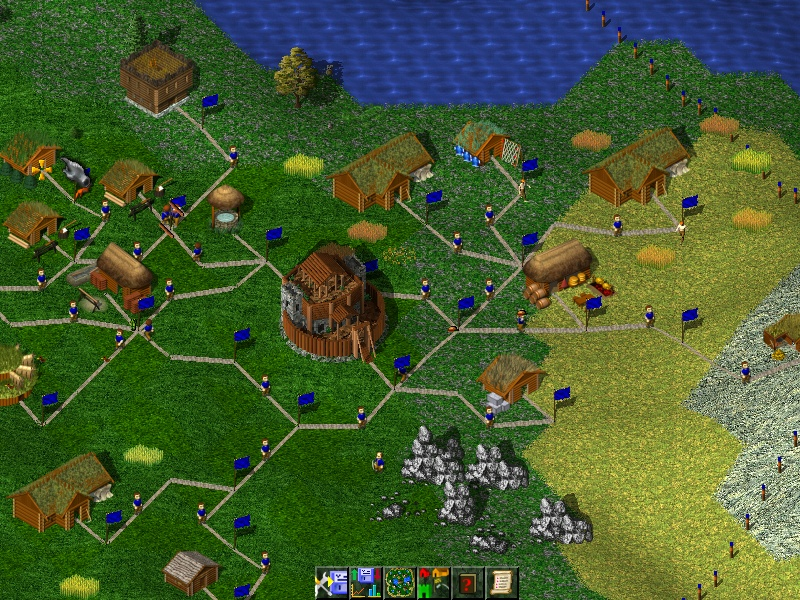
Screenshot of a game taken in 2008

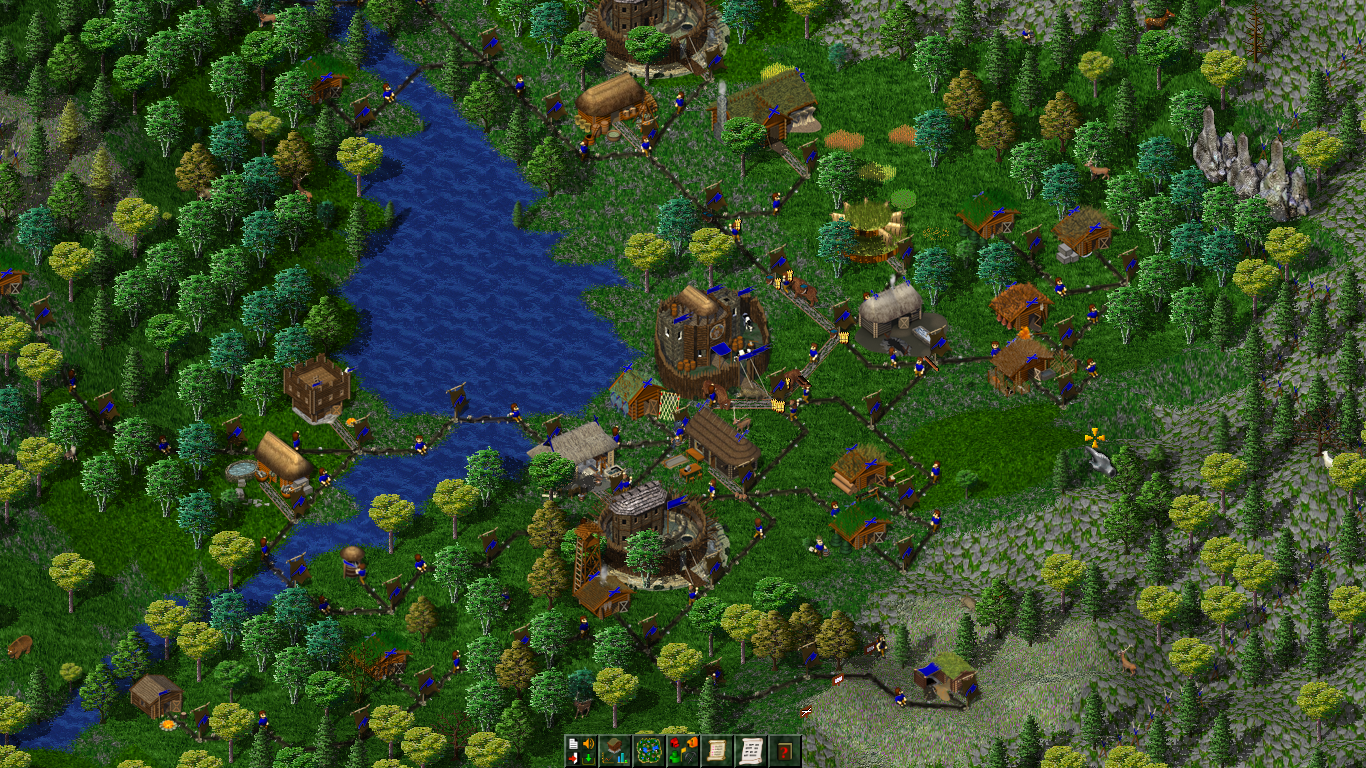
Screenshot of the "Dolomites" map in Widelands Build 19

Widelands is a free and open-source, slow-paced real-time strategy video game under the GNU General Public License. Widelands takes many ideas from and is quite similar to The Settlers and The Settlers II. It remains a work-in-progress game, with development still required in graphics and bug-fixing. The game runs on several operating systems such as AmigaOS 4, Linux, BSD, Mac OS X, and Windows.

== Gameplay ==
Widelands has single-player, local network and internet multiplayer modes, single-player campaign missions, and an internationalisation system with translations for British English, Bulgarian, Catalan, Czech, Danish, Dutch, Finnish, French, German, Hungarian, Italian, Japanese, Korean, Low German, Polish, Portuguese, Russian, Scottish Gaelic, Slovak, Spanish, and Swedish. Players may select one of five different tribes: the human-like "Empire", the "Barbarians", the "Atlanteans", the "Frisians", and the "Amazons".

The game provides four basic tutorials and four tutorial campaigns. Advanced players can create their own maps with the included map editor. It is also possible to import and play original Settlers II maps.

== Development ==
The first version of Widelands was published in August 2002. Widelands 1.0, the first stable version, was released 19 years later in June 2021. The latest release of Widelands as of February 2026 is version 1.3.1.

== Reception ==
The game was reviewed by Linux Journal which noted:

Delve into this game, and there's much that lies beneath the surface. It has simple things that please, like how the in-game menus are very sophisticated and solid, with none of the bugginess you get in many amateur games. But, it's the complete reversal of hyperspeed in its gameplay that I really love. I always want to get back to building my base when playing most RTS games, but I'm constantly drawn away by fire fights. This game lets you keep building, and places serious emphasis on how you do it.

The German LinuxUser magazine reviewed Widelands in issue 4/2008 in a three A4-paged article.

The German c’t magazin wrote a short review of Widelands in their 4/2008 issue and included a Windows version of Widelands Build 11 on their magazin DVD.

The French free software website Framasoft remarked:

This 2d game with a top-down view is a classic RTS remake, with simple graphics, although functional and efficient. We quickly found the happiness of the old Settlers series with the management of different sized sites, the positioning of the roads which bring resources and advancing your zone of influence with different military buildings.

Widelands was selected in September 2010 as "HotPick" by Linux Format magazine.

In 2022 the Slovenian magazine Jazbina briefly reviewed Widelands in a Settlers retrospective, describing it as "another unfinished free alternative, but one that is friendly, ambitious and maverick".

== See also ==
- List of open-source games
