= Channel World =

Magazine

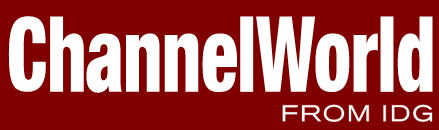

- Categories: Computer magazine
- Final issue: October 2015 (print)
- Company: IDG
- Country: India
- Language: English
- Website: channelworld.in

Channel World is owned and published by IDG and covers the sales channel. The magazine is published monthly. It is published in local versions in Belgium, Czech Republic, India (since 2007) and Netherlands (made from a merger of Channel Partner and Retail Partner in 2007).
