= IT-Branchen =

IT-Branchen is a discontinued IT sales magazine and website published by IDC. It was first published on 17 May 1999 with a monthly circulation of 9,000 includes traditional distributors, dealers, marketing managers, product sales personnel, and Internet e-commerce developers and strategists. The magazine folded in 2002 when it was acquired by n-com, which also published Computer Reseller News.
