= PC Ace =

- Frequency: Weekly
- Publisher: Eaglemoss Publications
- Founded: 1999
- Final issue: 2001
- Country: United Kingdom
- Language: English
- OCLC: 226100634

PC Ace was a partwork magazine published by Eaglemoss Publications, between 1999 and 2001. It was aimed at those aged between 10 and 14, providing information on how to operate a personal computer. Readers of the magazine were assisted in part by a cartoon mouse named Ace, who featured throughout the magazine's pages.

The series consisted of 100 parts, and was previously available for sale in the United Kingdom, South Africa, Australia, and New Zealand, among others.

== Structure ==
PC Ace was released on a weekly basis, with a CD-ROM accompanying the magazine every second issue (with the exception of part 1, which included two CD-ROM discs). These CD-ROM discs contained programs such as computer games and edutainment titles.

Issues that included a CD-ROM did not include the Wordpower section.

== Sections ==
PC Ace was divided into 9 sections, detailed below.

- PC Power - Essential Skills - This section consisted of information on using core computer functions, such as using fonts and operating the Microsoft Windows operating system. It was discontinued after part 12.
- PC Power - Operating Skills - This section consisted of information that discussed use of the Microsoft Windows operating system in a more in-depth manner, such as running games under MS-DOS and changing shortcut icons.
- PC Power - Program Skills - This section focused on the use of software that ran within the Microsoft Windows operating system, such as Microsoft Word and Microsoft Excel.
- Technozone - This section contained a collection of technology related articles that was built up as the series progressed. Topics included Gamepads and Animation.
- Online - This section consisted of information about how to use the internet and tools that were available online. Topics included creating a website and sending email.
- On CD-ROM - This section was only included with issues that were accompanied by a CD-ROM. It had information on the background of the included program, as well as brief details of how to use it.
- Wordpower - This section was an A - Z index of computing terms which built up as the series progressed, in alphabetical order, with their definitions included.
- Timeout - This section provided details on how to create items such as party invitations and graphics, as well as how to play games that are included in the Microsoft Windows operating system.
- Cyberchat - This section contained technology related news items, as well as letters sent in by readers of the magazine (under the title of 'Ace's Noticeboard').
