= 2023 Lincoln, Nebraska mayoral election =

- May 2, 2023
- Turnout: 46.22%
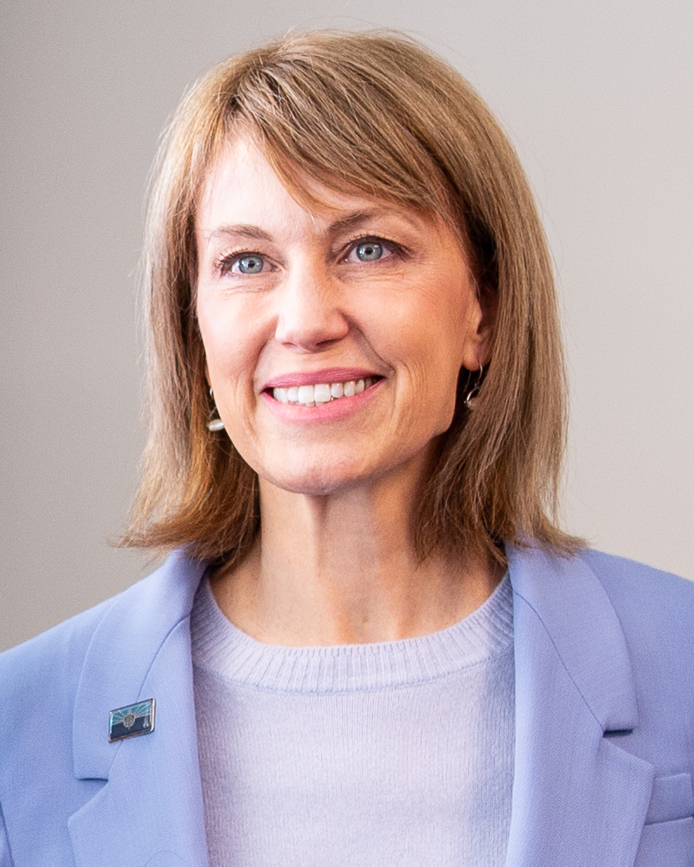

Candidate	Leirion Gaylor Baird	Suzanne Geist
Popular vote	43,984	36,417
Percentage	54.58%	45.19%
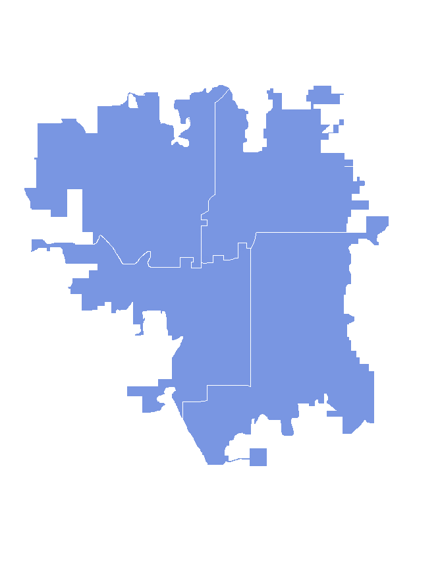
Results by city council district
Baird:
50–60%
Mayor before election
Leirion Gaylor Baird
Democratic
Elected mayor
Leirion Gaylor Baird
Democratic

The 2023 Lincoln, Nebraska mayoral election was held on May 2, 2023, to determine the mayor of Lincoln, Nebraska. It was preceded by a primary election on April 4 where the top two vote-getters, regardless of party affiliation, advanced to the general election. Incumbent Democratic mayor Leirion Gaylor Baird ran for reelection to a second term in office, and was re-elected. The election was officially nonpartisan.

== Primary election ==
=== Declared ===
- Leirion Gaylor Baird, incumbent mayor (2019–present) (party affiliation: Democratic)
- Suzanne Geist, former Nebraska state senator (2017–2023) (party affiliation: Republican)
- Stan Parker, Christian radio executive and former Nebraska Cornhuskers football player (party affiliation: Republican)

=== Declined ===
- Jack Riggins, KLIN radio host (party affiliation: Republican)

=== Endorsements ===
Leirion Gaylor Baird (D)

Organizations

- EMILY's List
- International Association of Fire Fighters 644
Suzanne Geist (R)

Federal officials

- Deb Fischer, U.S. senator from Nebraska (2013–present)

Statewide politicians

- Jim Pillen, governor of Nebraska (2023–present)

Organizations

- Lancaster County Republican Party
- Lincoln Police Union
Stan Parker (R)

U.S. representatives

- Tom Osborne, former U.S. representative from Nebraska's 3rd congressional district (2001–2007)

=== Results ===
Lincoln mayoral primary results, April 4, 2023
Party	Candidate	Votes	%
Nonpartisan	Leirion Gaylor Baird (inc.)	29,216	49.80%
Nonpartisan	Suzanne Geist	19,377	33.03%
Nonpartisan	Stan Parker	10,071	17.17%
Write-in		54	0.09%
Total votes		58,664	100.00%

An additional 670 mailed ballots were received by the Election Commission in the days following the primary election, too late to be counted.

== General election ==
=== Candidates ===
- Leirion Gaylor Baird, incumbent mayor (Democratic)
- Suzanne Geist, former Nebraska state senator (Republican)

=== Debate ===
Host	Date & time	Link(s)	Participants	
Host	Date & time	Link(s)	Baird (D)	Geist (R)
KLKN	April 23, 2023		Present	Present

=== Post-primary endorsements ===
Leirion Gaylor Baird (D)

Organizations

- Nebraska Democratic Party
Suzanne Geist (R)

Individuals

- Stan Parker, Christian radio executive, former Nebraska Cornhuskers football player, and unsuccessful candidate in this election

=== Results ===
Lincoln mayoral general results, May 2, 2023
Party	Candidate	Votes	%
Nonpartisan	Leirion Gaylor Baird (inc.)	44,496	54.65%
Nonpartisan	Suzanne Geist	36,727	45.11%
Write-in		192	0.24%
Turnout		81,587	46.22%

Following the second hourly results pull, Leirion Gaylor Baird was declared the winner and Suzanne Geist conceded.
