= Leirion Gaylor Baird =

American politician in Nebraska

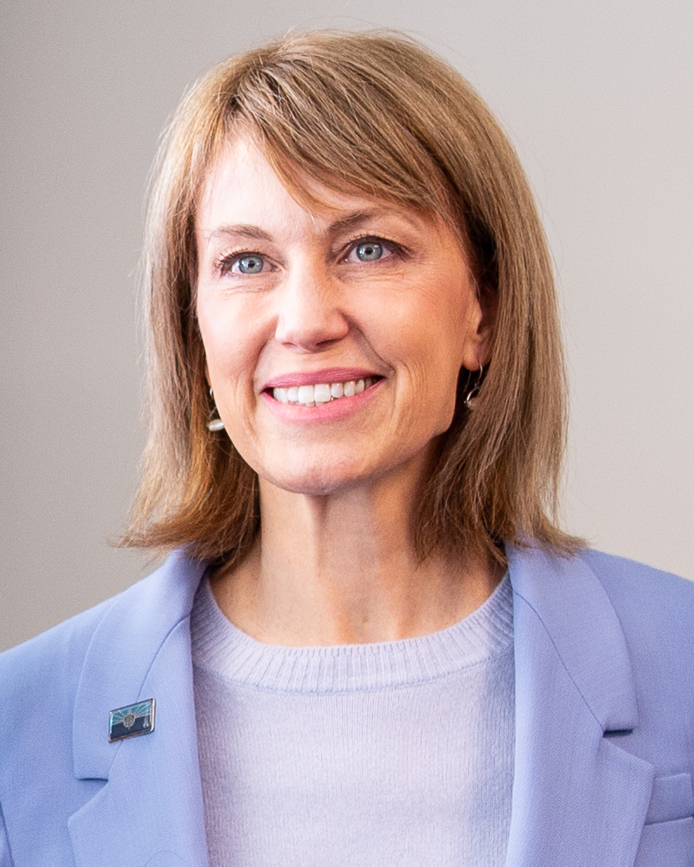

52nd Mayor of Lincoln
- Incumbent
- Assumed office May 20, 2019
- Preceded by: Chris Beutler

Personal details
- Born: June 18, 1971 (age 54)
- Political party: Democratic
- Education: Yale University (BA); New College, Oxford (MS)

Leirion Gaylor Baird (born June 18, 1971) is an American politician who has served as the 52nd mayor of Lincoln, Nebraska, since 2019.

== Early life and education ==
Gaylor Baird grew up in Portland, Oregon; her parents were public school teachers. She completed a Bachelor of Arts in history from Yale College in 1993. She earned a Master of Science in comparative social policy from University of Oxford in 1997.

== Career ==
Baird began her career as a management consultant, working also as a city budget and policy analyst. She was the director of an after-school and summer program in San Francisco. Upon moving to Lincoln, Nebraska, she was appointed to the Lincoln/Lancaster County Planning Commission and helped develop its 2040 Comprehensive Plan. She was elected to the Lincoln City Council as a city-wide representative in May 2013 and was, at the time, its only female member. She won reelection in 2017.

Following the ratification of a term limit amendment by referendum, Baird announced her intention to succeed incumbent three-term Mayor Chris Beutler. Affiliated with the Democratic Party, she officially ran as a nonpartisan candidate due to municipal election law. She won the election for mayor on May 7, 2019, against Republican-affiliated Cyndi Lamm. She was sworn in on May 20, 2019, alongside the new city council.

== Political positions and mayoralty ==
During her campaign for the mayoralty, Baird campaigned on additional road funding for the city, environmental preservation, and community land trusts for housing. During her time as a city councilwoman, she introduced legislation to ban bump stocks in the city.

A recall against Baird was organized in October 2020. LNK Recall objected to the suspension of city charter rules that allowed Pat Lopez to be designated as health director. Organizers needed at least 21,652 signatures by December 23, 2020, to trigger a recall election; they were unable to do so. Baird responded by saying she continued to work as mayor.

Baird was reelected in the 2023 mayoral election. Her two opponents in the primary were Republican state senator Suzanne Geist and Republican Stan Parker.

== Election results ==
=== 2019 ===
Lincoln, Nebraska, Mayoral Election, 2019
Primary election
Party	Candidate	Votes	%
Democratic	Leirion Gaylor Baird	21,660	41.87%
Republican	Cyndi Lamm	18,527	35.81%
Democratic	Jeff Kirkpatrick	8,665	16.75%
Legal Marijuana Now	Krystal Gabel	2,301	4.45%
Nonpartisan	Rene Solc	451	0.87%
	Write-ins	129	0.25%
Turnout		51,733	31.19%
General election
Democratic	Leirion Gaylor Baird	33,692	54.46%
Republican	Cyndi Lamm	27,994	45.25%
	Write-ins	176	0.28%
Turnout		61,862	36.84%
Democratic hold			

=== 2023 ===
Lincoln, Nebraska, Mayoral Election, 2023
Primary election
Party	Candidate	Votes	%
Democratic	Leirion Gaylor Baird (incumbent)	29,216	49.80%
Republican	Suzanne Geist	19,377	33.03%
Republican	Stan Parker	10,071	17.17%
Turnout		58,664	33.38%
General election
Democratic	Leirion Gaylor Baird (incumbent)	44,496	54.65%
Republican	Suzanne Geist	36,727	45.11%
Turnout		81,415	46.11%
Democratic hold			

Political offices
Preceded by Chris Beutler	Mayor of Lincoln; 2019–present	Incumbent
