= MyLINUX =

Defunct Linux magazine published in Romania

- Editor: Emanuel Gliţia
- Categories: Linux magazine
- Frequency: Monthly
- Publisher: Romanian IT&C
- First issue: August 2005
- Final issue: January 2007
- Country: Romania
- Language: Romanian

MyLINUX was a Romanian computer magazine published monthly, specialized on the Linux operating system. Each release contained a small Linux distribution on a CD. It was started in August 2005. The magazine ceased to publish in January 2007, and the final issue was made available for free over the internet in PDF format.

== Profile ==
Each issue of MyLINUX was structured in 10 segments:

1. News - latest news from the Linux world.
2. Software - Linux software reviews.
3. Distributions - Linux distros pinned.
4. Interview - interview with famous open source software developers.
5. Beginner - articles for newbies.
6. Internet - sites of the month
7. LinuxMobil - articles about Linux on mobile devices.
8. LinuxGame - Linux game reviews.
9. LinuxTips - tips 'n' tricks over Linux.
10. /dev/null - humor page.

The editing team consisted of:

1. Rãzvan T. Coloja - Editor in chief
2. Darius Martin - Executive editor
3. Emanuel Gliţia - Editor
4. Mircea Buzlea - Project coordinator, mobile solutions
5. Cristian Mada - Graphics design and DTP
6. Tamas Kiraly - Webmaster

MyLINUX, along with MyHARDWARE, was one of the satellite magazines of MyCOMPUTER, another Romanian IT&C magazine.

== Community site ==
Although the magazine ceased publication, another project is still being kept alive.

The main language of the site is Romanian, however the vast majority of the forum users understand English as well. Over the time an active community has formed around the forum, made up mostly of Unix users.
