= PC Extreme =

Computer magazine

- Categories: Computer magazines
- Frequency: Monthly
- First issue: December 2002
- Final issue Number: August 2005; 30
- Company: Live Publishing International Ltd
- Country: United Kingdom
- Language: English

PC Extreme was a computer magazine published in the UK by Live Publishing International Ltd.

It focussed on modding, overclocking, hardware, hacking (primarily in the technical, rather than the cracking, sense) and video games.

It appeared in December 2002, and was published monthly until August 2005. At that point it was suspended, shortly after which the publishing company went into administration.
