= The Home Computer Course =

British computer magazine

- Cover of issue 4 of The Home Computer Course
- Frequency: Weekly
- Publisher: Orbis Publishing
- Founded: 1983
- Final issue: 1984
- Country: United Kingdom
- Based in: London
- ISSN: 0265-2919

The Home Computer Course (ISSN 0265-2919) was a partwork magazine published by Orbis Publishing in the United Kingdom during 1983 and 1984, covering the subject of home computer technology. It ran for 24 weekly issues, before being succeeded by The Home Computer Advanced Course.

Each issue contained articles on various topics, including computer hardware, software, computer applications, a "Questions and Answers" column, BASIC programming and an in-depth review of a contemporary microcomputer, with annotated exploded view photos of its internals.

The translation to the Spanish version was sold, as the Magazine "Mi Computer"

== See also ==
- Input Magazine
