= PHP Architect =

Programming magazine

- Edited by: Jacki Congdon
- Former editors: Previous editors Oscar Merida; Kara Ferguson; Elizabeth Tucker Long; Steph Fox; Sean Coates; Peter James; Brian K. Jones; Arbi Arzoumani; Marco Tabini
- Categories: Programming; Computers; Web Development
- Frequency: Monthly
- Publisher: Eric Van Johnson; John Congdon
- Founder: Marco Tabini
- Founded: November 6, 2002
- First issue: December 2002; 23 years ago
- Company: PHP Architect, LLC
- Country: United States
- Based in: San Diego, CA
- Language: English
- Website: www.phparch.com
- ISSN: 1709-7169 (print); 2375-3544 (web)
- OCLC: 53905041

PHP Architect is a monthly magazine dedicated to the PHP programming language and Web development. In addition to the magazine, PHP Architect organizes conferences, produces podcasts, provides training courses and materials, and publishes books, all with a focus on PHP and related web development topics.

== History ==
Marco Tabini founded Marco Tabini & Associates, Inc. (MTA) in 1998 as a Toronto-based software consulting firm specializing in web development. In 1999, MTA entered the publishing industry when it began publishing Nonsologiochi, an online Italian video gaming magazine. Spurred by an interested in publishing and the company's use of PHP in its consulting work, MTA launched PHP Architect on November 6, 2002, which was soon followed by the publication of its first issue in December 2002.

Originally available in PDF format only, PHP Architect first introduced a print edition with the September 2003 issue. In late 2009, the magazine returned to a PDF-only subscription format, due to the expense and difficulties involved in producing a print magazine. In February 2011, the magazine added EPUB and MOBI formats to its subscription offerings. The November 2013 issue once again saw a return to print publication using a print-on-demand system, with all print subscriptions having access to the full digital back catalog.

Throughout its publication history, PHP Architect has experienced a number of organizational changes. MTA published PHP Architect from December 2002 (vol. 1, no. 1) until January 2011 (vol. 10, no. 1). In 2008, MTA announced a partnership with Keith Casey to launch a new consulting company, Blue Parabola, LLC. However, it wasn't until February 2011 (vol. 10, no. 2) that PHP Architect noted the change from MTA to Blue Parabola as its publisher in the magazine's production notes. On January 1, 2013, Alexandria, VA-based Musketeers.me, LLC announced its acquisition of PHP Architect and associated brand assets and products. Musketeers.me published PHP Architect from January 2013 (vol. 12, no. 1) until September 2021 (vol. 20, no. 9), when the magazine again changed ownership to San Diego, CA-based DiegoDev, LLC. Under owners Eric Van Johnson and John Congdon, DiegoDev reformed as PHP Architect, LLC and began publishing PHP Architect from October 2021 (vol. 20, no. 10).

From December 2002 (vol. 1, no. 1) until May 2013 (vol. 12, no. 5), the magazine title was styled as php|architect, and from June 2013 (vol. 12, no. 6) until January 2025 (vol. 24, no. 1), the title was styled as php[architect].

== Books ==
- Ahto, Jouni (2005). php|architect's Pocket PHP Reference. Toronto: Marco Tabini & Associates. ISBN 978-0-9738621-3-3.
- Sweat, Jason (2005). php|architect's Guide to PHP Design Patterns. Toronto: Marco Tabini & Associates. ISBN 978-0-9735898-2-5.
- Alshanetsky, Ilia (2005). php|architect's Guide to PHP Security. Toronto: Marco Tabini & Associates. ISBN 978-0-9738621-0-2.
- Kimsal, Mark (2008). php|architect's Guide to Programming Magento. Toronto: Marco Tabini & Associates. ISBN 978-0-9738621-7-1.
- Turland, Matthew (2010). php|architect's Guide to Web Scraping With PHP. Toronto: Marco Tabini & Associates. ISBN 978-0-9810345-1-5.
- Evans, Cal (2008). php|architect's Guide to Programming With Zend Framework. Toronto: Marco Tabini & Associates. ISBN 978-0-9738621-5-7.
- Priebsch, Stefan (2008). php|architect's Guide to PHP Migration. Toronto: Marco Tabini & Associates. ISBN 978-09738621-9-5.
- Rethans, Derick (2009). php|architect's Guide to Date and Time Programming. Toronto: Marco Tabini & Associates. ISBN 978-0-9810345-0-8.
- Mann, Eric (2017). Security Principles for PHP Applications. Alexandria: php[architect]. ISBN 978-1940111612.
