= The Home Computer Advanced Course =

- Cover of issue 85 of The Home Computer Advanced Course
- Frequency: Weekly
- Publisher: Orbis Publishing
- Founded: 1984
- Final issue: 1985
- Country: United Kingdom
- Based in: London
- ISSN: 0265-2919

The Home Computer Advanced Course was a partwork published by Orbis in the UK during 1984 and 1985. It provided a comprehensive introduction to computing and computer technology for home computer users, and ran for 96 weekly issues, succeeding the earlier 24-part The Home Computer Course.

Each issue contained articles on various topics. Subjects included computer applications, computer hardware and software technology, concepts in computer science, practical electronics projects, BASIC and machine code programming, other programming languages, operating systems (including MS-DOS and Unix), and a jargon dictionary.

== See also ==
- The Home Computer Course
