= PC Today =

American technology magazine

- Volume 11, Issue 10 cover
- Categories: Computer magazine
- Frequency: Monthly
- Publisher: Sandhills Publishing Company
- Final issue: July 2017
- Country: USA
- Based in: Lincoln, Nebraska

PC Today (Later Cyber Trend) was a monthly mobile computing and technology computer magazine published by Sandhills Publishing Company in Lincoln, Nebraska, US.

== History and profile ==
The article and editorial content focused primarily around mobile and Wireless technologies, notebooks, mobile phones, PDAs, Windows, and office and home software. The magazine was renamed CyberTrend in 2014, which was distributed to business-class hotels, airline clubs, and fixed-base operators. The magazine also included classified advertising. Nancy Hammel served as the editor-in-chief of the magazine when it was published under the title of PC Today. The magazine ceased publication in July 2017.
