= Sandhills Global =

American information processing company

- Type: Private
- Industry: Technology
- Founded: 1978; 48 years ago, in Webster City, Iowa, U.S.
- Founders: Tom Peed, Rhonda Peed
- Headquarters: Lincoln, Nebraska, U.S.
- Area served: Worldwide
- Key people: Shawn Peed (CEO)
- Products: Trade Publications, Hosted Websites, Technology Services
- Website: sandhills.com

Sandhills Global is a privately held American information processing company that produces a diverse range of products and services from well-established trade publications and websites to hosted technology services. The company primarily serves the transportation, agriculture, aircraft, and heavy machinery industries in the United States, Canada, Latin America, South America, EMEA, Africa, Asia, and Australasia.

== History ==
The company was first established by Tom and Rhonda Peed as Peed Corp. in 1978 in Webster City, Iowa. In 1985, the headquarters were relocated to a 68-acre (280,000 m^{2}) campus in the Highlands neighborhood of Lincoln, Nebraska, where it remains. In June 2000, Sandhills added a data center in Scottsdale, Arizona. In 2011, the company completed another data center on its Lincoln, Nebraska campus, a LEED Gold-rated building that houses the company's server farm and has three living roofs.

The Lincoln campus expanded in 2015 with an additional IT facility. In the same year, Sandhills worked with Goss International, a company that supplies presses and finishing systems, to install a new press and saddle-stitcher to expand its printing operations. In 2017, Sandhills announced the construction of the 42,000-square-foot (3,900-m^{2}) Cyber Center facility, which houses 240 employee workstations, a reception area and cafe space, classrooms, and other training facilities. Sandhills opened an additional office location in Sidney, Nebraska in 2017.

== Publications and brands ==
Sandhills Global's trade publications include TractorHouse, Machinery Trader, Truck Paper, CraneTrader, Tree & Landscape Equipment Trader, RentalYard, and AuctionTime, in addition to Controller, Executive Controller, and Charter Hub. Each print publication also has a companion website.

Sandhills' portfolio also includes software and online services such as the AddAShop e-commerce platform, Aircraft Cost Calculator, EquineMarket, Equipmentfacts, Fast Track Iron, FleetEvauator, FR8Star, LiftsToday, LivestockMarket, MotorSportsUniverse, OilFieldTrader, OtherStock, PavingEquipment, PowerSystemsToday, SpecialtyCropEQ, TelematicsPlus fleet management software, UtilityTrailersToday, Value Insight Portal (VIP) asset valuation tool for equipment and trucks, and others.

== Community involvement ==
Sandhills has supported several charitable organizations, chiefly in Nebraska, including the Food Bank of Lincoln, the YMCA of Lincoln, the Lincoln Children's Zoo, Madonna Rehabilitation Hospital, the Lincoln Community Playhouse, Junior Achievement, Habitat for Humanity, and Special Olympics.

In March 2023, Sandhills announced a $4 million gift to the Lincoln Youth Complex development project, which includes nine baseball and softball fields in Lincoln, Nebraska. In August 2023, the Lancaster County Agricultural Society approved a contract with Sandhills for naming rights to the Lancaster Event Center, which, as a result, was renamed Sandhills Global Event Center for a period of 15 years.

In the 2023 Lincoln, Nebraska mayoral election, the Peed family and Sandhills Global contributed nearly $1.09 million to Republican Suzanne Geist's campaign, and $535,000 to a political action committee running attack ads against incumbent Democrat Leirion Gaylor Baird.

== International subsidiaries and region-specific brands ==
Sandhills Global has two international subsidiaries, Sandhills East and Sandhills Pacific. Sandhills East has office locations in Manchester, UK; Colonnella, Italy; and Johannesburg, South Africa. Sandhills Pacific is based in Brisbane, Australia with an additional office location in Christchurch, New Zealand. Sandhills' international brands include MarketBook, Farm & Plant Buyers Guide, Farm Machinery Locator, Truck Locator, CamionSuperMarket, Machinery Trader Resale Weekly, Truck Buy & Sell International, Aviation Trader, and TruckWorld.
