= Computer Buyer =

Former British computer and technology magazine

- Categories: Computer Magazine
- Frequency: Monthly
- Publisher: Dennis Publishing
- Founded: 1991
- Final issue: March 2009
- Country: United Kingdom
- Based in: London
- Language: English

Computer Buyer was a British monthly computer and technology magazine published by Dennis Publishing. The magazine was headquartered in London, United Kingdom.

== History and profile ==
Computer Buyer was started in 1991. It was part of Dennis Publishing. The magazine was headquartered in London. It was published on a monthly basis and covered articles about buying technological equipment. The magazine was redesigned in 2006. In March 2009 the magazine ceased publication due to low circulation figures. Its assets were merged with sister title Computer Shopper.

In 2007 the circulation of Computer Buyer was 9,477 copies.
