= Code Camp =

Conference for software developers

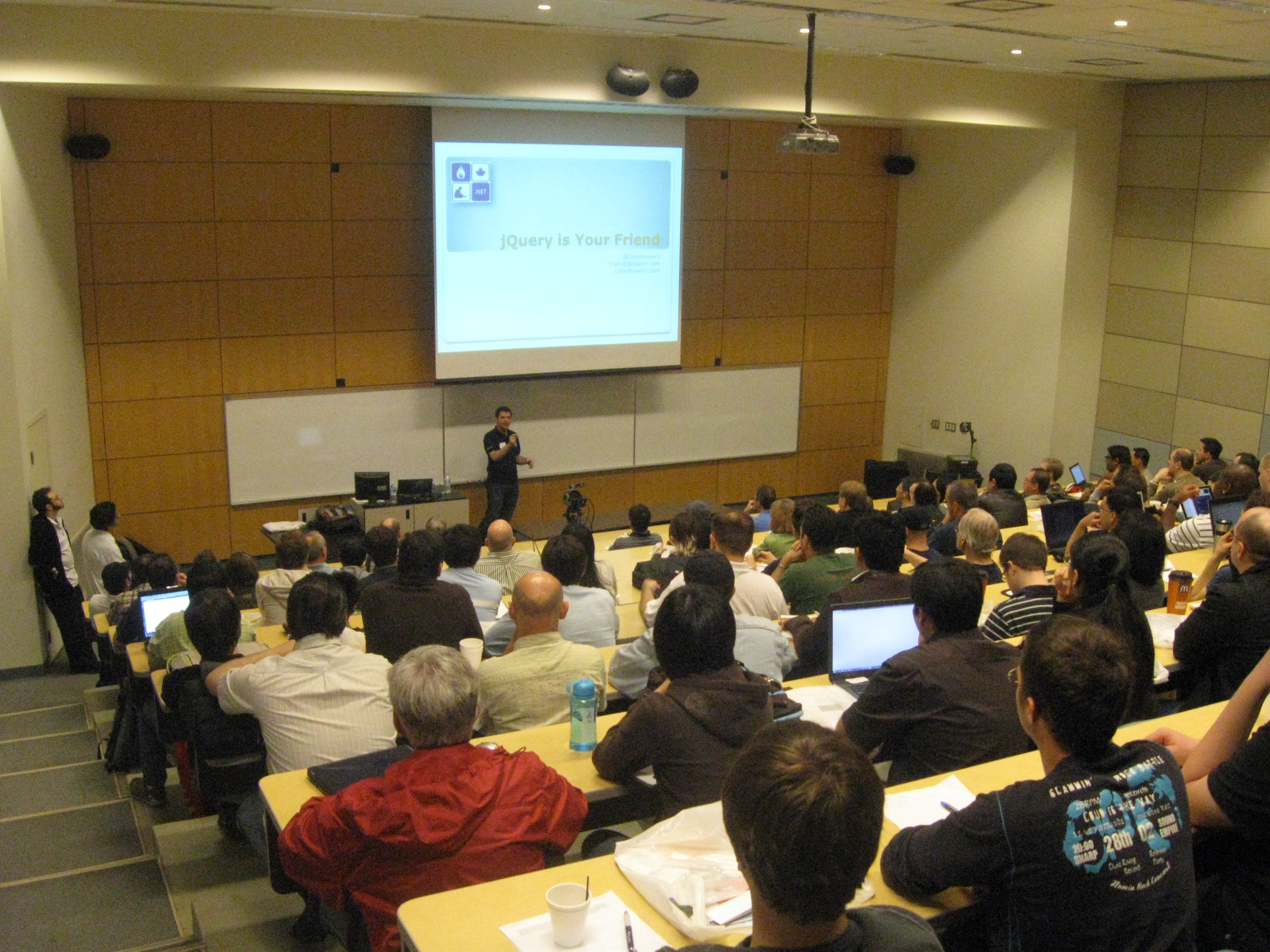
Toronto Code Camp 2010

Code Camp is a type of unconference that was initially established to assist software developers who were unable to participate in professional activities during standard working hours. The content of these classes ranges from certification and coding interview training to data structures and algorithms that pertain to the project the company is working on.

The initiative, which began in 2004, was first held in Boston under the leadership of Thom Robbins and other local developer community leaders. It offers technical presentations and access to specialized technical content. The concept of Code Camps has been influential in the genesis of similar 'Camp' style events, such as BarCamp.

Originally, Code Camps were more closely associated with Microsoft Windows or .NET platforms, with the first-ever Code Camp being held at the Microsoft Northeast Region office in Waltham, Massachusetts. They have since broadened their scope. There are now online programs, such as FreeCodeCamp, which offer a similar style of learning. There are also many programs designed for beginners, with some being held for children.

These camps are known for being free and are typically held outside normal work hours. Like most unconferences, Code Camps focus on the local or regional development community. Community members contribute by suggesting topics and often act as presenters, fostering a collaborative and participatory atmosphere among peers.
