= Amiga Addict =

British computer magazine

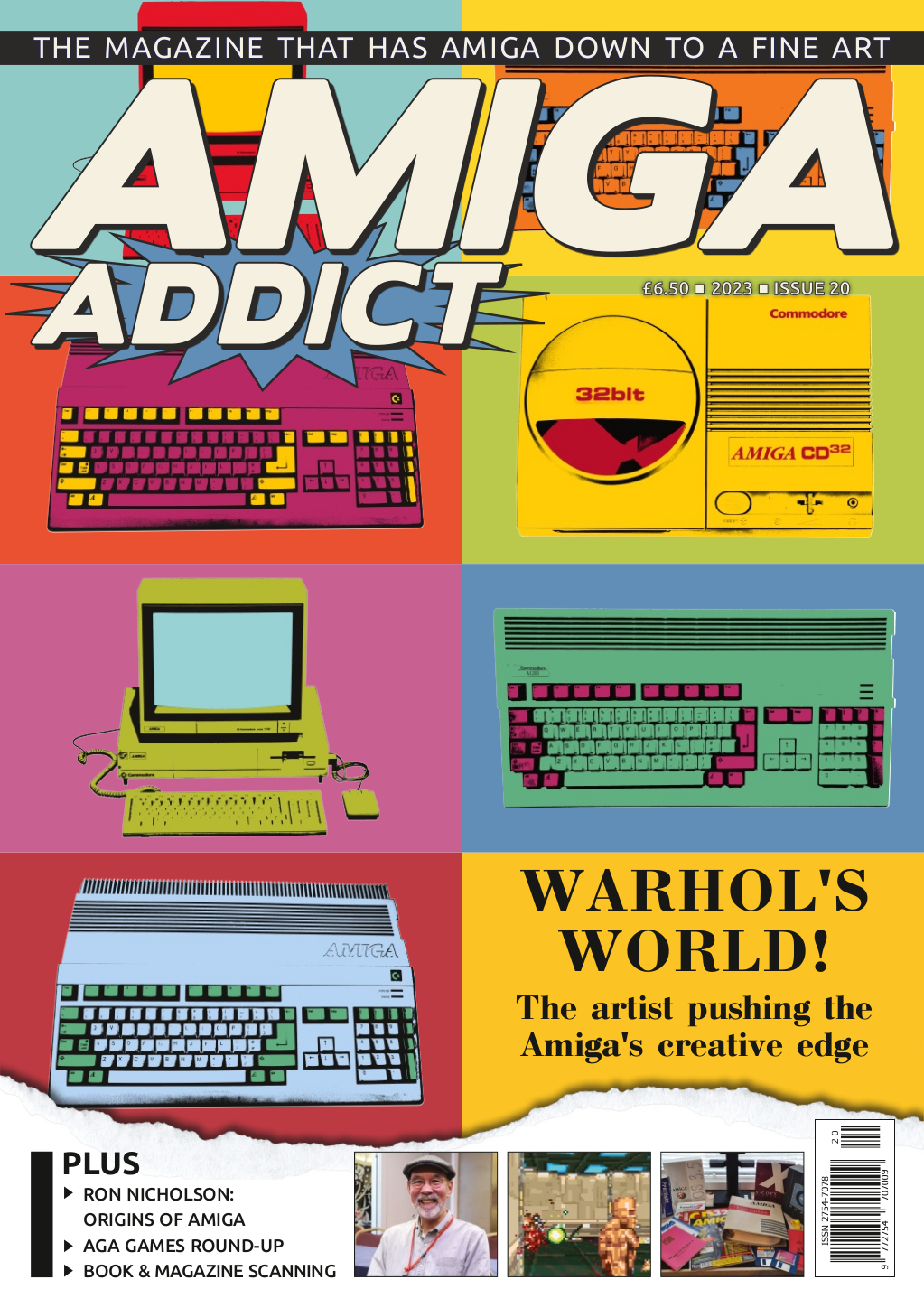
- Amiga Addict #20, April 2023, Includes the story of Andy Warhol and Debbie Harry at the Amiga's launch
- Editor: Ian Griffiths
- Games editor: James Walker
- Founder: Jonah Naylor
- Categories: Amiga, video games
- Frequency: Every six weeks
- Publisher: Simulant Systems
- First issue: December 2020; 5 years ago
- Country: United Kingdom
- Based in: York
- Language: English

Amiga Addict was the first Amiga magazine to be sold in newsagents in the UK and internationally since Total Amiga magazine ceased in 2007 which has resulted in praise from the wider games press for the magazine's quality and courage, partly due to the challenges the publication faces in keeping the Amiga relevant now that it is an older niche platform.

Amiga Addict is a six weekly computer magazine published by Simulant Systems for users and enthusiasts of Commodore Amiga computers and later PPC derivatives. The first issue was published in December 2020 despite using the title "Issue No. 1 January 2021". The magazine was founded by Jonah Naylor and aims to preserve the history of Amiga computer hardware, games and software by interviewing ex-industry professionals whilst celebrating the continuing Amiga scene.

The magazine is split into sections, which include Regulars (such as readers letters, demoscene and coverdisk), Onscreen (games reviews), Amiga Focus (modern community), Amiga Insights (interviews) and Testbench (hardware/software reviews).

Amiga Addict is currently active and listed in The British Library archives, with registered ISSN number 2754-706X.

== Notable featured content ==
Since launch, Amiga Addict has documented key events in the Amiga's history, such as the A1000's initial design and specification. Issue 1 included an exclusive interview with Amiga hardware engineer Dave Haynie. Issue 2 featured special guests from DMA Design, with Mike Dailly and David Jones who recount the story of how the world's most successful games studio (responsible for Lemmings and Grand Theft Auto) started out and swiftly evolved. In later issues, readers obtained insights from legends such as Trip Hawkins (founder of Electronic Arts), Sensible Software's Stoo Cambridge and hardware engineer Joseph C. Decuir (who worked on Amiga and Atari computers, as well as Bluetooth, IEEE and USB). Numerous other figures significant in computing history have been interviewed too, with backstories documented on the development of groundbreaking games like Revolution Software's Beneath a Steel Sky and Team17's Alien Breed. Software studio histories are also published, thus far profiles on Digita International, Lucasfilm Games and Core Design have all appeared.

The 40th issue was published in tribute to Amiga Format, replicating the design of that magazine.

Amiga Addict magazine also publish their own coverdisks, including software and games in floppy disk or CD-ROM format. These are not included with every issue.
