= Suzanne Geist =

American politician (born 1961)

Member of the Nebraska Legislature from the 25th district
- In office January 4, 2017 – April 6, 2023
- Preceded by: Kathy Campbell
- Succeeded by: Carolyn Bosn

Personal details
- Born: Suzanne Henderson; November 21, 1961 (age 64) St. Louis, Missouri, U.S.
- Party: Republican
- Education: University of Nebraska–Lincoln (BA)

Suzanne Geist (née Henderson; born November 21, 1961) is an American politician who served as a member of the state legislature in the U.S. state of Nebraska from 2017 until her resignation in 2023. She graduated from Pine Bluff High School in Pine Bluff, Arkansas in 1980. Afterwards, she attended the University of Nebraska–Lincoln and graduated with a bachelor's degree in journalism and broadcasting in 1984.

In 2016, Geist was elected to represent the 25th Nebraska legislative district, which encompasses the northeast quarter of Lancaster County including the city of Waverly and the eastern portions of the city of Lincoln.

Geist was a candidate in the 2023 Lincoln, Nebraska mayoral election. One day after the primary election, she announced that she would resign as a state senator the subsequent day in order to focus her attention on the mayor's race. She proceeded to lose the general election on May 2, 2023.

== Pro Life Advocacy ==
Geist co-sponsored a ban of abortion without exception for rape or incest in 2022 in the Nebraska Legislature. In 2022, she was the sponsor of a bill that would restrict medical abortion, including prohibiting delivery by mail and establishing misdemeanor criminal offenses for doctors violating the provisions. Neither of these bills passed within the legislature.

Nebraska's current law banning a subset of abortion procedures referred to in the law as "dismemberment abortion" was sponsored and prioritized by Geist in the 2020 legislative session.

Geist attended "Statesmen Academy" training from the Family Policy Foundation, an anti-abortion group which trains politicians to participate in American culture war.

During the 2023 Lincoln Mayor's race, at a debate attended by many in the city's Black community, Geist made this widely-reported remark:

Those of you who are African American, let me speak to you. You are 4.78% of our population, but 21% of abortions are from your community. Twenty million of you have been aborted. Is that positive for your community? No, it's not! That's why I'm pro-life. It's not because I want to restrict women; it's because I want you to be free.

== Electoral history ==
=== 2016 ===
Nebraska's 25th Legislative District Election, 2016
Primary election
Party	Candidate	Votes	%
Republican	Suzanne Geist	4,004	36.05%
Democratic	Jim Gordon	3,592	32.34%
Republican	Les Spry	1,696	15.27%
Republican	Dale Michels	1,441	12.97%
Independent	David Tagart	351	3.16%
Total votes		11,106	100.00%
General election
Republican	Suzanne Geist	12,899	55.61%
Democratic	Jim Gordon	10,258	44.23%
Total votes		23,194	100.00%
Republican hold			

=== 2020 ===
Nebraska's 25th Legislative District Election, 2020
Primary election
Party	Candidate	Votes	%
Republican	Suzanne Geist (incumbent)	10,407	71.34%
Democratic	Stephany Pleasant	4,151	28.45%
Total votes		14,588	100.00%
General election
Republican	Suzanne Geist (incumbent)	16,443	66.53%
Democratic	Stephany Pleasant	8,207	33.21%
Total votes		24,716	100.00%
Republican hold			

=== 2023 ===
Lincoln, Nebraska, Mayoral Election, 2023
Primary election
Party	Candidate	Votes	%
Democratic	Leirion Gaylor Baird (incumbent)	29,216	49.80%
Republican	Suzanne Geist	19,377	33.03%
Republican	Stan Parker	10,071	17.17%
Turnout		58,664	33.38%
General election
Democratic	Leirion Gaylor Baird (incumbent)	44,496	54.65%
Republican	Suzanne Geist	36,727	45.11%
Turnout		81,415	46.11%
Democratic hold			
