= Amiga World =

American magazine

- February 1992 cover
- Publisher: IDG Publishing
- First issue: 1985
- Final issue: April 1995
- Based in: Peterborough, New Hampshire
- Language: English
- ISSN: 0883-2390
- OCLC: 12094310

Amiga World was a magazine dedicated to the Amiga computer platform. It was a prominent Amiga magazine, particularly in the United States, and was published by Massachusetts-based IDG Publishing from 1985 until April 1995. The first several issues were distributed before the computer was available for sale to the public. Issue 3, (Vol 2 No 1, January 1986) featured the artist Andy Warhol. The headquarters of the magazine later moved to Peterborough, New Hampshire.

== See also ==
- RUN, the parent magazine from which Amiga World was spun off.
- Amiga Survivor
