= Amiga Survivor =

- Categories: Amiga, video games
- Frequency: Every month
- Publisher: Crystal Software
- First issue: May 1998; 26 years ago
- Country: United Kingdom
- Based in: Leeds
- Language: English

Amiga Survivor was a monthly computer magazine published by Crystal Software. The first issue was published in June/July 1998. This publication originally started as a black and white A5 size fanzine called The Domain but eventually became a full-colour A4 magazine. In 2000 the magazine was sold to CS&E. Robert Iveson served as the editor of the magazine. The magazine ceased publication in 2001.
