= Raby =

Raby may refer to:

== Places ==
=== Australia ===
- Raby, Catherine Field, a heritage-listed house in Catherine Field, a suburb in south-western Sydney, New South Wales
- Raby, New South Wales, a suburb of Sydney, New South Wales
- Raby Bay, a bay within Moreton Bay, Queensland

=== Czech Republic ===
- Ráby, a village in the Pardubice Region

=== United Kingdom ===
- Raby Castle, a castle in County Durham, England
- Raby, Cumbria, a village in Cumbria, England
- Raby, Merseyside, a village on the Wirral Peninsula, Merseyside, England

=== Sweden ===
- Råby, Håbo Municipality, Uppsala County

== People ==
- Baron Raby, several people with this title

=== Surname ===
- Albert Raby (1933–1988), American teacher in Chicago
- Asher Raby (born 1946), Israeli serial killer
- Augustin-Jérôme Raby (1745–1822), Canadian pilot and political figure
- Ethel Raby (1914–2008), English athlete
- Fiona Raby (born 1963), British artist
- Frederic James Edward Raby (1888–1966), English Latinist
- Geoff Raby (born 1953), Australian economist and diplomat
- Gyllian Raby (born 1959), Canadian playwright, director, and dramaturg
- Henry Raby (politician), American politician
- Henry James Raby (1827–1907), recipient of the Victoria Cross
- Ian Raby (1921–1967), British racing driver
- James Joseph Raby (1874–1934), Rear Admiral of the US Navy
- Joe Raby (1873–1954), English footballer
- Noah Raby (died 1904), American notable for his longevity claim
- Philip Raby (born 1963), UK motoring journalist
- Steve Raby (born 1958), American politician
- Walter Raby (1902–1973), English footballer

=== Given name ===
- Raby George (born 1992), Swedish footballer
- Raby Howell (1869–1937), English footballer
- Raby Vane (1736–1769), Royal Navy officer and MP

== Other ==
- USS Raby (DE-698), a destroyer escort named after Admiral James Raby
- USS Raby (DE-190), a World War II destroyer escort
