= Imagine Publishing =

British magazine publisher

- Type: Private limited
- Industry: Magazine publishing
- Founded: 14 May 2005; 21 years ago
- Defunct: October 21, 2016
- Fate: Acquired by Future plc
- Successor: Future plc
- Headquarters: Bournemouth, England, UK
- Area served: United Kingdom
- Key people: Damian Butt (Managing Director); Steve Boyd (Finance Director); Aaron Asadi (Publishing Director); Marco Peroni (UK Finance Director); Jane Hawkins (Production Director); Cathy Blackman (Head of International Licensing); Darren Pearce (Circulation Director)
- Website: imagine-publishing.co.uk

Imagine Publishing was a UK-based magazine publisher, which published a number of video games, computing, creative and lifestyle magazines. The company was acquired by Future plc on 21 October 2016.

== History ==
Imagine Publishing was founded on 14 May 2005 with private funds by Damian Butt, Steven Boyd and Mark Kendrick, all were former directors of Paragon Publishing, and launched with a core set of six gaming and creative computing titles in the first 6 months of trading.

In October 2005, it had acquired the only retro games magazine Retro Gamer, after its original publisher, Live Publishing went bankrupt. Early in 2006, it further acquired the rights to publish a considerable number of titles including gamesTM, Play, PowerStation, X360, Digital Photographer and iCreate, from the old Paragon Publishing stable of magazines when owner Highbury House Communications went into liquidation, following Future Publishing's withdrawal of its offer to buy the company, due to threats of a monopoly investigation by the United Kingdom Competition Commission.

In May 2006, Imagine launched its first bookazines, initially focusing on technology content for Photoshop and Mac. This portfolio would become one of Imagine's core strengths, with worldwide distribution, notably in the US and Australia.

In 2007 Imagine launched SciFiNow, the Official Corel Painter Magazine, HD Review and Total PC Gaming.

Total 911 was acquired from 9 Publishing in 2008, and was purchased to demonstrate that Imagine's efficient publishing model could be applied to any market, not just technology.

In 2009, the company launched its most successful magazine, How It Works.

Linux User & Developer was acquired in 2009. 3D Artist was launched into the niche CGI magazine market. Imagine's main videogames website NowGamer.com went live in 2009 also.

In partnership with PixelMags, Imagine became the second publisher to migrate its entire portfolio as digital editions on the iPad/iPhone for the US launch in March 2010.

Imagine launched the world's third title for the Android OS - Android Magazine in 2011, following successful bookazine tests of this topic.

2011 also saw Imagine embrace digital publishing further by giving all employees a free iPad, or cash alternative.

In 2012 Imagine expanded its knowledge magazine division with new launch All About Space, followed in 2013 with All About History and World of Animals. A new digital editions publishing platform - Martini - went live in this year, with all Imagine titles migrating onto this bespoke platform, developed in partnership with Bournemouth-based tech company 3SidedCube.

Imagine was featured in the Sunday Times Profit Track 100 lists in 2013 and 2014; recognising the company's strong financial results, including a high net margin.

In 2015 the company moved into a new market, with Real Crime magazine. To celebrate its tenth year in publishing, free engraved iPad Mini were offered to all staff.

Imagine's final two magazine launches were in 2016, with History of Royals in April and Explore History in May.

At the point when it was acquired by Future plc, Imagine Publishing was a worldwide multimedia content producer and in October 2016 it had a portfolio of 20 regular print magazines, 25 websites, 30 mobile apps and a portfolio of over 1,200 bookazines - all published worldwide within the four key markets – technology, photography, knowledge/science and videogames.

== Key titles ==
Key magazine titles published by Imagine Publishing up until Future's acquisition included:

- Play
- GamesTM
- Retro Gamer
- SciFiNow
- Digital Photographer
- iCreate
- Web Designer
- Photoshop Creative
- Total 911
- Linux User and Developer
- 3D Artist
- How It Works
- All About Space
- All About History
- World of Animals
- History of War
- NowGamer.com
- Gadget
- Real Crime
- History of Royals
- boot (ISSN 1088-5439)
- Practical Digital Video
- Windows XP Made Easy
- Digital Camera Buyer
- PC Home

Most of Imagine's publications (with the exception of SciFiNow, which later sold to Kelsey Media) are now owned by Future plc.
