= USS Corbesier =

USS Corbesier may refer to the following ships of the United States Navy:

- USS Corbesier (DE-106), a planned Cannon-class destroyer escort that was transferred to the Free French Naval Forces as Sénégalais in 1943; permanently transferred to France in 1952; scrapped in 1965
- USS Corbesier (DE-438), a John C. Butler-class destroyer escort launched in 1944; decommissioned in 1946; scrapped in 1973
