= Gemma Lavender =

British astronomer and writer

- Born: 13 September 1986 (age 39); Chatham, Kent, England, UK
- Education: Ysgol Dyffryn Taf School
- Alma mater: Cardiff University
- Scientific career
- Fields: Astronomy

Gemma Lavender (born 13 September 1986) is a British astronomer, author and journalist. She was the longest-serving editor of All About Space, a monthly scientific magazine owned by British publisher Future plc and before the publication's closure in October 2024. Lavender was also the Editor in Chief of Future plc's science portfolio before announcing that she would be stepping into the role of Content Director of Knowledge and Education in October 2021. Lavender has authored books on quantum physics, astronomy and astrophysics. She became Content Director of Space.com and Live Science in February 2022, leaving the position in January 2023 to join the European Space Agency.

== Personal life ==
Lavender was born in Chatham, Kent and relocated to Pembrokeshire, Wales, at a young age. She attended Ysgol Dyffryn Taf in Whitland and furthered her education at Cardiff University, graduating with a Master of Physics degree in astrophysics. Lavender has been linked to Astronomy Now magazine, the Institute of Physics and NASA as a writer. She was elected as a fellow of the Royal Astronomical Society in 2011.
