= Farewill =

UK business

- Type: Subsidiary
- Industry: Legal technology; Funeral services
- Founded: 24 July 2015; 11 years ago in London, England
- Founders: Dan Garrett; Tom Rogers
- Headquarters: 27 Downham Rd, Dalston, London, England
- Area served: United Kingdom
- Services: Will writing; Probate; Cremation
- Owner: Dignity Group
- Number of employees: 84+
- Website: farewill.com

Farewill is a subsidiary of Dignity Group that provides will-writing, probate, and cremation services in the UK. The company was founded in 2015 and is registered in England and Wales with the Law Society.

== History ==
Farewill was founded in 2015 by Dan Garrett and Tom Rogers. Garrett was inspired to start the company after designing products for elderly residents in a care home in Tokyo. He later organized funerals and gained a qualification in will writing, which led to the founding of Farewill.

In 2016, Tracy Doree, an angel investor and founder of venture capital firm Kindred Capital, joined Farewill as its chairperson.

== Services ==
Farewill offers will-writing (online and over the phone), a direct cremation service, a probate service, and a subscription-based will-update service. The company stated in 2020 that users could complete an online will in 15 minutes for £90, with an additional £10 per year for unlimited updates. Direct cremations started from £980.

In response to concerns about data privacy, in 2016 Farewill stated that user data was stored on Amazon's Secure Storage Service in Ireland and encrypted using AES-256 encryption.

In 2019, Farewill was named the National Will Writing Firm of the Year.

== Charity partnerships ==
Farewill has partnered with 50 UK charities, including Cancer Research UK, British Heart Foundation, Macmillan, The Royal British Legion, and Christian Aid. The charities provide access to the will-writing service to encourage bequests to their organizations.

== Funding and acquisition ==
Farewill has undergone several funding rounds. In January 2019, the company raised £7.5 million in a series A round. In July 2020 Farewill raised £20 million in a series B round led by Highland Europe, with a valuation of £70 million. This funding was intended to expand and improve their services across the UK.

In 2023, Farewill crowdfunded at a valuation of £25,775,000, a reduction from the 2020 valuation.

Farewill was acquired by funeral services provider Dignity in October 2024 for £12.9 million in stock. The deal was described by Tech Crunch as "a fire sale by just about any estimation".
