= French frigate Sénégalais =

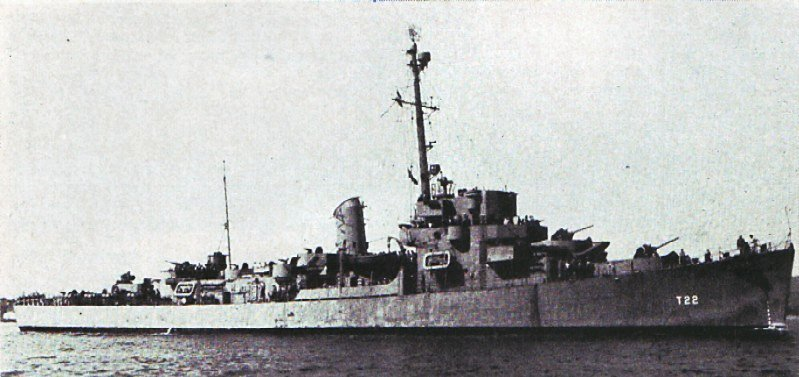
- Starboard view of Free French Destroyer Escort Sénégalais (T-22).

History

United States
- Name: USS Corbesier
- Namesake: Antoine Joseph Corbesier
- Builder: Dravo Corporation, Wilmington, Delaware
- Laid down: 24 April 1943
- Launched: 11 November 1943
- Fate: Transferred to Free France, 2 January 1944
- Stricken: 14 May 1952

History

Free France
- Name: Sénégalais (T-22)
- Namesake: Senegal
- Acquired: 2 January 1944

History

France
- Name: Sénégalais (F-02)
- Acquired: 14 October 1946
- Renamed: Yser, for Yser, August 1962
- Reclassified: frigate Sénégalais (F-702) 1952
- Stricken: May 1965
- Fate: 1965 sold for scrap to Walter Ritscher, Hamburg

General characteristics
- Class & type: Cannon-class destroyer escort
- Displacement: 1,240 long tons (1,260 t) standard; 1,620 long tons (1,646 t) full
- Length: 306 ft (93 m) o/a; 300 ft (91 m) w/l
- Beam: 36 ft 10 in (11.23 m)
- Draft: 8 ft 9 in (2.67 m)
- Propulsion: 4 × GM Mod. 16-278A diesel engines with electric drive, 6,000 shp (4,474 kW), 2 screws
- Speed: 21 knots (39 km/h; 24 mph)
- Range: 10,800 nmi (20,000 km) at 12 kn (22 km/h; 14 mph)
- Complement: 15 officers and 201 enlisted
- Armament: 3 × single Mk.22 3"/50 caliber guns; 1 × twin 40 mm Mk.1 AA gun; 8 × 20 mm Mk.4 AA guns; 3 × 21-inch (533 mm) torpedo tubes; 1 × Hedgehog Mk.10 anti-submarine mortar; 8 × Mk.6 depth charge projectors; 2 × Mk.9 depth charge tracks

Yser, originally named Sénégalais, was a destroyer in the French Navy during World War II and the French Navy post-war. The ship was originally built as USS Corbesier (DE-106), an American Cannon-class destroyer escort named for Antoine Joseph Corbesier, for more than 40 years the beloved swordmaster of U.S. Naval Academy midshipmen. The name Corbesier (DE-106) was cancelled 24 September 1943 so it could be used for USS Corbesier (DE-438).

== History ==
During World War II, Corbesier was transferred to the Free French Naval Forces under lend lease on 2 January 1944, and renamed Sénégalais. Ownership of the vessel was transferred to France on 21 April 1952 under the Mutual Defense Assistance Program. She was renamed Yser about that same time.

=== World War II ===
In the night on 2/3 May 1944, U-371 was spotted recharging her batteries on the surface off Djidjelli on the Algerian coast. The area was swamped with six escorts from the convoy GUS-38 and three aircraft squadrons. At 01.18 hours on 3 May, the U-boat managed to damage Menges with a Gnat in the stern. The other vessels hunted the U-boat until the early morning of 4 May, when its commander had to surface his boat and save his crew, but at 04.04 hours he still fought back and also damaged the FFL Sénégalais (T 22) with a Gnat before scuttling the U-boat.

=== First Indochina War ===
Sénégalais was sent to the far east in October 1945 and later participated in the First Indochina War.

== See also ==
- List of escorteurs of the French Navy
