= Linux User and Developer =

British magazine

- Cover of the final issue (196)
- Editor: Chris Thornett
- Categories: Computing, Linux
- Frequency: Monthly
- First issue: September 1999
- Final issue Number: September 2018; 196
- Company: Future plc
- Country: United Kingdom
- Based in: Bournemouth
- Website: Official Linux User & Developer website
- ISSN: 2041-3270

Linux User & Developer was a monthly magazine about Linux and related Free and open source software published by Future. It was a UK magazine written specifically for Linux professionals and IT decision makers. It was available worldwide in newsagents or via subscription, and it could be downloaded via Zinio or Apple's Newsstand.

== History and profile ==
Linux User & Developer was first published in September 1999. In August 2014 its sister magazine, RasPi, was launched.

The magazine was acquired by Future plc (owner of competing title Linux Format) as part of its acquisition of Imagine Publishing in 2016.

The last issue of Linux User & Developer was on 20 September 2018 (#196). All previous subscribers received issues of Linux Format as compensation for the next remaining issues of their subscription.

== Staff ==
- Chris Thornett - Editor
