= Japanese submarine I-48 =

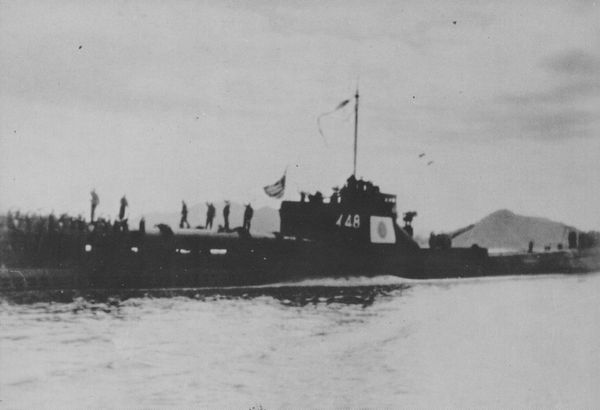
- I-48 at Otsujima Naval Base on 9 January 1945.

History

Empire of Japan
- Name: Submarine No. 378
- Builder: Sasebo Naval Arsenal, Sasebo, Japan
- Laid down: 19 June 1943
- Launched: 12 December 1943
- Renamed: I-48 on 12 December 1943
- Completed: 5 September 1944
- Commissioned: 5 September 1944
- Fate: Sunk 23 January 1945
- Stricken: 10 May 1945

General characteristics
- Class & type: Type C submarine
- Displacement: 2,595 tonnes (2,554 long tons) surfaced; 3,621 tonnes (3,564 long tons) submerged
- Length: 109.3 m (358 ft 7 in) overall
- Beam: 9.1 m (29 ft 10 in)
- Draft: 5.35 m (17 ft 7 in)
- Installed power: 12,400 bhp (9,200 kW) (diesel); 2,000 hp (1,500 kW) (electric motor)
- Propulsion: Diesel-electric; 1 × diesel engine, 751 tons fuel; 1 × electric motor
- Speed: 23.5 knots (43.5 km/h; 27.0 mph) surfaced; 8 knots (15 km/h; 9.2 mph) submerged
- Range: 14,000 nmi (26,000 km; 16,000 mi) at 16 knots (30 km/h; 18 mph) surfaced; 60 nmi (110 km; 69 mi) at 3 knots (5.6 km/h; 3.5 mph) submerged
- Test depth: 100 m (330 ft)
- Crew: 94
- Armament: 8 × bow 533 mm (21 in) torpedo tubes; 1 × 14 cm (5.5 in) deck gun; 2 × single or twin 25 mm (1 in) Type 96 anti-aircraft guns

I-48 (伊48) was the eighth Type C cruiser submarines built for the Imperial Japanese Navy. Commissioned in September 1944, she operated as a kaiten manned suicide attack torpedo carrier during World War II and was sunk in January 1945. It is sometimes considered as part of a sub-class the Type C due to the various designs variations of the latter batch.

== Design and description ==
The Type C submarines were derived from the earlier Kaidai-type VI with a heavier torpedo armament for long-range attacks. They displaced 2,595 tonnes (2,554 long tons) surfaced and 3,618 tonnes (3,561 long tons) submerged. The submarines were 109.3 meters (358 ft 7 in) long, had a beam of 9.1 meters (29 ft 10 in) and a draft of 5.3 meters (17 ft 5 in). They had a diving depth of 100 meters (330 ft).

For surface running, the boats were powered by two 6,200-brake-horsepower (4,623 kW) diesel engines, each driving one propeller shaft. When submerged each propeller was driven by a 1,000-horsepower (746 kW) electric motor. They could reach 23.6 knots (43.7 km/h; 27.2 mph) on the surface and 8 knots (15 km/h; 9.2 mph) underwater. On the surface, the C1s had a range of 14,000 nautical miles (26,000 km; 16,000 mi) at 16 knots (30 km/h; 18 mph); submerged, they had a range of 60 nmi (110 km; 69 mi) at 3 knots (5.6 km/h; 3.5 mph).

The boats were armed with eight internal bow 53.3 cm (21.0 in) torpedo tubes and carried a total of 20 torpedoes. They were also armed with a single 140 mm (5.5 in)/40 deck gun and two single or twin mounts for 25 mm (1 in) Type 96 anti-aircraft guns. They were equipped to carry one Type A midget submarine aft of the conning tower.

== Construction and commissioning ==
Ordered under the Rapid Naval Armaments Supplement Programme and built by the Sasebo Naval Arsenal at Sasebo, Japan, I-48 was laid down on 19 June 1943 with the name Submarine No. 378. On 12 December 1943, she was numbered I-48 and Launched. She was completed and commissioned on 5 September 1944.

== Service history ==
=== September 1944–January 1945 ===
Upon commissioning, I-48 was attached to the Yokosuka Naval District and assigned to Submarine Squadron 11 in the 6th Fleet. She was configured to carry four kaiten manned suicide attack torpedoes on her after deck, two of them with access tubes that allowed their pilots to enter them while she was submerged. On 7 December 1944, she was reassigned to Submarine Division 15 in the 6th Fleet, and on 8 December she was assigned to the Kongo ("Steel") kaiten unit.

I-48 completed work-ups in the Seto Inland Sea on 26 December 1944 and proceeded to the naval base at Otsujima. She embarked her kaitens and their pilots there, and on 9 January 1945, became the last submarine of the Kongo unit to get underway for the U.S. naval base at Ulithi Atoll in the Caroline Islands to participate in a kaiten attack on the U.S. fleet there scheduled for 21 January 1945. The Japanese never heard from her again.

=== Loss ===
On 21 January 1945, I-48 was 18 nautical miles (33 km; 21 mi) west of Ulithi Atoll proceeding toward the atoll on the surface at 18 knots (33 km/h; 21 mph) when a Tinian-based PBM Mariner flying boat of U.S. Navy Patrol Bombing Squadron 20 (VPB-20) spotted her on radar at 19:30. When the plane tried to ascertain I-48′s nationality, she submerged, and the Mariner attacked her with two depth charges and a Mark 24 "Fido" acoustic homing torpedo. She survived, but aborted her kaiten attack on the anchorage.

After the Mariner′s crew reported the sighting, a hunter-killer group of three destroyer escorts — USS Corbesier (DE-438), USS Conklin (DE-439), and USS Raby (DE-698), with Conklin serving as flagship — from U.S. Navy Escort Division 65 began a search for I-48. The hunter-killer group′s commander made the assumption that I-48 was damaged and would head for Japanese-held Yap at an average submerged speed of 3 knots (5.6 km/h; 3.5 mph). After the group made no contact with I-48, the group expanded its search all the way to Yap on 22 January 1945.

At 03:10 on 23 January 1945, I-48 was on the surface 15 nautical miles (28 km; 17 mi) northeast of Yap, proceeding southwest at 18 knots (33 km/h; 21 mph) when Corbesier detected her on radar at a range of 9,800 yards (9,000 m). Corbesier closed the range and I-48 submerged. Corbesier picked up sonar contact on I-48 at 03:36 and fired a Hedgehog salvo that missed. Conklin and Raby also arrived on the scene. Corbesier fired five more Hedgehog salvoes without scoring any hits, then lost contact.

Corbesier regained contact on I-48 at 09:02 and fired another Hedgehog salvo, which missed. Corbesier again gained sound contact at 09:12, but lost it before she could attack again. Conklin, however, was able to launch a Hedgehog attack at 09:34 from a range of 550 yards (500 m). Seventeen seconds later, she heard four or five explosions at an estimated depth of 175 feet (53 m), followed at 09:36 by a violent explosion that knocked out Conklin′s engines and steering gear. Conklin observed huge air bubbles rising to the surface, soon followed by oil, wreckage, and large quantities of human remains. It marked the end of I-48, sunk with the loss of all 122 men aboard — her crew of 118 and four embarked kaiten pilots — at either 09°55′00″N 138°17′30″E or 09°45′N 138°20′E, according to different sources. A motor whaleboat from Conklin later recovered pieces of planking, splintered wood, cork, interior woodwork with varnished surfaces, a sleeve of a knitted blue sweater containing human flesh, chopsticks, and a seaman's manual from the water 17 nautical miles (31 km; 20 mi) north of Yap.

The Japanese 6th Fleet attempted to contact I-48 on 31 January 1945, ordering her to proceed to Kure, Japan. She did not acknowledge the order. She was stricken from the Navy list on 10 May 1945.
