= Lone Soldier (video game) =

1996 video game

- Developer(s): Tempest Software
- Publisher(s): Telstar Electronic Studios
- Producer(s): Gary Bracey
- Designer(s): Geoff Wilson; Russ Daff; Karl Riley; Jason Backhouse
- Composer(s): Paul Simmons
- Platform(s): PlayStation
- Release: EU: January 1996; JP: October 4, 1996
- Genre(s): Third-person shooter
- Mode(s): Single-player

Lone Soldier is a third-person shooter video game developed by British studio Tempest Software for the PlayStation. The game was released in January 1996 in Europe and on 4 October 1996 in Japan. The game features a single playable main character, a lone soldier armed with various weapons, with the goal of killing enemy forces to progress, eventually defeating terrorist leaders and an intergalactic alien army. The game has a third person view, with the player battling through traditional war settings such as jungle, canyon and city, and also a more futuristic space environment.

== Plot ==
The plot is relatively straight forward, featuring a lone soldier named Hank who has been tasked with taking down terrorist leaders and an intergalactic alien force known as "Varinians" who have stolen an experimental nuclear weapon. Hank must fight through enemy forces and bosses until finally reaching the alien's spaceship to defeat the alien leader Titus.

== Gameplay ==
Screenshot showing gameplay, the level time limit and air supply drop.

Lone Soldier is a 3D polygonal third-person shooter video game that puts the player in control of a lone soldier, battling enemy forces and various hazards. The player proceeds forwards through levels, with a fixed camera view and an on screen reticle for aiming weapons. The game features a semi-destructible environment, with the player being able to destroy guard towers, enemy tents and set trees on fire, which can damage enemies in the area. Weapon pickups are available throughout, allowing the player to use grenades, machine guns, bazookas, shotguns and flamethrowers. Each level has a time limit displayed in the lower right corner of the screen.

The game is made up of four environments or worlds, each with differing enemies and obstacles. The jungle environment contains five levels including the boss level. Enemies consist of soldiers/grunts, and members of native tribes. Soldiers are armed with standard military weaponry and the tribesmen wield spears and poison darts. Other hazards include river boats, possessed statues and guard towers. The jungle boss raises tribesmen from the dead to battle alongside him. Once the boss is sufficiently damaged he transforms into a Werewolf with stagnant breath and club attacks. The canyon environment contains four levels including the boss level. Additional hazards include a helicopter, tanks and military trucks. The canyon boss is a soldier that emerges from the helicopter seen in the previous levels of the canyon. The city environment contains four levels including the boss level. Additional enemies include armed mutants. The boss is the "fat lady" armed with a machine gun and supported by her male companion. The alien spaceship environment contains five levels and features several unique enemy types including alien turrets, alien robots, hovering droids and alien soldiers. Before facing the final boss of the game, the player must defeat his female guardian. Once complete, the player can fight the alien leader Titus in his throne room. Once Titus's health is depleted by half he transforms into huge metallic machine.

== Development ==
Screenshot from the German release showing the human main character replaced with a cyborg.

During development an alpha release was given to certain video game magazines to preview the game before the official release. The preview disc contained 3 rocky levels, early incarnations of the eventual Canyon levels.

An altered version of the game was released in Germany, replacing the human main character with a robot/cyborg. The game's box art was also amended to reflect the changes made in-game.

== Reception ==
Reception

Review scores
Publication	Score
Famitsu	19/40
Play	92%
MAN!AC	55/100

At the time, the reception was mixed with Play Magazine giving it 92% and PSX-Pro Magazine giving it a 5.5/10.

Retrospectively the game was noted as one of the "Top Ten horrifically bad video games" by the website Videogamer.com, with them stating that it prioritised graphics over gameplay.
