= Zillah Byng-Thorne =

British businesswoman (born 1974)

- Born: Zillah Byng-Maddick; 1974 (age 51–52); Cumbernauld, Scotland
- Education: University of Glasgow; Henley Business School
- Board member of: Betfair, Future plc, Mecom, Trustpilot
- Spouse: Max Thorne
- Children: 5

Zillah Byng-Thorne (née Byng-Maddick, born November 1974) is a British businesswoman, and chief executive of Dignity Funerals. She is the former CEO of Future plc, an FTSE 250 British media company, since April 2014. She was described by The Guardian in September 2022 as "one of the UK’s most successful media executives."

== Early life ==
She was born in Cumbernauld in 1974, grew up near Glasgow, and earned a MA in management from University of Glasgow and a MSc in behavioural change from Henley Business School. She is a chartered management accountant and qualified treasurer.

== Career ==
Byng-Thorne qualified as an accountant with Nestlé UK. She later had senior finance roles with GE Capital and HMV, before becoming CFO of Threshers, then finance director of Fitness First.

She was previously CFO of Auto Trader Group.

Byng-Thorne joined Future in November 2013 as a part-time chief financial officer (CFO), and became CEO in April 2014. In 2021, she earned £8.8 million as chief executive, which included a salary of £575,000, a bonus of £1.15 million and £7.03 million through a performance share plan.

She is a non-executive director of Mecom and Betfair. She was the senior independent non-executive director of online retailer THG until stepping down in September 2022, at the same time as she was appointed as deputy chairman of online reviews site Trustpilot.

Zillah Byng-Thorne became CEO of the Dignity Funerals Group in June 2024.

== Personal life ==
She is married to Max Thorne. She has three sons and two stepsons.
