= Free Software Magazine =

Website and magazine about free software

- Editor in Chief: Tony Mobily
- Categories: Internet magazine
- First issue: November 2004; 21 years ago
- Company: The Open Company Partners Inc.
- Country: United States
- Language: English
- Website: www.freesoftwaremagazine.com

Free Software Magazine (also known as FSM and originally titled The Open Voice) is a website that produces (generally bi-monthly) a mostly free-content online magazine about free software.

It was started in November 2004 by Australian Tony Mobily, the former editor of TUX Magazine, under the auspices of The Open Company Partners, Inc. (based in the United States), and carried the subtitle The free magazine for the free software world.

== History ==
FSM was originally conceived by its creator as a magazine to be sold in both print and electronic formats, with a higher signal-to-noise ratio than mass-produced print Linux magazines. Under this model, the articles were freely licensed six weeks after the print edition's publication. As O'Reilly Media's onLAMP.com noted, "several excellent magazines cover Linux, but they’re directed at particular subsets of Linux users and don’t have the broad mandate of Free Software Magazine."

However, the high costs of printing and postage resulted in the magazine moving to exclusively electronic publication via PDF.

=== PDF version history ===
Initially a print-ready, hand-crafted PDF version was available for download. With Issue 16 (February 2007), this was withdrawn, with the publishers citing time and money constraints. As a result, the magazine is no longer available in print copy. This move sparked a harsh response from some members of the community. As a result, from March 2008, PDF and printer friendly version of articles and PDF versions of entire issues were made available to all logged-in users. These PDF files are created automatically using TOXIC⟨⟩ and omit the styling and presentation of the print-ready ones.

== Content ==
FSM devotes most of its context to Linux, the GNU Project and free software in general, including articles about software freedom and how it can be protected. The issues had three main sections:

Power-up
Non-technical articles about various subjects (interviews, opinions, book reviews, etc.)
User space
Articles aimed at end users.
Hacker's code
Technical articles about what can be achieved with free software.

Most of the articles are released under a free license (generally a Creative Commons License or GNU Free Documentation License). Some articles are released under a verbatim-copying-only license.

In keeping with the move to more on-line content, FSM moved to blog-style columns where regular authors write on more political, philosophical and ethical aspects of the free software world, and discuss free software advocacy and community in addition to tutorials and reviews of free software. There is also a community posts section which allows registered users to post similar blog-style pieces. The site also features a regular webcomic "the Bizarre Cathedral".

== Free Software Daily ==
Free Software Daily (FS Daily) was a website originally created by the staff of FSM that posted summaries of articles about free software. At first, it was based on Slash and was similar in nature to Slashdot.org. However, the project died before it could gain momentum, mainly because of the huge hardware resources required by Slash and the time constraints of the FSM staff.

The FSM website's blogs somewhat filled the gap that Free Software Daily originally planned to fill. But later, FS Daily came back, first as a Pligg based site, and then as a Drigg site. Drigg was developed by Free Software Magazine's editor Tony Mobily specifically for FSDaily. However, Drigg is now available as a standard Drupal module.

Although Free Software Magazine and Free Software Daily share similar motives and a common root, they are no longer directly connected.

== Free Software Magazine Press ==
In 2009 Free Software Magazine Press published their first book under the imprint of Free Software Magazine Press. The book, Achieving Impossible Things with Free Culture and Commons-Based Enterprise by Terry Hancock, was published both as a printed book and as a series of free articles released under an "Attribution Share-Alike" Creative Commons license.

== See also ==
- Linux Journal
- Linux Weekly News
- Linux Gazette
