= Linux Format =

UK computer magazine

- Cover of LXF329, the final issue (July 2025)
- Editor: Neil Mohr
- Categories: Linux
- Frequency: 13 per year
- Circulation: 19,000 Jan-Dec 2014
- First issue: 2000; 26 years ago
- Final issue Number: July 2025; 329
- Company: Future plc
- Country: United Kingdom
- Language: English
- Website: linuxformat.com
- ISSN: 1470-4234

Linux Format was the UK's first Linux-specific magazine, and as of 2013 was the best-selling Linux title in the UK. It was also exported to many countries worldwide. It was published by Future plc (which produces a number of other computer magazines). Linux Format was commonly abbreviated to LXF, and issues are referred to with LXF as a prefix followed by the issue number (for example, LXF102 referred to the 102nd issue).

It began as a one-issue pilot in 1999 called Linux Answers, and began full publication as Linux Format in May 2000 after being launched and produced by a small team consisting of Editor Nick Veitch, Art Editor Chris Crookes and staff writer Richard Drummond, who together created the magazine's core values and initial design appearance.

Linux Format had translated editions available in Italy, Greece and Russia. Many magazines were exported around the world, principally to the USA where they were sold in Barnes & Noble stores, as well as other large book stores.

Articles within Linux Format regularly featured at-length series and practical tutorials to teach and allowed users to expand their skills in using the Linux operating system and its associated software applications. Contributions were encouraged to be submitted by readers.

Linux Format shared the UK market place with an English-language version of Linux Magazine and formerly with Linux User and Developer which discontinued in September 2018.

The magazine ceased publishing after issue 329, cover dated as July 2025.

== Contents ==
Linux Format included similar content to that found in most computer magazines, but aimed specifically at users of the Linux operating system. There were reviews, round-ups, technology features and tutorials aimed at all levels of users.

The magazine no longer came with a DVD containing full Linux distributions, and other free software.

== Staff ==
The magazine was edited by Neil Mohr with a team composed of Efraín Hernández-Mendoza as Art Editor, Jonni Bidwell as Technical Editor and Chris Thornett as Operations Editor. Previous staff members include Graham Morrison, Andrew Gregory, Mike Saunders and Ben Everard who went on to produce Linux Voice magazine (which later merged with Linux Magazine).

== Frequency ==
The magazine was published 13 times a year.

== Online presence ==
Linux Format had a dedicated magazine website which contains forums for readers to interact with the editorial staff and writers, as well as an extensive reference section for the articles in the magazine. In February 2009, the Linux Format editorial staff launched TuxRadar. TuxRadar had become the primary method of the editorial team getting Linux news on to the Internet, with the Linux Format webpage undergoing some modifications to become more community-focused.

== See also ==
- Linux Journal
- Linux Voice
- Linux User and Developer
- Linux Magazine
