= Specialized System Consultants =

American private media company

- Company type: Private
- Industry: Publishing

Specialized System Consultants (SSC), is a private media company that publishes magazines and reference manuals. SSC properties have at various times included LinuxGazette.com, ITgarage.com, the monthly international print magazine Linux Journal, and the webzine Tux Magazine.

== Controversy ==
In 1996, the Linux magazine, Linux Gazette, which was at the time managed by creator John M. Fisk, was transferred to SSC (under Phil Hughes) on the understanding that the publication would continue to be open, free and non-commercial. Due to conflicts between SSC and Linux Gazette staff members, the magazine split into two competing groups which still remain separated.
