= Tux Magazine =

American Linux magazine

- Front cover of issue #20
- Categories: Linux magazine
- Frequency: Monthly
- Publisher: SSC Media
- Founded: 2004
- First issue: February 1, 2005; 21 years ago
- Final issue Number: December 2006; 20
- Country: United States
- Based in: Seattle, Washington
- Language: English
- Website: www.tuxmagazine.com

Tux Magazine was an American Linux magazine aimed at Linux desktop end users, specifically those who use the KDE desktop environment. The mission of the magazine was to help Linux take over the desktop market. It was headquartered in Seattle, Washington.

== History and profile ==
Tux was not a print magazine: each issue was delivered digitally as a PDF file. The magazine was established in 2004. The first issue was published on February 1, 2005 and further 19 issues followed almost every month. On January 1, 2007, the publisher announced that the December 2006 issue was the last for the moment, because financial and other issues required a re-evaluation of how to best serve the reader community. All issues are still obtainable from the Tux Magazine website.

== The layout ==
All 20 issues were laid out in a style usual for glossy printed magazines but optimized for screen reading. The magazine fits perfectly on displays in the 4:3 landscape format and the files open automatically in a full-screen presentation. The number of pages per issue is between 46 and 60 with almost no advertising; the files sizes range from 1.8 MB to 14 MB with an average of about 4 MB.

== The contents ==
TUX Magazine contained HOWTO-type articles which helped new Linux users to use their Linux system in their everyday life. The magazine also had reviews of Open Source distributions and software/hardware products aimed at end users. In this, TUX was different from many other Linux Magazines which normally focus on a much more experienced audience.

TUX Magazine elected to focus primarily on the KDE desktop because the publishers regarded KDE as being more comfortable for computer novices and newcomers to Linux. In addition, a survey showed that more newcomers used KDE than GNOME. TUX Magazine was sometimes criticized for focusing on KDE and being critical of GNOME, especially in editorial style columns such as Mango Parfait's. This contained provocative humor which was not well received by GNOME users.

== The publisher ==
TUX was created by SSC Media Corporation, founded in 1983. Other products of SSC Media Corporation include ITGarage.com, LinuxJournal.com, and the international print magazine, Linux Journal (the first magazine about Linux). It is now owned by TUX Media, Ltd.

== Other PDF-based Publications ==
While these magazines share the PDF delivery method, they are not for newcomers to Linux.

- Linux Journal (While primarily a print magazine, it is now available as a PDF as well.)
- Free Software Magazine
- O3 Magazine
