= USS Conklin =

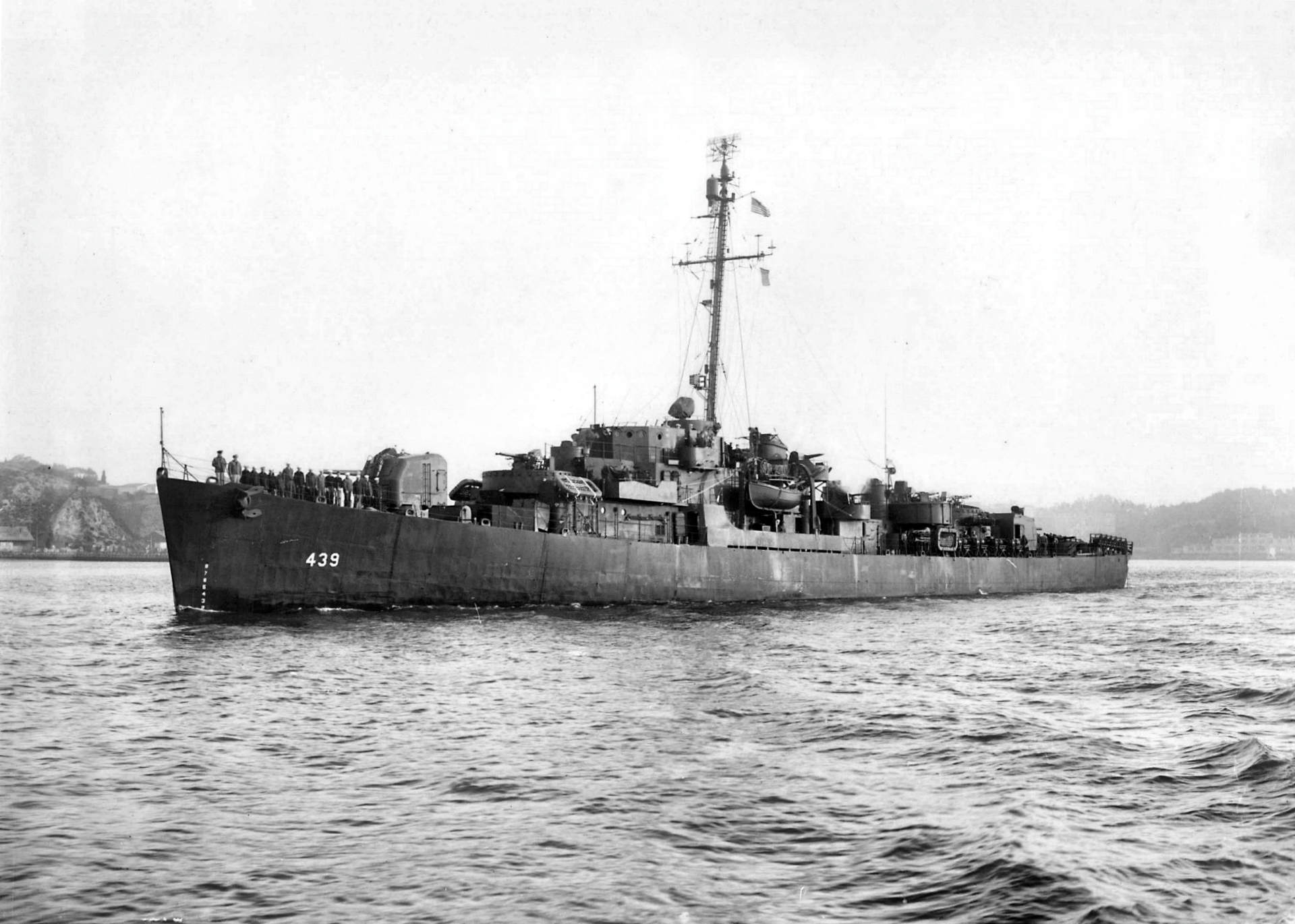
- USS Conklin underway in San Francisco Bay, California on 16 September 1945

History

United States
- Name: Conkllin
- Laid down: 4 November 1943
- Launched: 13 February 1944
- Commissioned: 21 April 1944
- Decommissioned: 17 January 1946
- Stricken: 1 October 1970
- Fate: Sold for scrap, 12 May 1972

General characteristics
- Class & type: John C. Butler-class destroyer escort
- Displacement: 1,350 long tons (1,372 t)
- Length: 306 ft (93 m) (oa)
- Beam: 36 ft 10 in (11.23 m)
- Draft: 13 ft 4 in (4.06 m) (max)
- Propulsion: 2 boilers, 2 geared steam turbines, 12,000 shp (8,900 kW), 2 screws
- Speed: 24 knots (44 km/h; 28 mph)
- Range: 6,000 nmi (11,000 km; 6,900 mi) at 12 knots (22 km/h; 14 mph)
- Complement: 14 officers, 201 enlisted
- Armament: 2 × 5 in (130 mm); 4 × 40 mm AA (2 × 2); 10 × 20 mm guns AA; 3 × 21 in (530 mm) torpedo tubes; 1 × Hedgehog; 8 × K-gun depth charge projectors; 2 × depth charge tracks

USS Conklin (DE-439) was a John C. Butler-class destroyer escort in service with the United States Navy from 1944 to 1946. She was scrapped in 1972. Conklin (DE-439) was named in honor of George Emerson Conklin who was posthumously awarded the Navy Cross for his brave actions on Guadalcanal.

== Namesake ==
George Emerson Conklin was born on 3 January 1921 in Hawley, Pennsylvania. He enlisted in the United States Marine Corps 13 February 1942. Although mortally wounded in action in the Guadalcanal Campaign on 5 October 1942, Conklin remained at his gun until he could no longer man it, then disassembled it and scattered its parts so as to make it useless to the enemy before he died. He was posthumously awarded the Navy Cross.

== History ==
The destroyer escort was launched on 13 February 1944 by the Federal Shipbuilding and Dry Dock Co. at the yard in Newark, New Jersey, sponsored by Mrs. T. Conklin. The vessel was commissioned on 21 April 1944.

Conklin reached Pearl Harbor from the U.S. East Coast 30 July 1944, and after training, sailed to Eniwetok 17 August to convoy the escort carrier USS Kwajalein back to Pearl Harbor. She put to sea again from Pearl Harbor 9 September for convoy escort duty between Kwajalein and Eniwetok until 3 October, when she arrived at Guam to serve as planeguard. After repairs to her sound gear at Eniwetok, she patrolled on anti-submarine duty off Saipan until 6 November, when she cleared for Ulithi and Leyte, guarding a convoy of reinforcement troops and supplies.

Reaching Leyte on 14 November 1944, Conklin cleared the same day to join a hunter-killer group operating off the western entrance to Kossol Passage. Here on 19 November, she and McCoy Reynolds coordinated their depth charge attacks to send the Japanese submarine I-37 to the bottom.

Conklin then returned to escort duty to Eniwetok, Ulithi, and Guam, and on 21 January 1945, joined another hunter-killer group patrolling near Ulithi. On 23 January, she headed a team including Corbesier and Raby in the sinking of another submarine, I-48.

Conklin sailed from Ulithi on 14 February 1945 on escort duty to the Palaus and Manus, where she arrived 27 February to join the screen for the logistics group supporting mighty carrier Task Force TF 58, and from 20 March to 5 June, she was almost constantly at sea with this group for the Okinawa operation. Her duties included transferring passengers, mail, and freight, serving as planeguard, and escorting ships of the group to replenishment at Guam and Ulithi. On 5 June she was heavily damaged in a typhoon off Okinawa, during which one of her men was killed, many injured, and four washed overboard, one rescued by Conklin and one by another ship. During the typhoon in the dark early morning hour of 5AM, at which time a freak wave hit Conklin and rolled her onto her side. The ship rolled more the 72 degrees, and lost all power. By rights the ship should have continued to roll and sink. A freak wave reportedly knocked the ship upright again. She put into Guam for emergency repairs, and on 17 June sailed for a complete overhaul at Mare Island Navy Yard.

With this complete, she sailed to San Diego, California, where she was decommissioned and placed in reserve 17 January 1946. On 1 October 1970 she was struck from the Navy list, and, on 12 May 1972, she was sold for scrapping.

Conklin received three battle stars for World War II service.
