= Birmingham Crematorium =

Crematorium in Perry Barr, Birmingham, England

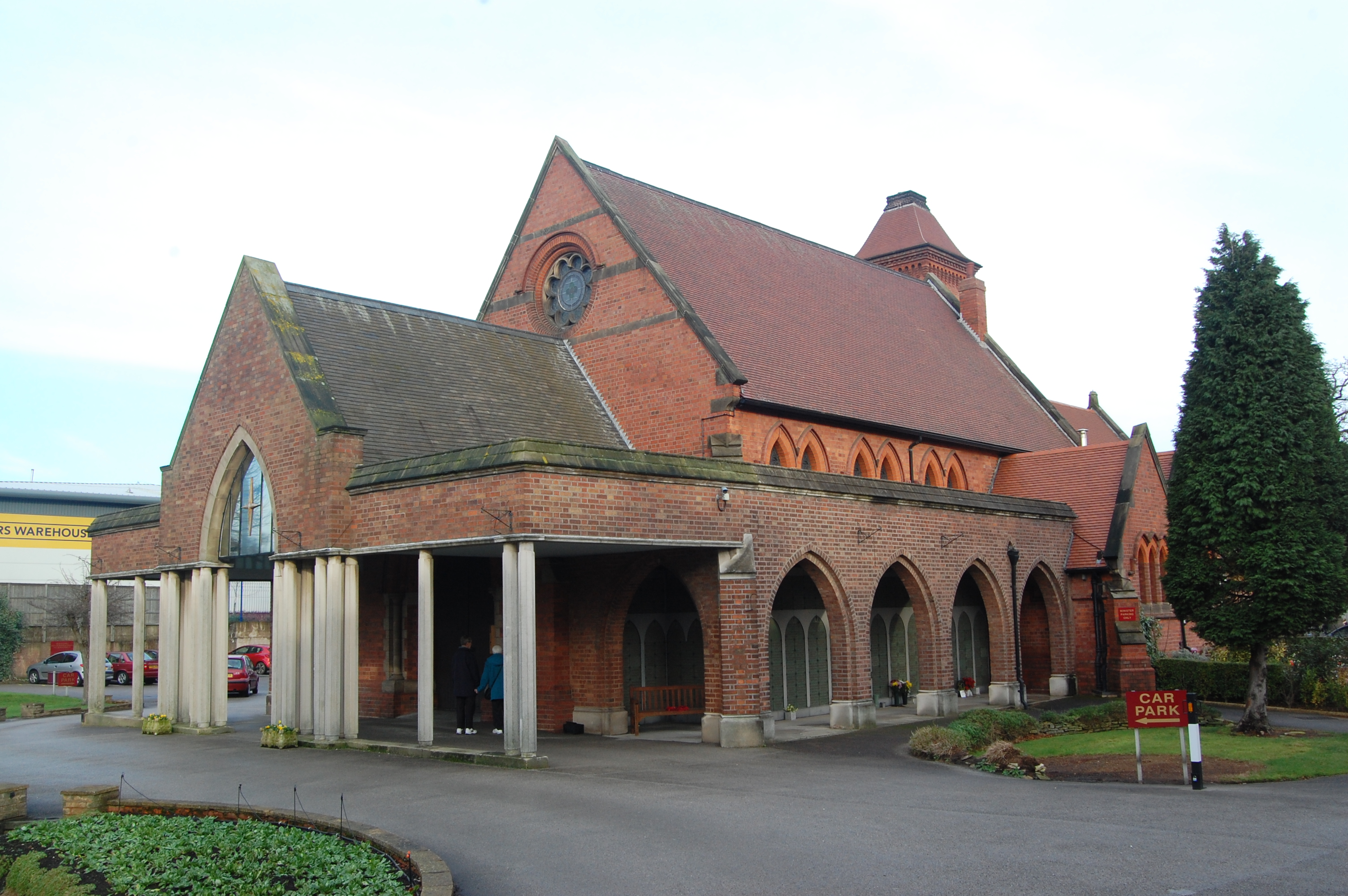
- The main building in December 2013
- Alternative names: Perry Barr Crematorium

General information
- Type: Crematorium
- Location: 389, Walsall Road, Perry Barr, Birmingham, England
- Coordinates: 52.52975°N 1.90880°W
- Opened: October 7, 1903
- Cost: £7,000
- Owner: Dignity plc

Design and construction
- Architect: Frank Osborne

Birmingham Crematorium (sometimes referred to in its early years as Birmingham and District Crematorium) is a crematorium in the Perry Barr district of Birmingham, England, designed by Frank Osborne and opened in 1903. A columbarium was added in 1928. The crematorium is now owned and operated by Dignity plc.

== Background ==
Cremation was not declared legal in Great Britain until 1885, by precedent from the trial of William Price. Despite the opening of Woking Crematorium in 1878 and the passing of the Cremation Act 1902, which came into effect on 1 April 1903, it remained controversial, on religious grounds, in the first decade of the twentieth century. However, proposals to build a crematorium for the city of Birmingham, the ninth such facility in the United Kingdom, received support from Sir Oliver Lodge, Principal of the University of Birmingham, and were given the approval of the three local bishops: Edmund Knox (Coventry), Augustus Legge (Lichfield) and Charles Gore (Worcester) (Birmingham did not have its own bishop until 1905).

== Opening ==
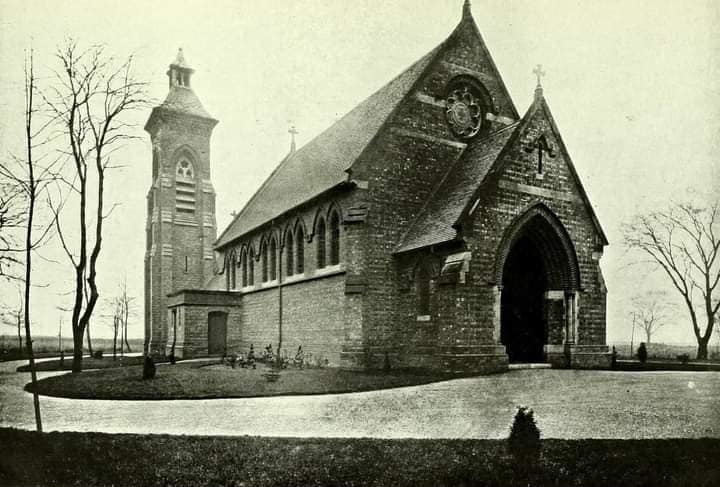
The crematorium around the time of its opening, with its original porch, crosses on roof apexes, and finial on chimney

For 18 months the company established for the purpose tried to find a site for a crematorium for Birmingham, but were refused multiple locations due to public opposition. Eventually, in May 1901 they purchased a site then known as Sheldon Coppice, 3½ miles from the centre of Birmingham, alongside what was later known as the A34 (Walsall Road), in Perry Barr, Staffordshire, (Note: Perry Barr was incorporated into the city of Birmingham in 1928.) from Somerset Gough-Calthorpe, whose family seat, Perry Hall, lies nearby.

The new facility was built in brick, with a tiled roof, and a tower containing the chimney, to designs by Frank Osborne, at a cost £7,000. It had furnaces designed by Messrs. Wilcox & Raikes of Birmingham. and the contractors were Messrs. J. Barnsley and Sons, also of Birmingham. A separate lodge house was built inside the entrance gate.

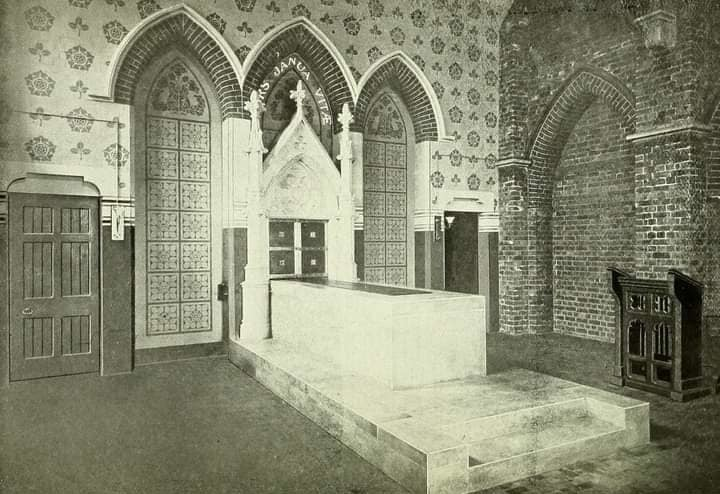
Interior of the crematorium, around the time of its opening

The crematorium was formally opened on 7 October 1903, although it had been used for the first time on the preceding Saturday, 3 October, for the funeral of George Van Wart. (Note: George Van Wart (born 1817) was a son of Henry van Wart and a nephew of Washington Irving.)

In a letter read at the opening ceremony, Bishop Gore wrote:

What I should desire when I myself die is that my body should be reduced rapidly to ashes, so that it may do no harm to the living, and then in accordance with Christian feeling be laid in the earth.

Similarly, Bishop Knox wrote that:

In spite of strong sentimental objections very naturally entertained, we shall come to see that under the conditions of modern life cremation is not only preferable from the sanitary point of view, but that it is also the most reverent and decent treatment of the bodies of the dead.

The ceremony was conducted by Sir Henry Thompson, first president of the Cremation Society of Great Britain. His address, wrote The Lancet:

dealt with the history of the cremation movement from its origin in 1874. He referred to the passing of the general Act last session and to the certain increase of cremation in the future. The proceedings at the opening of the Birmingham Crematorium should go far to impress the minds of any who study them with a sense of the desirability of cremation whether viewed from a religious or from a scientific and sanitary standpoint.

It was his last public duty as the society's president; he died the following year, and was cremated at Golders Green Crematorium.

The current porch replaces a smaller original.

== Early years ==
Initially, the crematorium was under-used, and the company's directors judged that its income was insufficient to make it self-supporting (an eventually which had been foreseen, and budgeted for). In their annual report for the year ending 31 October 1907, the total number of cremations was given as 32. This compared to 3 in the first (short) year, 17 in the year to 31 October 1904, then 20, and 21 for the year to 31 October 1906. By the time of its centenary commemorations in October 2003, 136,000 had been held.

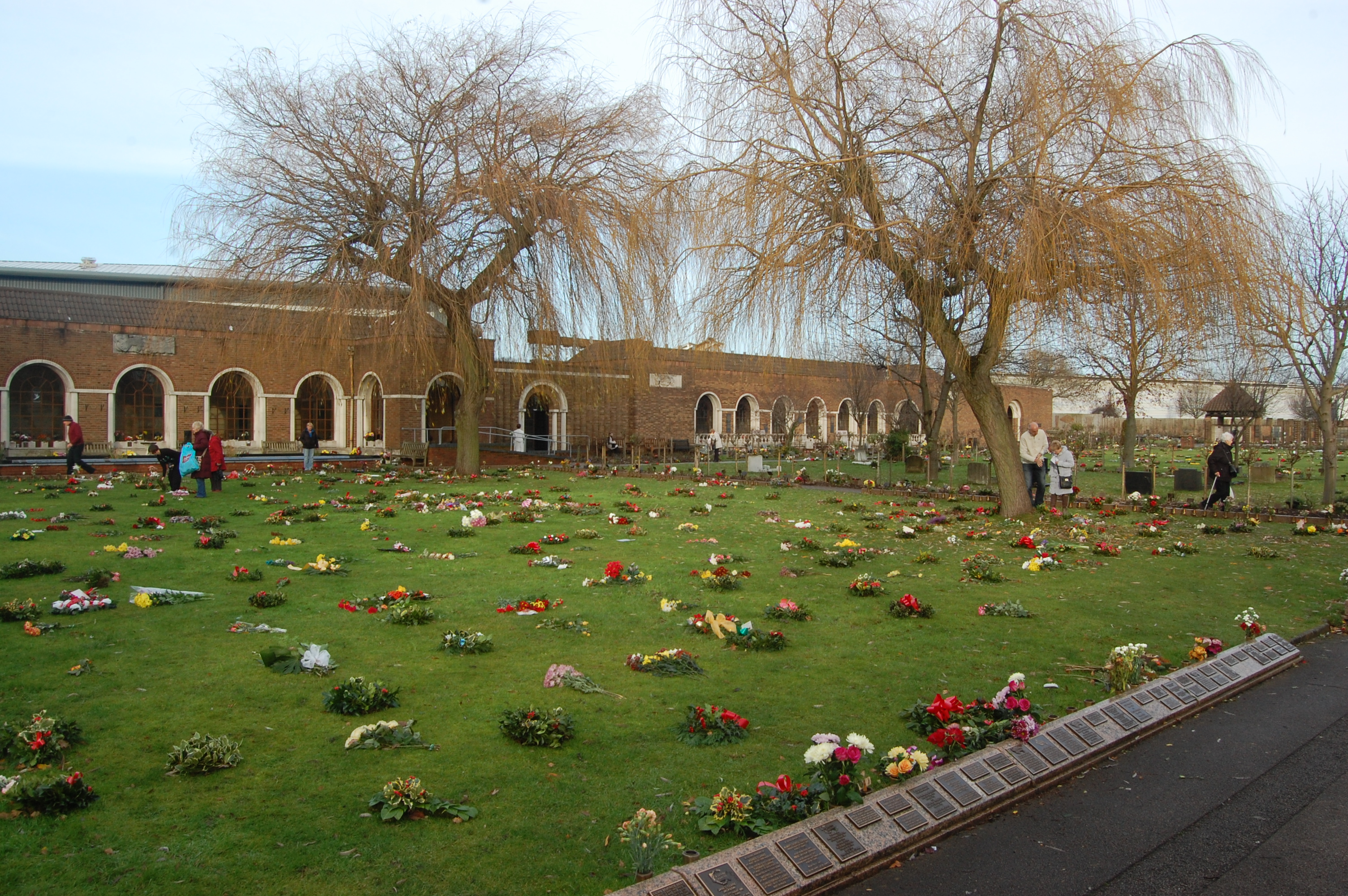
Part of the columbarium, and flowers on the lawn, left in the week before Christmas 2013

A columbarium, detached from the main building, was completed in January 1928.

== Current use ==
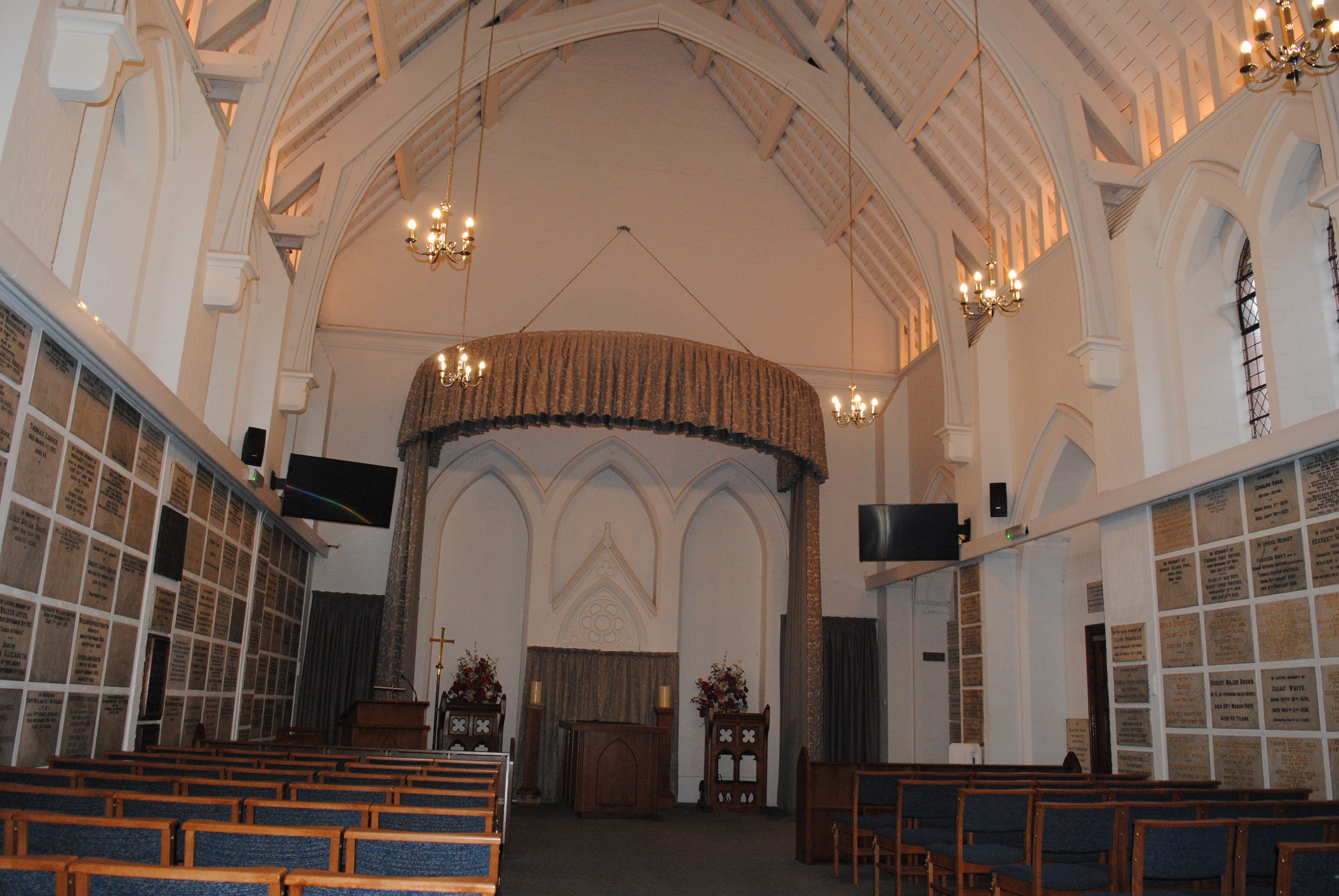
The interior in January 2022, showing the remodelling of 2003, with painted ceiling

The crematorium has been remodelled internally at least twice, the most recent occasion being in 2003. Pews were replaced by chairs, the wooden ceiling was painted, and a gallery over the area where the coffin rests (not present when the crematorium was opened) was removed. Following this, a rededication service as led by the Bishop for Birmingham, John Sentamu.

The gardens host a Commonwealth War Graves Commission memorial commemorating three World War I and 64 World War II servicemen who were cremated at Perry Barr. Headstones mark the sites of the ashes of one of the 64, and a Czech soldier.

The crematorium is now operated by Dignity plc and is still in active use. It can accommodate coffins up to 30 inches (76 cm) wide, 1 inch (2.5 cm) less than other crematoria in the vicinity.

== Notable cremations ==
A number of notable people have been cremated at Perry Barr. They include:

- January 1943: Sir Henry Maybury, civil engineer.
- 29 September 1950: John Beard, former leader of the Workers' Union (ashes scattered at Rowton, Shropshire).
- 14 October 2002: Victor Turton, former Lord Mayor of Birmingham.
