= Henry Maybury =

British civil engineer (1864–1943)

Brigadier-General Sir Henry Maybury GBE KCMG CB
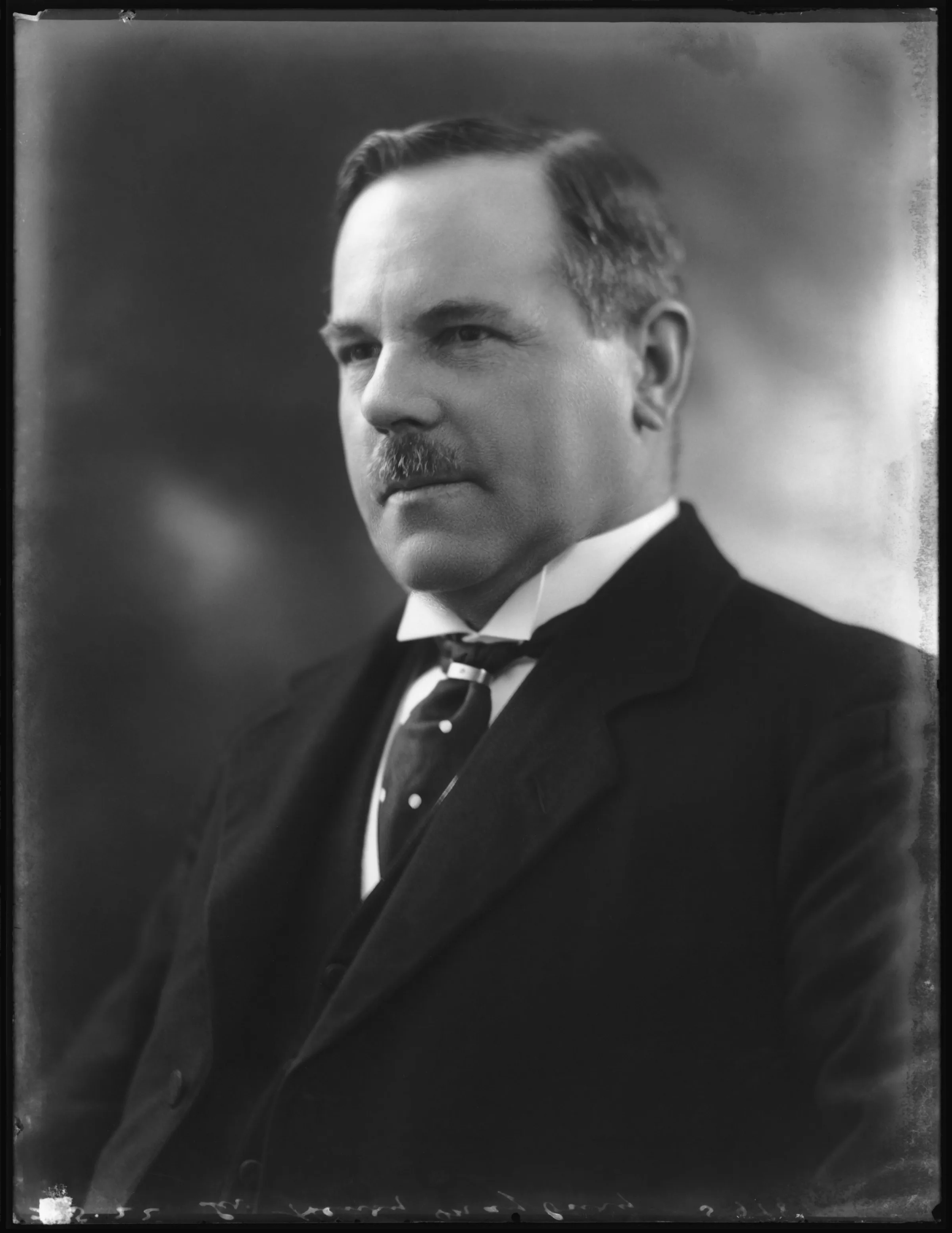
- Maybury in 1922
- Born: 17 November 1864; Uffington, Shropshire, England
- Died: 7 January 1943 (aged 78); Shrewsbury, Shropshire, England
- Occupation: Civil engineer
- Spouses: Elizabeth Sheldon (m. 1885; died 1929) Katharine Mary Pring (m. 1942)
- Children: 3

Sir Henry Percy Maybury GBE KCMG CB (17 November 1864 – 7 January 1943) was a British civil engineer. He began his career as a railway engineer, working on many railways in England and Wales before becoming the county surveyor for Kent. At the start of the First World War he was appointed to supervise roads used by the Allies in France, holding the British Army rank of Brigadier-General. In recognition of his services in this theatre he was appointed a Companion of the Order of the Bath and a Knight Commander of the Order of St Michael and St George by the British government and an officer of the Legion of Honour by the French. After the war he held various civil service positions, mainly within the Ministry of Transport, and was elected president of the Institution of Civil Engineers in 1933.

== Early life ==
Maybury was born in Uffington in Shropshire, fourth son of Charles Maybury, a farmer, and his wife Jane (nee Matthews), and was educated at nearby Upton Magna. Upon finishing his studies Maybury began work at Shrewsbury railway station in the office of RE Johnston, the chief engineer of the Shrewsbury and Hereford Railway, a joint venture between the Great Western and London and North Western railway companies, where he worked for five years.

In 1884 he joined the Wrexham contracting firm of Johnson Brothers and Slay, where he became manager, and worked on the Glyn Valley Tramway during the rebuilding in 1886. From 1892 until 1895 he served as the engineer and surveyor of the Ffestiniog Local Highways Board, followed by a similar appointment to the Malvern Urban District Council. From 1904 until 1913 Maybury served as the county surveyor for Kent during which time he was responsible for constructing new roads and classifying the existing network in light of the rapid increase in motor traffic following the revised speed limits of the Motor Car Act 1903. He carried out experiments on road surfaces at Sidcup to try to improve durability and reduce dust produced by the increased speed of traffic.

In 1904 he also developed sewerage and drinking water schemes for Ludlow County Borough and Worcestershire County Council. In 1910 he was invited to become a member of the Advisory Engineering Committee to the Roads Board, who had been impressed by his road surface trials, and served as their chief engineering officer upon leaving his position in Kent. He later became manager and secretary of the board. One of his innovations was to divide the road network intro three categories on the basis of which road maintenance grants would be distributed and he appointed a large staff of engineers to carry out this categorisation.

== First World War ==
From the start of the First World War he was appointed by the War Office to build and maintain roads at military camps in the United Kingdom. In 1916 he visited France to advise the British Army's Engineer-in-Chief on matters to do with road transportation and was asked to form a highway engineering service in France. This organisation was absorbed into the British Army later that year and Maybury was placed at the head of the Roads Directorate and commissioned as a brigadier general. Maybury had charge of the roads used by the Allied forces in France, under Eric Geddes, director-general of transportation. The directorate was responsible for 40,000 men and 4,000 miles of roads plus associated works such as quarries. Maybury was mentioned in dispatches four times for his work during the war and was appointed a Companion of the Order of the Bath and an Officer of the Legion of Honour in 1917. He retired from the army in 1919.

== Later career and honours ==
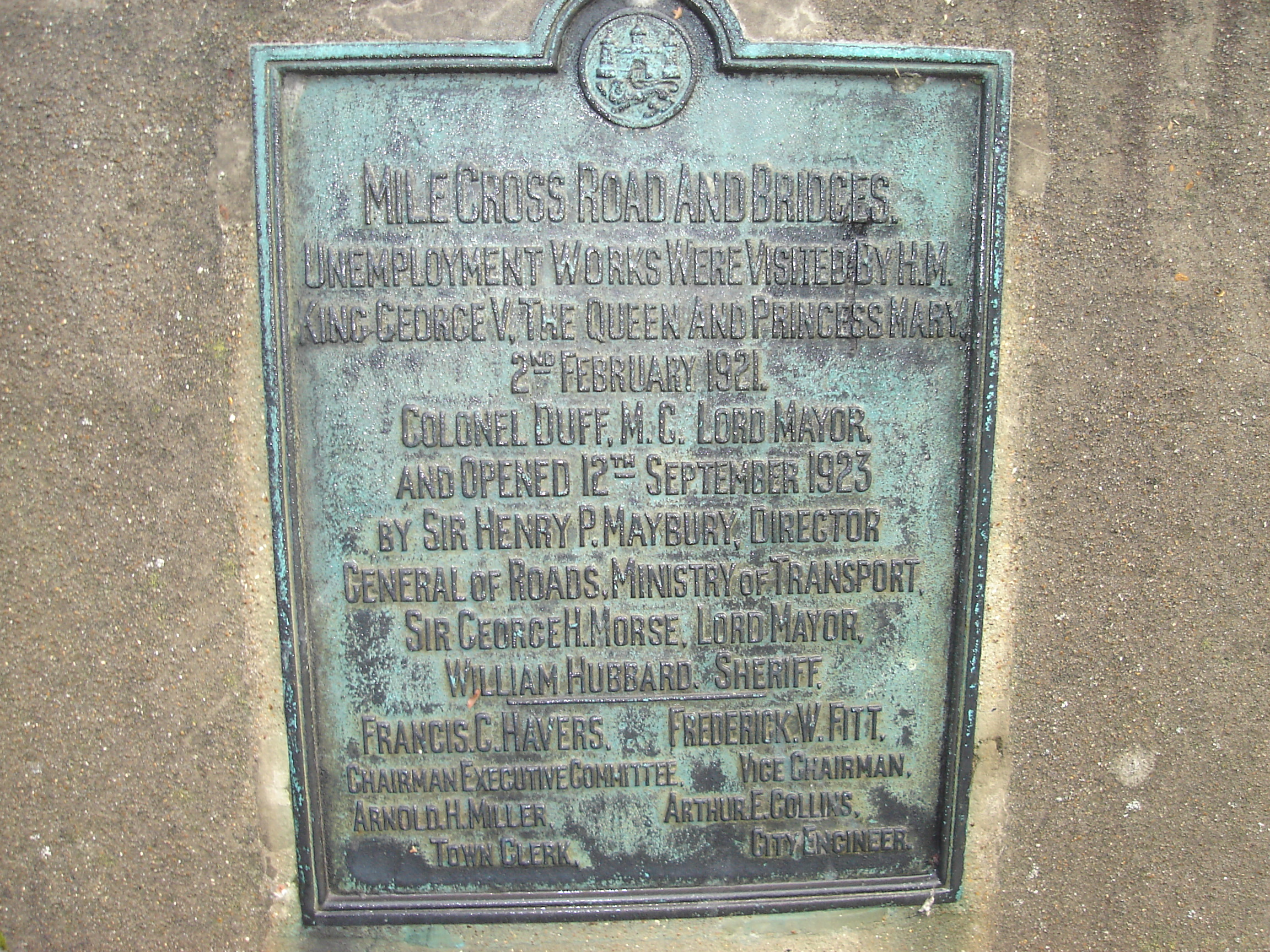
Plaque at Mile Cross bridge, Norwich opened by Maybury in 1921

In 1919 he was created a commander and then knight commander of the Order of St Michael and St George and was appointed Director General of the Roads Department of the Ministry of Transport, a position he would hold for the next nine years. In this role Maybury developed new arterial highways and modernized existing roads, providing a considerable means of employment during a period of depressed economic output.

He served as president of the newly formed Institute of Transport in 1921 and as a Justice of the Peace for Kent in 1922.

Upon retiring from the ministry in 1928 he was made a Knight Grand Cross of the Order of the British Empire (GBE) in the 1928 Birthday Honours and given the freedom of the borough of Shrewsbury. Maybury was elected as president of the Institution of Civil Engineers in 1933, an annual accolade awarded to the profession's most regarded engineers. He had been a member of the institution since 1910 and also served as president of the Institute of Quarrying.

He was appointed to the twelve member London and Home Counties Traffic Advisory Committee when it was formed in 1928 and had responsibility to advise the Minister of Transport on the London Traffic Area. He served as the committee's representative on the London Passenger Transport Board from its formation in 1933 to his death.

Maybury was chairman of the Lights on Vehicles; Taxation and Regulation of Road Vehicles; Licensing and Regulation of Public Service Vehicles and Traffic Signs committees of the Ministry of Transport. In 1936 he chaired the committee for the Development of Civil Aviation in the United Kingdom.

In 1927 he officially opened Maybury Road in Edinburgh, named in his honour, in his capacity as Director General of the Ministry of Transport. In 1928 the Paviors' Company, to which he had been elected in 1918, founded a professorship in highways engineering at the University of London named after himself. For 1936 he was appointed President of the Shropshire Horticultural Society and he had been President of the Shropshire Society in London.

Maybury also held a number of commercial directorships up to his death, including chairmanship of the British Quarrying Company and trustee of the West Midlands Savings Bank. Maybury ran a private engineering consultancy based in Aldwych. He was president of the Smeatonian Society of Civil Engineers at the time of his death.

== Personal life ==
Maybury was twice married. He first married, in 1885, Elizabeth, daughter of Thomas Sheldon of Ludlow, Shropshire. By her he left a son and two daughters. She died in 1929. He married, secondly, in August 1942, when aged 77, his personal secretary, Katharine Mary, daughter of Samuel William Pring of Winchester, Hampshire.

He died, at his home, Four Winds, at Mousecroft Lane, Shrewsbury, on 7 January 1943, aged 78, of asthma and cerebral haemorrhage. He was cremated at Perry Barr Crematorium, Birmingham.

The National Portrait Gallery holds ten portraits of Maybury in its photographical collection.

Professional and academic associations
Preceded by Murdoch Macdonald	President of the Institution of Civil Engineers; November 1933 – November 1934	Succeeded by Richard Redmayne
