= Linux Magazine =

Magazine

- Cover of issue 288 (November 2024)
- Categories: Computing
- Frequency: Monthly
- Founded: 1994; 32 years ago
- Company: Articon GmbH (1994–1996), Linux-Magazin Verlag (1996–), Linux New Media AG (–2012), Medialinx AG (2012–2014), Computec Media GmbH (2014–)
- Country: Germany
- Based in: Munich
- Language: English, German, Polish, Portuguese, Spanish
- Website: linux-magazine.com
- ISSN: 1471-5678

Linux Magazine is an international magazine for Linux software enthusiasts and professionals. It is published by Computec Media GmbH in German-speaking countries and Linux New Media USA, LLC. for English edition.

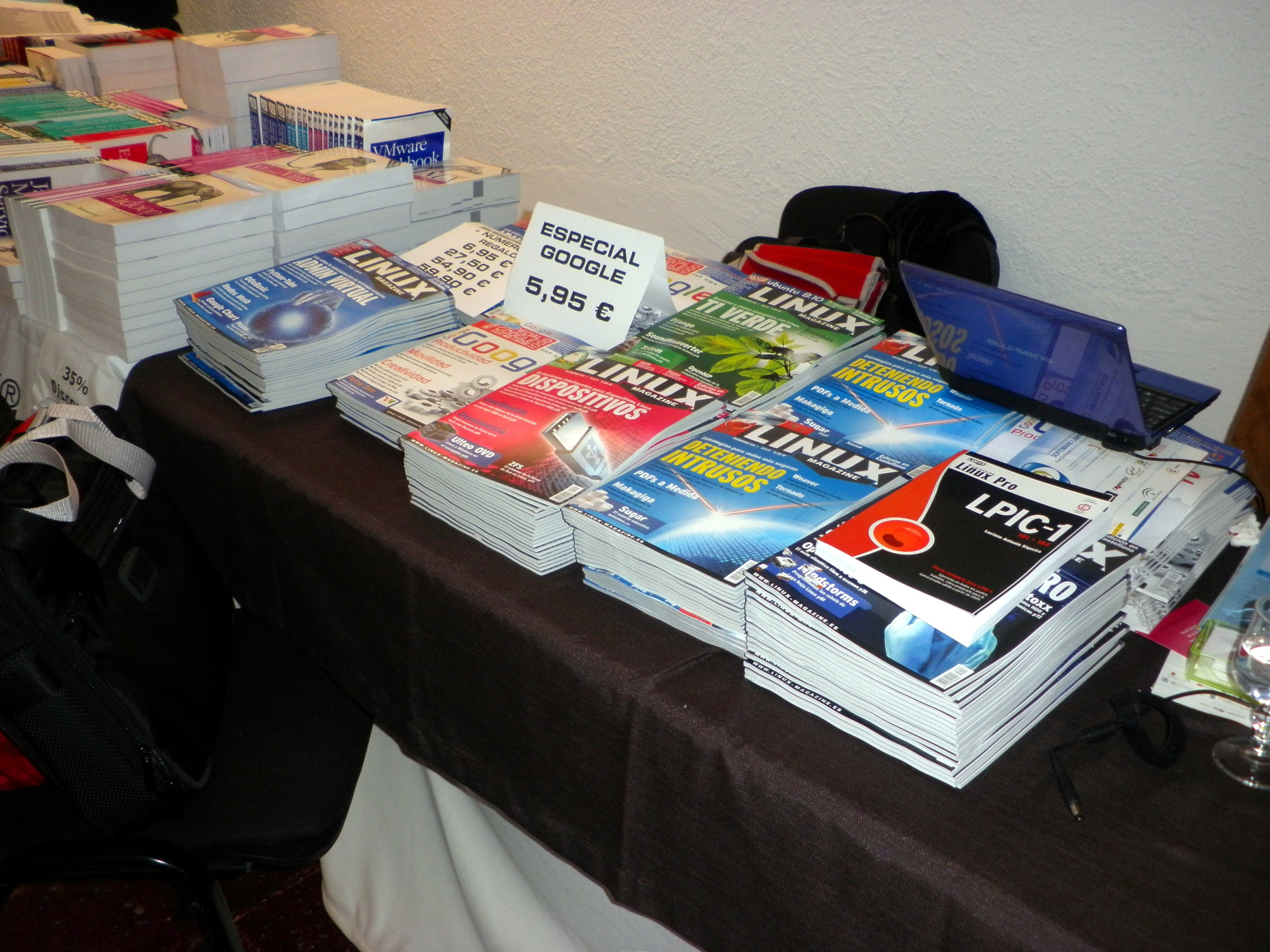
Issues of the Spanish-language edition for sale

The magazine was first published in German in 1994, and later in English, Polish, Brazilian Portuguese, and Spanish. The German edition is called Linux-Magazin (ISSN 1432-640X); the American/Canadian edition was Linux Pro Magazine (ISSN 1752-9050) until January 2023 when the name changed to Linux Magazine. The founding company was Articon GmbH.

The magazine is published on the first Thursday of each month. Every issue includes a DVD-ROM, usually featuring a recent version of a Linux distribution.

== Linux-Magazin ==
Linux-Magazin is among the oldest magazines about Linux in the world. The first German language issue appeared in October 1994, seven months after Linux Journal's first issue, as the information paper for DELUG, the German Linux user group. The slogan of the magazine is „Die Zeitschrift für Linux-Professionals“ (German for "The magazine for Linux professionals").

Medialinx AG along with its titles was acquired by Computec Media in 2014.

== InfoStrada's American-based magazine ==
When Linux New Media launched their North American version of Linux-Magazin, to avoid a naming conflict with another magazine called Linux Magazine published in the United States by InfoStrada, Linux New Media's American and Canadian magazine took the name Linux Pro Magazine.

Linux Magazine (ISSN 1536-4674) was a magazine about Linux written in English and published in the United States by Mountain View, California-based InfoStrada. Their magazine covered system administration, Linux distros, free software, Linux development and other topics.

In June 2008, Linux New Media USA, LLC purchased assets from InfoStrada related to their magazine. Consequently, InfoStrada's Linux Magazine was no longer offering print subscriptions. The website for InfoStrada's Linux Magazine was acquired by QuinStreet's Internet.com network, so no name-change was applied to Linux New Media's North American magazine. The latest article on QuinStreet's site is dated 30 June 2011.

In October 2016, Linux Voice merged as a special section into Linux Magazine.

== See also ==
- Linux Format
- Linux Journal
- Linux Voice
