= Walter Raby =

English footballer

Personal information
- Full name: Walter Leslie Raby
- Date of birth: 23 September 1902
- Place of birth: Lincoln, England
- Date of death: 9 March 1973 (aged 70)
- Height: 5 ft 8 1/2 in (1.74 m)
- Position: Inside forward

Senior career*
Years	Team	Apps	(Gls)
1919–1920	Robeys		
1920	Lincoln City		
1920–1921	Grantham		
1921–1922	Grimsby Town	2	(1)
1922–1923	Clapton Orient	0	(0)
1923–1924	Scunthorpe & Lindsey United		
1924–1925	Gainsborough Trinity		
1925–1926	Poole		
1926–1927	Doncaster Rovers	0	(0)
- * Club domestic league appearances and goals

Walter Leslie Raby (23 September 1902 – 9 March 1973) was an English professional footballer who played as an inside forward.
