= USS Raby =

Buckley-class destroyer escort

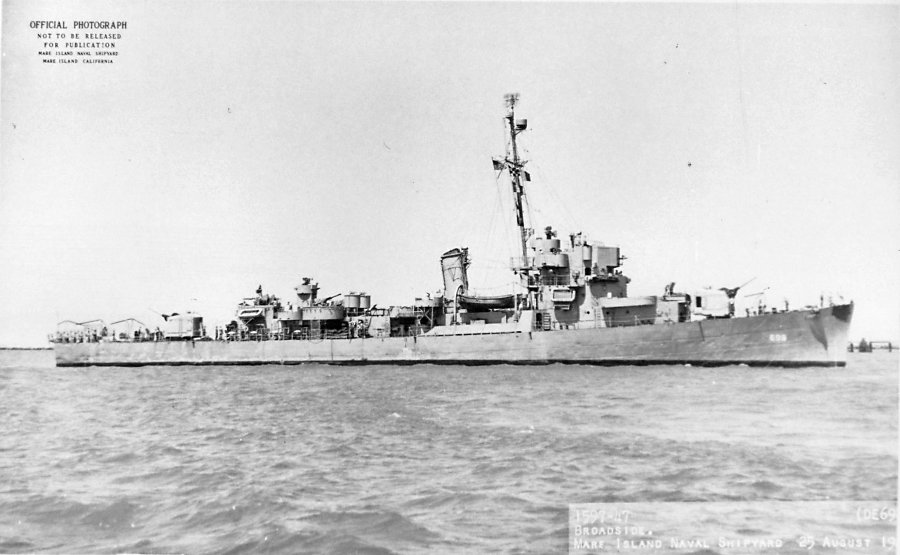

History

United States
- Name: USS Raby
- Namesake: James J. Raby
- Ordered: 1942
- Builder: Defoe Shipbuilding Company, Bay City, Michigan
- Laid down: 7 June 1943
- Launched: 4 September 1943
- Commissioned: 7 December 1943
- Decommissioned: 22 December 1953
- Reclassified: DEC-698, 2 November 1949; DE-698, 27 December 1957
- Stricken: 1 June 1968
- Honors and awards: 3 battle stars (World War II)
- Fate: Sold for scrap 18 July 1969

General characteristics
- Class & type: Buckley-class destroyer escort
- Displacement: 1,400 long tons (1,422 t) standard; 1,740 long tons (1,768 t) full load
- Length: 306 ft (93 m)
- Beam: 37 ft (11 m)
- Draft: 9 ft 6 in (2.90 m) standard; 11 ft 3 in (3.43 m) full load
- Propulsion: 2 × boilers; General Electric turbo-electric drive; 12,000 shp (8.9 MW); 2 × solid manganese-bronze 3,600 lb (1,600 kg) 3-bladed propellers, 8 ft 6 in (2.59 m) diameter, 7 ft 7 in (2.31 m) pitch; 2 × rudders; 359 tons fuel oil
- Speed: 23 knots (43 km/h; 26 mph)
- Range: 3,700 nmi (6,900 km) at 15 kn (28 km/h; 17 mph); 6,000 nmi (11,000 km) at 12 kn (22 km/h; 14 mph)
- Complement: 15 officers, 198 men
- Armament: 3 × 3"/50 caliber guns; 1 × quad 1.1"/75 caliber gun; 8 × single 20 mm guns; 1 × triple 21-inch (533 mm) torpedo tubes; 1 × Hedgehog anti-submarine mortar; 8 × K-gun depth charge projectors; 2 × depth charge tracks

USS Raby (DE/DEC-698) was a Buckley-class destroyer escort for the United States Navy. She was named for Rear Admiral James Joseph Raby (1874–1934).

Raby was laid down on 7 June 1943 at the Defoe Shipbuilding Company, Bay City, Michigan, Rear Admiral Raby's home town. The ship was named Raby on 22 June 1943, and launched on 4 September 1943, sponsored by Mrs. James Joseph Raby, the Admiral's widow. She was commissioned on 7 December 1943 at New Orleans, Louisiana.

== Service history ==
=== World War II, 1943–1945 ===
After shakedown off Bermuda, Raby sailed from Norfolk, Virginia on 10 February 1944 via the Panama Canal for Nouméa, arriving on 11 March. She then escorted fast convoys from Guadalcanal as far as Manus Island, in the Admiralties.

Raby was engaged in hunter-killer activities in the Solomons during the early spring. On 16 May, she sailed from Florida Island, in the Solomons, in a hunter-killer group with England (DE-635) and George (DE-697) on what was to become one of the most successful anti-submarine actions in the Pacific war. During this patrol from 19 to 31 May, the three-ship team sank six Japanese submarines (I-16, Ro-106, Ro-104, Ro-116, Ro-108, and Ro-105) in waters north of the Bismarck Archipelago.

Raby resumed convoy escort missions at the end of June, remaining in the Solomons until 26 October when she got underway for Manus for similar duty in the Admiralties. In December, she shifted to Ulithi. On the evening of 21 January 1945, a plane spotted a Japanese submarine on the surface 18 miles due west of Ulithi. The alarm brought a hunter killer team composed of DEs Raby, Conklin (DE-439) and Corbesier (DE-438) steaming quickly from Uithi. The three ships conducted an expanding search that lasted all day and night on the 22nd. Early in the morning of the 23rd, radar contact was made. After the submarine submerged, sonar contact was established. Several attempts with hedgehog mortars resulted in the destruction of Japanese submarine I-48. At the end of January, Raby proceeded to Guam where she served as escort and patrol ship into June. Between 22 June and 31 August, she completed two slow tows to Okinawa, and on 13 September, she steamed for Pearl Harbor and the United States.

=== Post-war activities, 1946–1953 ===
Remaining in California waters through the winter, she underwent a conversion where the three-inch guns were replaced by two single 5-inch guns and a hedgehog anti-submarine launcher. She reported to the 7th Fleet for duty in the Far East on 6 April 1946, rescuing the crew of a downed B-29 bomber on the same day. She subsequently was put into Hong Kong, Kiirun, Shanghai, and Tsingtao, reaching Okinawa on 26 June. She operated out of Okinawa, China, and Japan until returning to San Diego on 9 April 1947. She was assigned to Task Force 15 and made two runs from the west coast to Pearl Harbor before getting underway on 7 December for Eniwetok, Kwajalein, and Bikini where she arrived on 1 May 1948. She returned to Pearl Harbor on 27 May and to San Diego on 28 January 1949. She conducted local operations on the west coast, making two trips to Pearl Harbor during the rest of the year.

Reclassified as control escort ship DEC-698 on 2 November 1949, Raby transited the Panama Canal on 25 January 1950, and arrived at Norfolk on 1 February. During the next 3½ years, she operated alternately in the Norfolk area and in the Caribbean.

=== Decommissioning and sale, 1953–1968 ===
She was at the Philadelphia Naval Shipyard, from June to September 1953 for deactivation, and she arrived in the Atlantic Reserve Fleet berthing area at St. James River, Florida, on 24 September. Raby was decommissioned on 22 December 1953. She was re-designated back to DE-698 on 27 December 1957. She was transferred to the Orange, Texas, berthing area in 1960. Raby was struck from the Navy List on 1 June 1968, and subsequently sold for scrap.

== Awards ==
Raby earned three battle stars for World War II service.
