= All About Space =

Popular science magazine (2012–2024)

- Cover of the final issue (issue 161)
- Editor: Gemma Lavender
- Categories: Science
- Frequency: Monthly; Bimonthly (Turkey)
- Publisher: Future plc
- First issue: 28 June 2012
- Final issue: October 2024
- Country: United Kingdom
- Based in: Bournemouth
- Website: www.spaceanswers.com
- ISSN: 2050-0548

All About Space was a monthly popular science magazine, focusing primarily on cosmological events, astronomical tips, and astronautical exploration.

== History and profile ==
All About Space was first published in June 2012. by the British publisher Imagine Publishing. The first issue was published on 28 June 2012. The magazine was taken over by Future Publishing on 21 October 2016.

Dave Harfield was the launching editor-in-chief of All About Space, which has regular features on ongoing space missions, as well as having a "future tech" section that details the capabilities of space exploration under future technology. The magazine can be bought in standard print format, or digitally through Zinio, iTunes or Google Play.

Previous publisher Imagine Publishing said that the demographic of the magazine is 80% male and 20% female. The average age group is 22-45 and the readers are affluent. The publication's longest serving editor was British astronomer and author Gemma Lavender. During her tenure as the magazine's content director, Lavender introduced a virtual reality experience, a redesign, an audio magazine, merchandise and an enhanced editorial direction.

The magazine finished publication with issue number 161 published in October 2024.
