= Total 911 =

Automotive magazine

- Cover of the final issue (249)
- Editor: Lee Sibley
- Photographer: Ali Cusick
- Categories: Automobile
- Frequency: Monthly
- Founder: Rob Mugglestone; Philip Raby; John Francas
- Founded: 2005
- First issue: 2005; 21 years ago
- Final issue Number: October 2024; 1 year ago 249
- Company: Future plc
- Country: United Kingdom
- Language: English

Total 911 was an international magazine devoted to the Porsche 911 sports car, from 1963 to 2024. It was published monthly in the UK by Future plc.

Launched in 2005 by Rob Mugglestone, Philip Raby and John Francas (under 9 Publishing Ltd), Total 911 is a niche publication, covering mainly the 911 model in Porsche's range. The three decided to launch a magazine that had editorial depth and accuracy with the coffee-table design quality of lifestyle magazines.

Total 911 Magazine was sold to Imagine Publishing in 2008, and has continued to grow and develop its reputation in the automotive journalism sector. It is sold through newsagents and subscribers worldwide in nearly 100 countries.

In early 2010, Total 911 was released on the Apple iPhone and iPad – a first for a magazine of its type.

Since 2016, this magazine had been published by Future Publishing. Editor, Lee Sibley, replaced Phil Raby, and ran the magazine until it was eventually closed by Future Publishing in October 2024. Key contributors included journalist "Kyle Fortune", photographer "Ali Cusick" among many others.
