= Henry Raby (politician) =

American legislator

State Legislator
- In office 1872–1876
- Constituency: Natchitoches Parish

Personal details
- Party: Republican
- Profession: Politician

Henry Raby was an American politician, who represented Natchitoches Parish in the Louisiana State House of Representatives from 1872 to 1876. He was documented as being "Colored". He was a Republican. During his time in office, Raby introduced a bill for a poorhouse in the Natchitoches Parish, which was promoted by Senator Blunt in the upper House.
