= Linux Journal =

American technology magazine

- Linux Journal website
- Categories: Computer
- Frequency: Monthly
- First issue: March 1994
- Company: Specialized System Consultants, Inc. Belltown Media, Inc. Slashdot Media LLC. Linux Journal, LLC.
- Country: United States
- Language: English
- Website: linuxjournal.com
- ISSN: 1075-3583

Linux Journal (LJ) is an American monthly technology magazine originally published by Specialized System Consultants, Inc. (SSC) in Seattle, Washington since 1994. In December 2006 the publisher changed to Belltown Media, Inc. in Houston, Texas. Since 2017, the publisher was Linux Journal, LLC. located in Denver, Colorado. The magazine focused specifically on Linux, allowing the content to be a highly specialized source of information for open source enthusiasts. The magazine was published from March 1994 to August 2019, over 25 years, before being bought by Slashdot Media in 2020.

== History ==
Linux Journal was the first magazine to be published about the Linux kernel and operating systems based on it. It was established in 1994. The first issue was published in March 1994 by Phil Hughes and Bob Young, who co-founded Red Hat, and it featured an interview with Linux creator Linus Torvalds.

The publication's last print edition was August 2011, issue 208. Beginning with the September 2011 issue, issue 209, the magazine transitioned to publishing monthly in digital-only formats including various desktop, mobile, and e-pub platforms.

In early July 2014 it was revealed that the NSA's XKeyscore program targeted readers of Linux Journal as part of targeting people interested in the Linux distribution Tails.

On December 1, 2017 Linux Journal announced that it would cease publication due to running out of funds, having fallen into debt and being unable to pay employees for months. However, on January 1, 2018, it announced that it was rescued by Private Internet Access/London Trust Media—which shares similar values—and that the magazine plans to grow: According to editor-in-chief Doc Searls: "Linux Journal should be to Linux what National Geographic is to geography and The New Yorker is to New York—meaning about much more than the title alone suggests."

On August 7, 2019, the Journal announced that it would be shutting down and letting all staff go.

On September 22, 2020, Linux Journal resumed activity under the new management of Slashdot Media.

== See also ==
- Linux Magazine
- Linux Format
- Linux Voice
- Linux Gazette
