= Linux Gazette =

Linux computing webzine

The Linux Gazette
- Website type: Linux, Free and Open Source software
- Available in: English, with several community translations
- Owner: The Editors of the Linux Gazette
- Creator: The Answer Gang
- Editors: Mike Orr; Ben Okopnik
- Website: linuxgazette.net
- Commercial: No, per "Copying License".
- Launched: July 1995
- Current status: Inactive since June 2011; 15 years ago
- ISSN: 1934-371X

The Linux Gazette was a monthly self-published Linux computing webzine, published between July 1995 and June 2011. Its content was published under the Open Publication License.

== History ==
It was started in July 1995 by John M. Fisk as a free service. When a year later in 1996, he went on to pursue his studies and become a medical doctor, Mr. Fisk requested the publication to be sponsored and managed by SSC (Specialized System Consultants, who at that time were also publishers of Linux Journal). The content was always provided by volunteers, including most of the editorial oversight.

After those years, the volunteer staff and the management of SSC had a schism (see Bifurcation below). Both the volunteer-run magazine and the magazine run by SSC has been closed down.

One way Linux Gazette differed from other, similar, webzines (and magazines) was The Answer Gang. In addition to providing a regular page devoted to questions and answers, questions to The Answer Gang were answered on a mailing list, and the subsequent conversations are edited and published as conversations. This started with an arrangement between Marjorie Richardson and Jim Dennis (whom she dubbed "The Answer Guy"). She'd forward questions to him; he'd answer them to the original querent and copy her on the reply; then, she'd gather up all of those, and include them in the monthly help desk column.

Linux Gazette's official motto was "... making Linux just a little more fun".

The last issue (#186) was published in June 2011.

== Bifurcation ==
Fisk transferred the management of the Linux Gazette to SSC (under Phil Hughes) in 1996 in order to pursue medical studies, on the understanding that the publication would continue to be open, free, and non-commercial.

In October 2003, the Linux Gazette split into two competing groups. The staff of LinuxGazette.net, however, said that their decision to start their own version of Linux Gazette was due to several factors: SSC's assertion that Linux Gazette would no longer be edited or released in monthly issues, as well as the removal of material from older issues without notifying the authors.

SSC attempted to assert trademark claims over the publication. LinuxGazette.net contributing editor Rick Moen, however, addressed this claim in an article for LinuxGazette.net:

The very same day it received our notice of the magazine's departure, SSC, Inc. suddenly filed a US $300 fee and trademark application #78319880 with the USA Patent and Trademark Office (USPTO), requesting registration of the name "Linux Gazette" as a service mark. On that form, SSC certified that it had used the mark in commerce starting August 1, 1996. ... SSC's recent legal claim to hegemony over the name "Linux Gazette" strikes us as outrageously unmerited, and cheeky.

Starting May 30, 2004, the US Patent and Trademark Office (USPTO) Trademark Electronic Business Center's TDR (Text Document Retrieval) online record showed a USPTO "Office Action" on application #78319880, summarily refusing registration on grounds that the proposed mark "merely describes the subject matter and nature of the applicant's goods and/or services", and also because publishing a journal is not per se a "service" within the meaning of the term in trademark law (SSC having not provided descriptive evidence or arguments to counter that presumption). The notice gave SSC six months to cure these deficiencies. On Dec. 27, 2004, USPTO's follow-up Notice of Abandonment ruled that "The trademark application below was abandoned because a response to the Office Action mailed on 05-30-2004 was not received within the 6-month response period", adding that any request for reinstatement would have to be received within two additional months. On Jan. 6, 2005, USPTO noted return of its Notice of Abandonment by the post office: "Not deliverable as addressed. Unable to forward."

The magazine run by SSC was closed down, and for an undisclosed reason the volunteer-run magazine was also abandoned. In early 2006, SSC closed the Web site at LinuxGazette.com, and made it an HTTP redirect to the Linux Journal site.
