= Linux Voice =

Software magazine

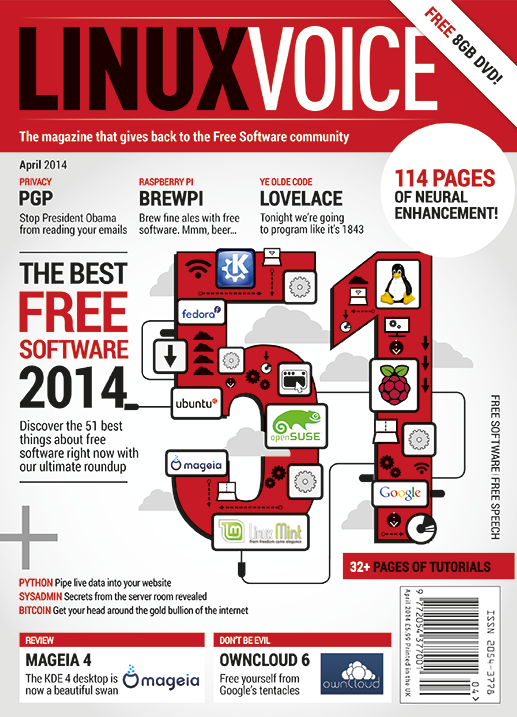
- First issue
- Editor: Graham Morrison
- Categories: Linux
- Frequency: 12 per year
- First issue: 2014
- Final issue: September 2016
- Country: United Kingdom
- Language: English
- Website: www.linuxvoice.com
- ISSN: 2054-3778
- OCLC: 914339325

Linux Voice was a Linux and open source magazine (print and digital) which began publication in the UK in April 2014. It was sold on news-stands around the world.

== History ==
The magazine started as a result of a successful Indiegogo crowdfunding campaign in late 2013, which raised over £120,000. The editorial staff of the magazine came entirely from the UK magazine Linux Format. They resigned to pursue a different agenda in magazine/online publishing. Editorial Director Andrew Gregory claimed the magazine would return a portion of profits to "the community that we serve".

The magazine shared 50% of its yearly profits with reader-voted FOSS projects. The profits were split between 'software' and 'projects and distros' with the top 3 winners in each category receiving a part of the total funds. In 2015 the winners in the software category were Scribus which was awarded £1000, GIMP was awarded £300 and Inkscape was awarded £200. In the projects and distros category, the Open Rights Group was awarded £1000, the Electronic Frontier Foundation was awarded £300 and the Free Software Foundation was awarded £200.

Nine months after an issue was published, it was made available under the Creative Commons Attribution-ShareAlike 3.0 Unported license for all to read without charge in both PDF and ePub formats.

On 27 October 2016 it was announced that Linux Voice was merging with Linux Magazine.

== Podcast ==
In addition to the magazine, the team produced a fortnightly podcast covering Linux and wider free software issues. This continued after the closure of the magazine before ending in November 2017.
