= James J. Raby =

United States Navy admiral

James Joseph Raby
- Born: September 17, 1874; Bay City, Michigan, US
- Died: January 15, 1934 (aged 59); Midway, Georgia, US
- Burial place: Arlington National Cemetery
- Military career
- Allegiance: United States of America
- Branch: United States Navy
- Service years: 1891–1934
- Rank: Rear Admiral
- Commands: Oregon; Albany; Missouri
- Conflicts: World War I
- Awards: Navy Cross

James Joseph Raby (September 17, 1874, Bay City, Michigan – January 15, 1934, Midway, Georgia) was a rear admiral of the United States Navy.

Raby was appointed a midshipman on September 9, 1891. Commissioned as an ensign on July 1, 1895, he advanced rapidly in rank, becoming commander on July 1, 1914, captain on November 23, 1919, and rear admiral on November 1, 1927.

In 1912, he commanded the battleship Oregon (BB-3) with additional duty as Commander of the port of Apra, Guam. During World War I, took out the first merchant convoy under American escort during the war. He received the Navy Cross for convoy escort duty while commanding Albany (CL-23) and later Missouri (BB-11). He held a commission as Air Pilot and often flew his own plane.

After various assignments in Washington, D.C., in 1922 Raby became Commandant of the Naval Air Station Pensacola, Florida, until 1926, and later of the 8th Naval District. In 1931, he became Commandant of the 6th Naval District with additional duty as Commandant of the Charleston Navy Yard, Charleston, South Carolina. In January 1934, he was transferred from command of the Sixth Naval District, to San Francisco, where he was scheduled to assume command of the Twelfth Naval District on 1 February.

He died near Midway, Georgia, approximately 30 miles south Savannah, in a traffic accident on January 15, 1934, when the car in which he was riding turned over in attempting to pass another. He was 59 years old. He is buried at Arlington National Cemetery, Section 6, Site 9629. His wife, Jane Callaghan Raby, sustained major injuries but survived, and died in 1957. She is buried in the same plot as Admiral Raby.

== Namesakes ==
In 1943, the destroyer escort USS Raby (DE-698) was named in his honor.
His son, John Raby, also became a Rear Admiral, and was awarded the Navy Cross in 1942 for action in the occupation of French Morocco. He is buried in the same plot at Arlington National Cemetery as his father. His nephew, Daniel Callaghan, also became a Rear Admiral, and was awarded the Medal of Honor posthumously, for actions in the Naval Battle of Guadalcanal.
