= Philip Raby =

UK motoring journalist (born 1963)

Philip Raby (born 1963) is a former UK motoring journalist who wrote about Porsche. In 2005 he set up his own Porsche magazine, Total 911 which he later sold and it now owned by Future Publishing. He now runs a Porsche sales and service centre in Bosham, West Sussex.

== Work ==
Raby has been fascinated by Porsches – in particular 911s – since he was a young boy. As a motoring journalist, he has researched and written numerous magazine articles on 911s in all their forms, from 1964 to the present day.

Through the course of his work, he has driven most types of 911, from the earliest to the latest models including one from 1965. Among the several he has owned are a couple of 964 series-model 911s.

== Personal life ==
Philip Raby lives with his wife on the south coast of England where he also sails.

== Publications ==
Raby has also produced eBooks and buyers' guides for Porsche enthusiasts.

- Grand Prix Legends, P. Raby, Green Umbrella Publishing, 2007.
- Porsche 911 Identification Guide: All Models Since 1964, P. Raby, Herridge & Sons Ltd, 2006.
- MGF and TF (Ultimate Buyers' Guide) by Philip Raby, 2004.

For juniors (ages 8 to 12) –

- Racing Cars: The Need for Speed, P. Raby, LernerSports, 1999.
- Motorbikes: The Need for Speed, P. Raby and Simon Nix, LernerSports, 1999.

== See also ==
- Porsche
- Porsche 911
- Porsche 964
- Ferdinand Porsche
