= Play (UK magazine) =

British magazine dedicated to the Sony PlayStation

PLAY
- Cover for the final issue (December 2024), featuring Metal Gear Solid Δ: Snake Eater
- Editor: Dave Perry, Nick Roberts, Damian Butt, Luke Albiges, Oscar Taylor-Kent
- Staff writers: Managing Art Editor: Milford Coppock; Operations Editor: Miriam McDonald; Games Editor: Jessica Kinghorn; Contributing Writer: Dashiell Wood
- Categories: Video games
- Frequency: Monthly
- First issue: October 1995 (Original), June 2021 (Revival)
- Final issue: December 2024
- Company: Future Publishing
- Country: United Kingdom
- Based in: Bath
- Website: Official Play website
- ISSN: 2754-0421

Play (stylised as PLAY) was a United Kingdom magazine which reported on Sony's PlayStation product range. It was produced and published monthly consecutively by Paragon Publishing, Imagine Publishing and Future plc. It featured news, reviews, and previews concerning upcoming PlayStation titles. In addition to being sold in the UK, PLAY was also sold in Australia (as PLAY Australia) and as an import in the United States.

== History ==
=== Paragon and Imagine Publishing ===
The magazine was first launched in 1995 by Paragon Publishing (which was later absorbed by Imagine Publishing) and was closed in 2016. Before it closed, the magazine had become the UK's longest-running PlayStation magazine. Issue 269, the magazine's final printed edition was published in April 2016 when it become a digital only publication for a short time. Prior to issue 249, PLAY came with a covermounted DVD every issue.

=== Future plc ===
Future plc acquired Imagine Publishing and its brands in 2016. In May 2021, the PLAY brand was resurrected as a replacement for PlayStation Official Magazine UK. The numbering was reset and the staff were retained from PlayStation Official Magazine UK. The relaunched magazine was part of GamesRadar+. In October 2024, Future announced the magazine would cease publication.
