= Dignity Group =

British funeral services provider

- Industry: Funeral services
- Founded: 1994
- Headquarters: Sutton Coldfield, Birmingham, UK
- Key people: Shirley Garrood, Non-Executive Chair; Zillah Byng-Thorne, CEO
- Revenue: ▼£314.1 million (2021)
- Operating income: ▼£15.9 million (2021)
- Website: www.dignityfunerals.co.uk
- Footnotes / references Dignity plc Annual Report & Accounts 2020

Dignity Group is a funeral-related service provider in the United Kingdom.

== History ==
The business was created in 1994 through the merger of Plantsbrook Group and Great Southern Group, both of which companies had been acquired by Service Corporation International Inc earlier that year. In 2002 the merged business was the subject of a management buyout from Service Corporation International Inc. The merger brought together a number of funeral service businesses.

There are currently 795 Dignity Funeral Directors across the UK. Several mergers and organic growth have brought together a number of historic funeral businesses, private cemeteries and crematoria over the years, including:

- George S Munn, Glasgow – 1812
- Francis Chappell & Sons, London – 1840
- J Rymer, York – 1848
- Ginns & Gutteridge, Leicestershire – 1855
- Lawrence Funeral Service, Halifax – 1857
- E Finch & Sons, Aldershot – 1857
- Beckenham Cemetery, Kent – 1876
- J H Kenyon, London – 1880
- Frederick W Paine, London – 1884
- Perry Barr Crematorium, Birmingham – 1903
- John Bardgett & Son, Newcastle upon Tyne – 1914
- Jonathan Harvey, Glasgow – 1928
- South London Crematorium – 1930
- Seaford & Newhaven Funeral Service, East Sussex – 1950

In January 2023, the board agreed to accept an offer for the company from a consortium of investors including SPWOne V Ltd, Castelnau Group and Phoenix Asset Management.

== Operations ==
Dignity provides funeral services, cremations and pre-arranged funerals UK-wide through three separate brands:

- Dignity Funeral Services
- The Crematorium and Memorial Group
- Simplicity Cremations
