= Antoine Joseph Corbesier =

Lieutenant Antoine Joseph (A.J.) Corbesier (22 January, 1837 – 26 March, 1915) USMC was a Belgian national before becoming Sword Master at the United States Naval Academy at Annapolis, Maryland.

In recognition, two United States Navy destroyer class vessels, the USS Corbesier DE-106 and the USS Corbesier DE-438, were named after him. The name USS Corbesier DE-106 was cancelled 24 September 1943 so it could be used for USS Corbesier DE-438, although both have been decommissioned after the former was transferred to Free France, 2 January 1944 and renamed the Sénégalais (T-22) which took direct damage on 2/3 May 1944, while forcing the German captain to scuttle the German navy submarine U-371 of the Algerian coast, while the latter saw service in World War II and on 23 January, 1945 had a hand in the sinking of a Japanese Imperial Submarine called I-48 near the Caroline Islands of the western Pacific Ocean.

== Military career ==
Lieutenant Corbesier was born on January 22, 1837, in Brussels, Belgium. He was appointed Sword Master of the U.S. Naval Academy at Annapolis, Maryland in October, 1865. He served in that position for forty nine years.

By a Special Act of Congress, he was commissioned as a first lieutenant in the United States Marine Corps on 4 March, 1913.

He is cited by Rear Admiral William F. Fullam as a contributor to Fullam's work, The Petty Officer's Drillbook United States Navy (1904), as well as Fullam’s publication, Ship and Gun-Drills United States Navy (1905).

== Works ==
Principals of Squad Instruction for the Broadsword (1869), examined and recommended by Vice Admiral David Dixon Porter.

Theory of Fencing with the Smallsword Exercise (1873).

== Death ==
On 26 March 1915, he died in the Naval Hospital at Annapolis. He is buried at the United States Naval Academy cemetery.

== Dedications ==
=== USS Corbesier DE-106 ===
USS Corbesier (DE-106), an American Cannon-class destroyer escort, was named in honor of Antoine Joseph Corbesier. It initially was reclassified as the Sénégalais (T-22) sailing with the Free French Naval Forces during World War II, finally it was renamed after Yser, a river that rises on the north of France and enters the Belgian province of West flowing into the North Sea, and reclassified as a frigate (F-702) sailing with the French Navy post-World War II.

The name Corbesier (DE-106) was cancelled 24 September, 1943 and was given to the USS Corbesier (DE-438).

=== USS Corbesier DE-438 ===
USS Corbesier (DE-438) was a John C. Butler-class destroyer escort serving the U.S. Navy during World War II. The vessel was also named in honor of Antoine Joseph Corbesier and was launched 13 February, 1944 by Federal Shipbuilding and Dry Dock Co., Kearny, New Jersey, sponsored by Mrs. G. V. Stewart; and commissioned 31 March 1944, Lieutenant Commander W. B. Porter in command.
