= USS Corbesier (DE-438) =

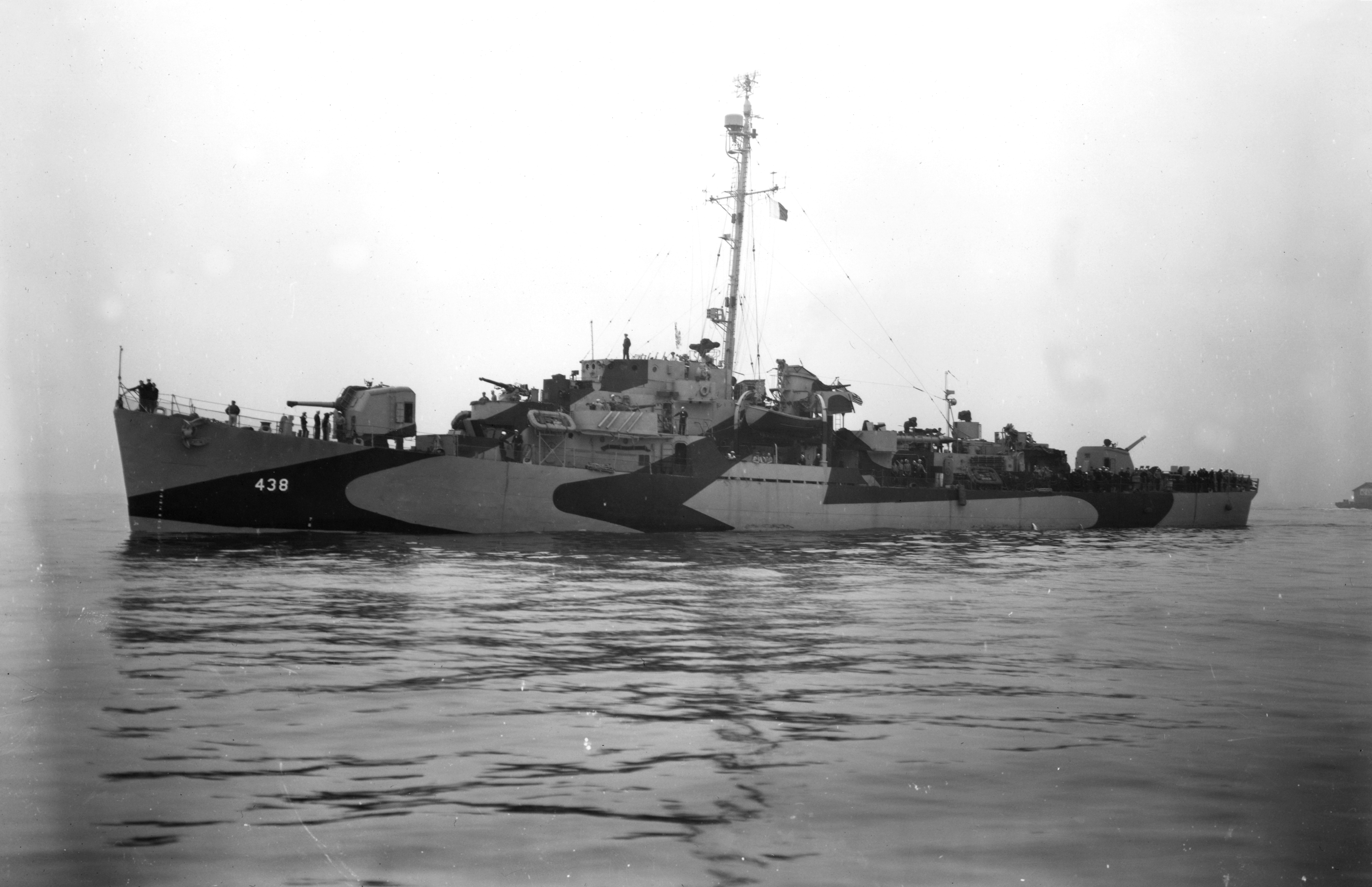
- USS Corbesier on 27 May 1944

History

United States
- Name: Corbesier
- Builder: Federal Shipbuilding and Drydock Company
- Laid down: 4 November 1943
- Launched: 13 February 1944
- Commissioned: 31 March 1944
- Decommissioned: 2 July 1946
- Stricken: 1 December 1972
- Fate: Sold for scrapping 3 December 1973

General characteristics
- Class & type: John C. Butler-class destroyer escort
- Displacement: 1,350 long tons (1,372 t)
- Length: 306 ft (93 m) overall
- Beam: 36 ft 10 in (11.23 m)
- Draft: 13 ft 4 in (4.06 m) maximum
- Propulsion: 2 boilers, 2 geared steam turbines, 12,000 shp (8,900 kW), 2 screws
- Speed: 24 knots (44 km/h; 28 mph)
- Range: 6,000 nmi (11,000 km; 6,900 mi) at 12 knots (22 km/h; 14 mph)
- Complement: 14 officers, 201 enlisted
- Armament: 2 × 5 in (130 mm); 4 × 40 mm AA (2 × 2); 10 × 20 mm guns AA; 3 × 21 in (533 mm) torpedo tubes; 1 × Hedgehog; 8 × K-gun depth charge projectors; 2 × depth charge tracks

USS Corbesier (DE-438) was a John C. Butler-class destroyer escort in service with the United States Navy from 1944 to 1946. She was scrapped in 1973.

== Namesake ==
Corbesier (DE-438) was named in honor of Antoine Joseph Corbesier, born 22 January 1837 in Belgium. He served in the Belgian Army before coming to America. For more than 40 years he was the swordmaster of the U.S. Naval Academy midshipmen. By special Act of Congress, he was given the rank of first lieutenant in the U.S. Marine Corps on 4 March 1913. He died in the Naval Hospital at Annapolis, Maryland on 26 March 1915.

== Construction and career ==
Corbesier (DE-438) was launched on 13 February 1944 by the Federal Shipbuilding and Drydock Company at their yard in Kearny, New Jersey, sponsored by Mrs. G.V. Stewart. The destroyer escort was commissioned on 31 March 1944. Corbesier departed New York City on 29 May 1944 for Pearl Harbor, arriving on 26 June. Between 2 July and 9 August, she twice escorted convoys to Eniwetok and back to Pearl Harbor. She next sailed to escort a cable ship to Midway Island, screened it during its operations there from 29 August to 16 September and proceeded with the cable ship to Eniwetok and Saipan, arriving 2 October.

=== Supporting Philippine operations ===
Corbesier served on patrol and escort off Saipan from 12 October to 11 November 1944, then sailed for Guam and Leyte escorting a U.S. Army engineer dredge. She departed San Pedro Bay 19 November for Ulithi, where from her arrival 25 November she carried out anti-submarine and escort missions, calling at Guam, Saipan, Kossol Roads, and Manus.

=== Sinking of Japanese submarine I-48 ===
On 23 January 1945 with Conklin and Raby she sank the Japanese submarine I-48 (6) off Yap. She sailed from Ulithi on 18 March with the logistics group supporting the fast carrier striking force in the Okinawa Campaign, and screened, guarded planes and transferred passengers, mail, and freight until 15 June, when she was detached at Saipan. Sailing from Saipan 28 June for Okinawa, she operated on anti-submarine screening duty in protection of the operations on the island from 4 July undergoing the hazards of kamikaze attacks, and typhoons.

=== End-of-war assignments ===
At the end of hostilities, she anchored in Buckner Bay until 24 September, when she sailed for Nagasaki, Japan, arriving 25 September for various duties in support of the occupation of Japan, including transportation of passengers, mail, and light freight between Nagasaki, Sasebo, and Okinawa. She cleared Sasebo 15 October for Saipan, Pearl Harbor, and San Diego, California, arriving on 10 November 1945. Corbesier was placed out of commission in reserve 2 July 1946, berthed at San Diego. On 1 December 1972 she was struck from Navy list records, and, on 3 December 1973, she was sold for scrapping.

== Awards ==
Corbesier received two battle stars for World War II service.
