= Future plc =

British publishing company

- Type: Public
- Traded as: LSE: FUTR
- Industry: Magazine and internet publishing
- Predecessor: TI Media
- Founded: 1985; 41 years ago
- Founder: Chris Anderson
- Headquarters: Bath, Somerset, England
- Key people: Richard Huntingford (non-executive chairman); Kevin Li Ying (CEO)
- Revenue: ▼£739.2 million (2025)
- Operating income: ▼£121.9 million (2025)
- Net income: ▼£66.3 million (2025)
- Total assets: ▼£1,633.1 million (2025)
- Total equity: ▼£1,038.8 million (2025)
- Number of employees: 2,991 (2025)
- Subsidiaries: Future Australia; Future Publishing; Future US; Purch Technologies France
- Website: futureplc.com

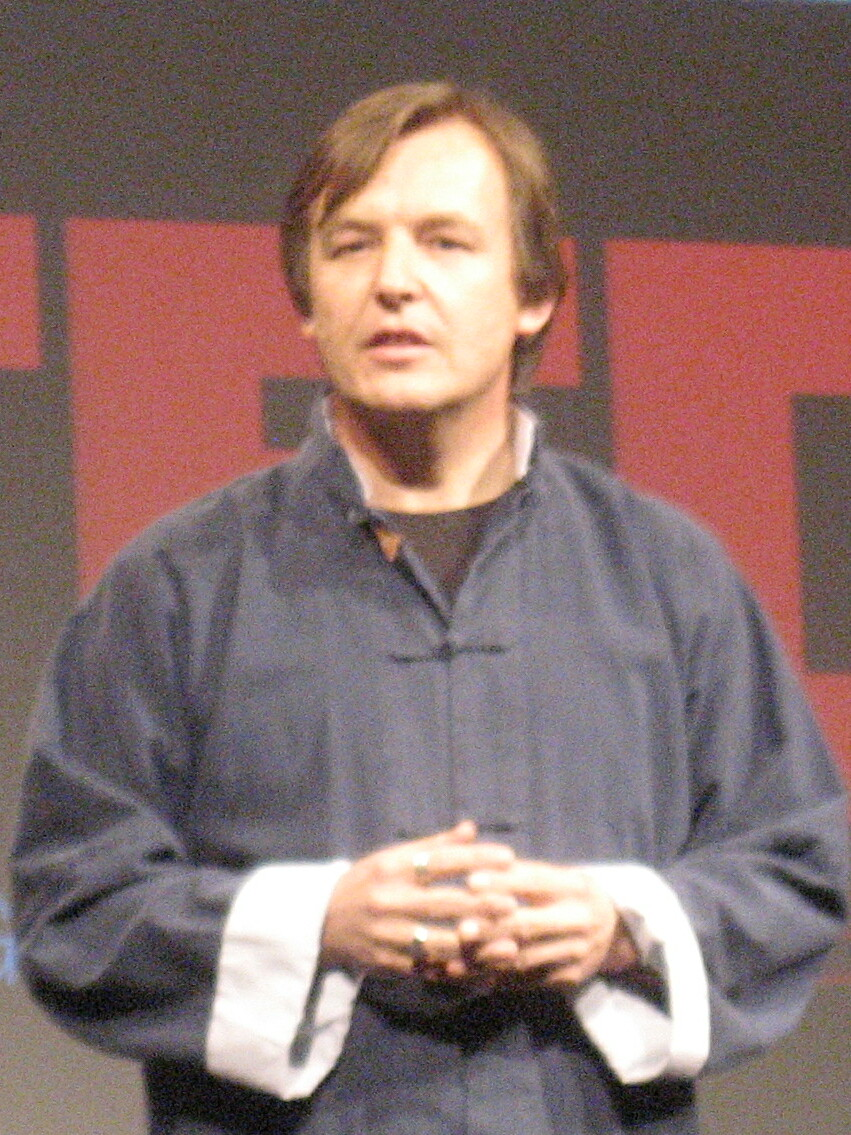
Chris Anderson in 2007

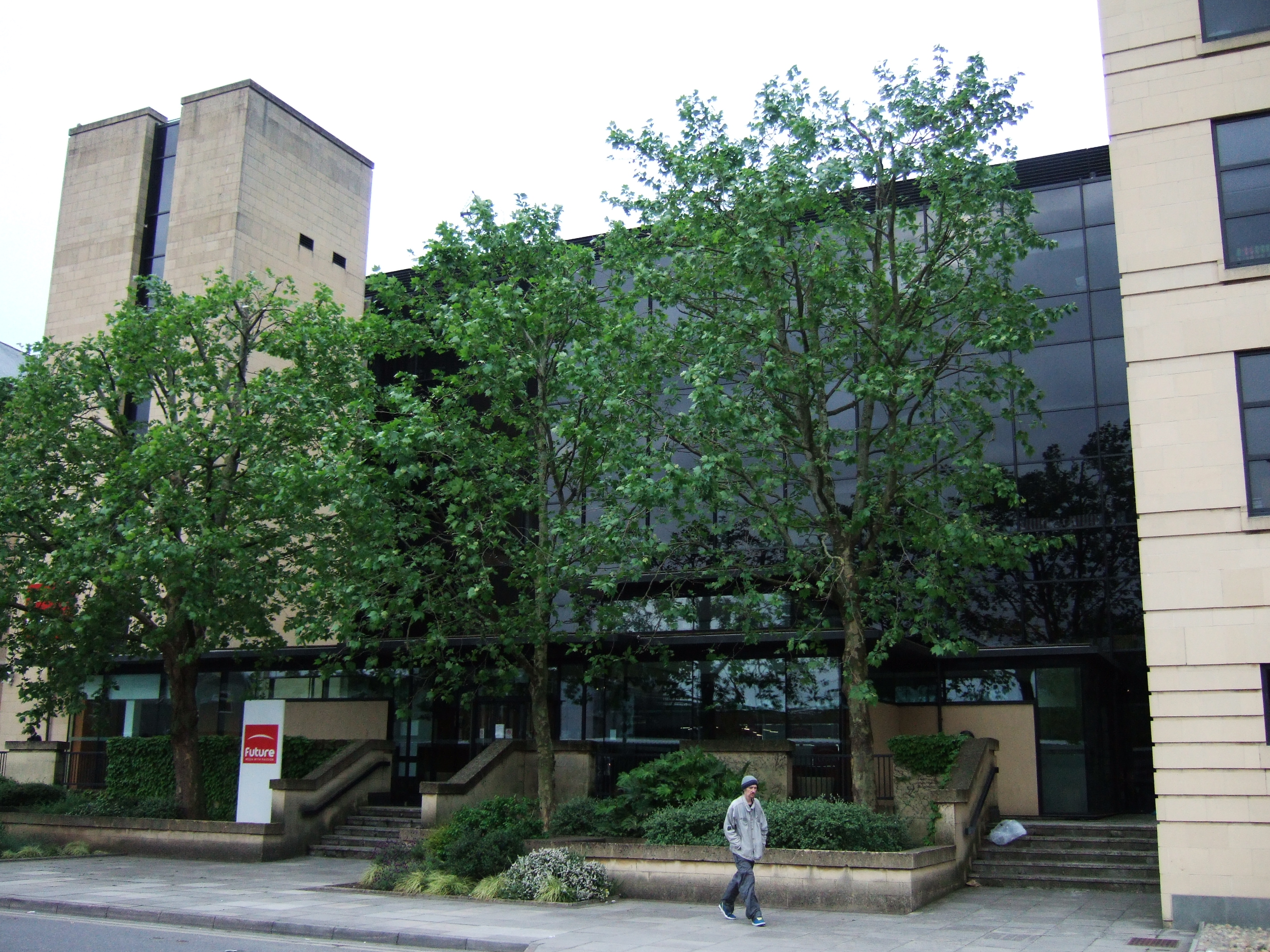
Company office in Bath

Future plc is a British publishing company founded in 1985 by Chris Anderson. It is listed on the London Stock Exchange.

== History ==
=== 1985–2012 ===
The company was founded by Chris Anderson as Future Publishing in Somerton, Somerset, England, with the sole magazine Amstrad Action in 1985. An early innovation was the inclusion of free software on magazine covers. It acquired GP Publications and established what would become Future US in 1994.

Anderson sold the company to Pearson plc for £52.7m in 1994, but bought it back in 1998, for £142 million. The company was floated on the London Stock Exchange in 1999. Anderson left the company in 2001.

In 2004, the company was accused of corruption when it published positive reviews for the video game Driver 3 in two of its owned magazines, Xbox World and PSM2.

=== 2012–2017 ===
Future published the official magazines for the consoles of all three major games console manufacturers (Microsoft, Nintendo, and Sony); however PlayStation: The Official Magazine ceased publishing in November 2012, and Official Nintendo Magazine ceased publishing in October 2014.

The chief executive and finance director both resigned at short notice after a profit warning in October 2011. It was noted that a re-structuring would be necessary as the company moved to a digital model.

Future announced it would cut 55 jobs from its UK operation as part of a restructuring to adapt "more effectively to the company's rapid transition to a primarily digital business model." The company announced in March 2014 that it would close all of its U.S.-based print publications and shift U.S. print support functions such as consumer marketing, production and editorial leadership for Future's international print brands to the UK. Later in 2014, Future sold its sport and craft titles to Immediate Media, and its auto titles to Kelsey Media.

In April 2014, Zillah Byng-Thorne (then finance director) was appointed chief executive to replace Mark Wood, who had been in the position since 2011.

=== Purch ===
In 2003, TechMedia Network, Inc. was established as a New York City-based digital media company. In 2009, TechMedia Network acquired LiveScience, Space.com and Newsarama from Imaginova. Two years later, TechMedia Network acquired Laptop Magazine from Bedford Communications. In July 2013, the company acquired Bestofmedia Group, publisher of Tom's Hardware, Tom's Guide, Tom's IT Pro, and a variety of sister publications across Europe. TechMedia Network acquired BuyerZone.com from Reed Business Information in early 2014.

In April 2014, TechMedia Network changed its name to Purch Group, Inc. and simultaneously announced an exclusive partnership with Mobile Nations, a portfolio of mobile-focused online communities. Purch billed itself as a "portfolio of brands and products focused on purchasing decisions"—consisting primarily of websites focusing on reviews of consumer electronics, positioned to marketers as outlets to "directly engage with buyers in the right place, at the right time". In December 2014, Purch announced the acquisition of AnandTech.

In 2018, Purch sold its consumer brands to Future plc for $132.5 million. Purch's business-to-business division was excluded from the purchase and became Business.com (a brand which Purch had acquired in 2016).

=== 2018–2021 ===
In 2018, Future made further major acquisitions. It bought the What Hi-Fi?, FourFourTwo, Practical Caravan, and Practical Motorhome brands from Haymarket; and it acquired NewBay Media, publisher of numerous broadcast, professional-video, and systems-integration trade titles, as well as several consumer music magazines. This acquisition returned most of the U.S. consumer music magazines to Future, with the exception of Revolver which had been sold to Project M Group in 2017.

It bought Purch for $132m by September 2018, and in February 2019 bought Mobile Nations including the titles Android Central, iMore, Windows Central and Thrifter for $115 million. Future also acquired Procycling and Cyclingnews.com from Immediate Media. In July 2019 the company bought SmartBrief, a digital media publisher, for an initial sum of $45 million.

In November 2019, the company bought Barcroft Studios for £23.5 million in a combination of cash and shares. It renamed it Future Studios and announced the launch of "Future Originals", an anthology gaming series, a "factual" series focusing on the paranormal, and a new true-crime show, in partnership with Marie Claire.

In April 2020, it acquired TI Media with 41 brands for £140 million. In November, it agreed to a £594m takeover of GoCo plc, known for its Gocompare.com price-comparison website. In August 2021, it acquired Dennis Publishing and its 12 magazines, for £300 million.

=== 2022–present ===
The company was criticised in February 2022 for the size of the remuneration package being offered to Zillah Byng-Thorne, the chief executive. It was noted that she could receive £40 million if the company performed well.

Byng-Thorne resigned with effect from 3 April 2023 and was replaced as chief executive by Jon Steinberg.

In April 2023, the company sold its shooting magazines including Shooting Times and Sporting Gun to Fieldsports Press.

In August 2024, the company announced that its American trade papers Broadcasting & Cable and Multichannel News would be closing after more than 90 years, with the main title Broadcasting having been first published in 1931 and the merged title Multichannel News dating from 1980. In October 2024, the company closed a number of consumer titles in the United Kingdom, including Play, All About Space, Total 911, and 3D World, with the monthly movie magazine Total Film ceasing publication after 27 years.

Kevin Li Ying took over the position of CEO on 31 March 2025.

== Organisation ==
In addition to media and magazines, the company has two other businesses:

- Future Studios is its video division, built upon the acquisition of Barcroft Media in 2019.
- Marketforce is its sales, marketing, and distribution company, acquired as part of a 2019 deal with TI Media.

== Brands ==
Future's portfolio of brands includes TechRadar, PC Gamer, Tom's Guide, Tom's Hardware, Marie Claire, GamesRadar+, MusicRadar, How it Works, Digital Camera World, Creative Bloq, CinemaBlend, Android Central, IT Pro, BikePerfect, Truly, Windows Central, Chat, and the website GoodToKnow.co.uk.
