= MacTribe =

Web site and monthly computer magazine dedicated to Apple Macintosh products

- Editor: Daniel Robillard
- Categories: Computing / Mac
- Frequency: Monthly
- Founded: 2008
- First issue: October 15, 2008
- Country: United States
- Based in: Cambridge, Massachusetts
- Website: www.MacTribe.com
- ISSN: 1942-7298

MacTribe is a web site and monthly computer magazine dedicated to Apple Macintosh products. It is headquartered in Cambridge, Massachusetts.

== History ==
MacTribe is both a print magazine and website. In 2005, MacTribe published its first issue online. In 2008, MacTribe published its first print issue presenting a clear alternative to Macworld and Maclife. It was released on October 15, 2008. During the initial period the magazine was published eight times per year.

Distributed by Source Interlink and carried by Barnes and Noble booksellers, the magazine has a circulation of 60,000 per bi-monthly issue and the website boasts over 200,000 unique impressions per month. Capitalizing on other Mac magazine's lack of fashion, culture and lifestyle converge, MacTribe provides information, articles, news and reviews not only on technology and new Apple products but on important happenings in the Mac enthusiast's world.
