= Deventer murder case =

1999 murder case in the Netherlands

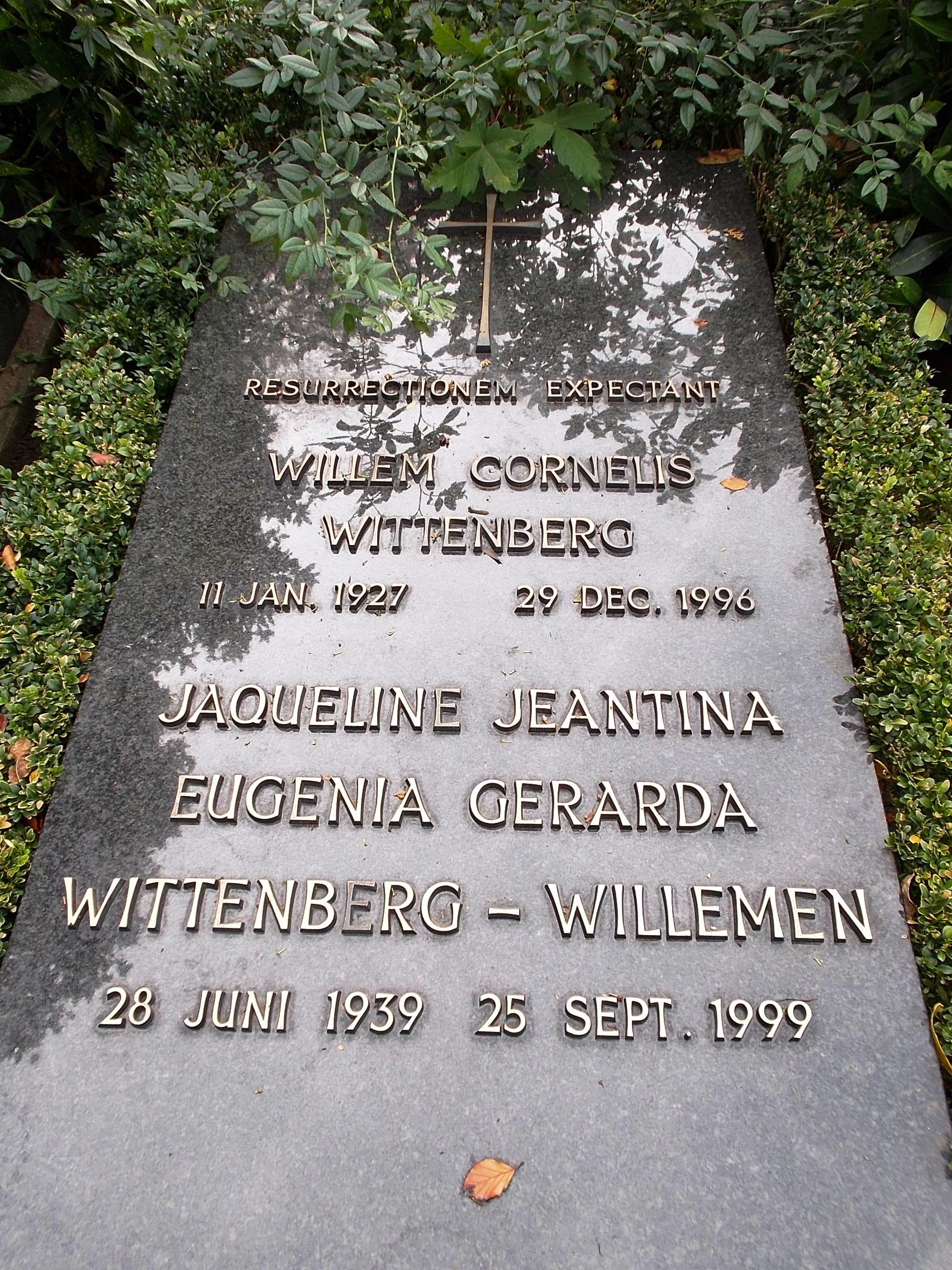
Gravesite of the Wittenberg couple.

The Deventer murder case is a murder case which took place in the Dutch city of Deventer in 1999. It has become a cause célèbre because the murder has officially been solved, but not everybody agrees with the final judgment of the court. The case has been re-opened twice. The first time this was done because the evidence previously used for the conviction had proven to be incorrect, while the second time there were strong clues that another suspect's testimony about his whereabouts during the time of the murder did not match real facts. Nevertheless, the same suspect—former tax advisor Ernest Louwes—has been convicted twice. His second conviction took place on the basis of different evidence from that used during the first trial. However, some people such as the opinion pollster Maurice de Hond are still convinced of Louwes' innocence.

== Background ==
On the evening of 23 September 1999, the Dutch widow Jaqueline Wittenberg was murdered in her house. She was found some days later. Telephone call data indicated that her personal tax advisor Ernest Louwes had been the last one to call her on that night, but Louwes himself claimed he had been outside Deventer at the time of that telephone call. The most convincing piece of evidence was, according to the court of justice, the result of an odour test which had been performed on a knife supposedly used by Louwes to commit his crime. On the basis of this, Louwes was sentenced to twelve years in December 2000. His appeal to the Supreme Court was rejected.

In July 2003, the Dutch Supreme Court still decided to reconsider the case because the odour test performed on the knife had proven to be incorrect. In fact, the knife in question had not been the murder weapon at all. Louwes was released until further notice.

DNA profiling was then used by the Forensic Institute in order to examine the blouse the widow had been wearing at the time she was murdered. However, the results of this test seemed to corroborate once again that Louwes had been the murderer. So on the basis of this new evidence, Louwes was again sentenced to twelve years by the court at Den Bosch in February 2004.

Although the DNA proof in question had been admitted by the court because it was under chain of custody, this is the first controversial part of the case. In fact, it has not become clear at all where the blouse used as crucial evidence had been during the initial period after the murder had been discovered. Two detectives who were officially involved from the beginning were questioned. One of them confirmed in writing that he did not know where the blouse had been shortly after the murder, while the other one had given up his involvement in the case almost immediately after the widow's body had been discovered. These two detectives will possibly be prosecuted because of perjury.

After spending eight years of his sentence in prison, Louwes was released in April 2009.

== New investigation ==
On 31 January 2006, the Dutch Ministry of Justice announced that a new exploratory examination was about to take place, because Maurice de Hond as well as the Dutch legal psychologist Peter van Koppen claimed that they had detected some serious errors which had been made during the criminal investigation. More specifically, they claimed that the dubious roles in the murder case of a man named Michaël de Jong who had at the time been the widow's handyman - and who had been questioned as a witness shortly after the murder -, together with his girlfriend were to be examined more in detail. Louwes' new lawyer Geert-Jan Knoops appealed to the European Court of Human Rights, but this appeal was rejected. The supposed DNA proof on the widow's blouse was re-examined by the British Forensic Science Service on 31 March. The comments on the result of this new investigation differ. Because of the testimony of a grave supervisor who claimed to have seen Michaël de Jong walking with a knife in his hand near the widow's grave, the grave was also opened in November 2006, but nothing was found except for a small chunk of metal.

On 20 March 2007, the Supreme Court decided that the results of the new research were even more incriminating for Louwes than the former ones.

== Aftermath ==
In spite of all this, the Dutch law court still officially considers Louwes to be the real murderer of the widow. In 2007 De Jong and his girlfriend brought a civil suit against De Hond, who was accused of defamation. De Hond has been ordered to pay at first €120,000 and later only €45,000 damages to them.

In December 2011, the Dutch philosopher of science Ton Derksen, who had earlier instigated the re-opening of the case of Lucia de Berk, published a book in which he strongly defends the innocence of Louwes.

== Film adaptation ==
In 2021 the feature film De veroordeling (The Judgement) was released in cinemas. It's based on the case and the role of investigative journalist Bas Haan.
