= Information Technology Lokam =

Magazine

Official logo of IT Lokam

Information Technology Lokam (or IT Lokam) is a monthly computer magazine in Malayalam. It was started in 2001 by Infofriend Publications, in Kozhikode. The magazine is the first venture of the company.

In September 2005, IT Lokam inaugurated a CD edition, like its competitor, Info Kairali. The IT Lokam CD mainly contains free software programs and games, useful articles, demo and shareware programs, wallpapers, drivers, skins, etc.
