= Computer!Totaal =

Dutch monthly magazine

- Cover of Computer!Totaal
- Frequency: Monthly
- Circulation: 95,451 (2010)
- Publisher: IDG Communications Nederland
- Founded: 1977
- Country: Netherlands
- Website: computertotaal.nl
- ISSN: 0927-2739

Computer!Totaal, conveniently abbreviated as C!T, is a Dutch monthly magazine about computers and related subjects. It is the largest computer magazine of the Netherlands.

== History and profile ==
Originally, C!T was the newsletter of the Hobby Computer Club (HCC) and was called HCC Nieuwsbrief. The magazine was started in 1977. It was renamed to the current name in 1992. On 1 October 2008, IDG and HCC terminated their co-operation. From that date onwards, HCC membership and the HCC Nieuwsbrief subscription were no longer linked.

C!T is published by IDG Nederland and part of IDG's PC World product line.

== See also ==
- Personal Computer Magazine, another Dutch computer magazine, published by HUB Uitgevers.
- PC World (magazine), international equivalent published by IDG (also available in a Dutch edition).
