= The Judgement (2020 film) =

2021 Dutch film

- Original title: De veroordeling
- Directed by: Sander Burger
- Written by: Sander Burger; Piet Bouma
- Produced by: Piet-Harm Sterk
- Starring: Fedja van Huêt; Yorick van Wageningen
- Cinematography: Sal Kroonenberg
- Edited by: Manuel Rombley
- Distributed by: Picture Tree International
- Release dates: December 2020 (Seattle Film Festival); September 2, 2021 (Netherlands)
- Running time: 130 minutes
- Country: Netherlands
- Language: Dutch

The Judgement (Dutch: De veroordeling) is a 2020 Dutch drama film based on a non-fiction book by journalist Bas Haan about the Deventer murder case. The film premiered at the Seattle Film Festival where it won six awards: the Grand Jury-prize, best director, best adapted screenplay, best actor (van Huêt), best supporting actor (van Wageningen) and best supporting actress (Visschedijk). The film also won 4 Golden Calves for best film, best actor (Van Huet), best supporting actor (Van Wageningen) and best screenplay.

== Cast ==
- Fedja van Huêt as Bas Haan
- Yorick van Wageningen as Michael de Jong
- Lies Visschedijk as Meike Wittermans
- Mark Kraan as Ernest Louwes
- George Tobal as Steve

Maurice de Hond who has a prominent role in the film was only shown through archival footage.
