= Power Unlimited =

Dutch computer and video games magazine

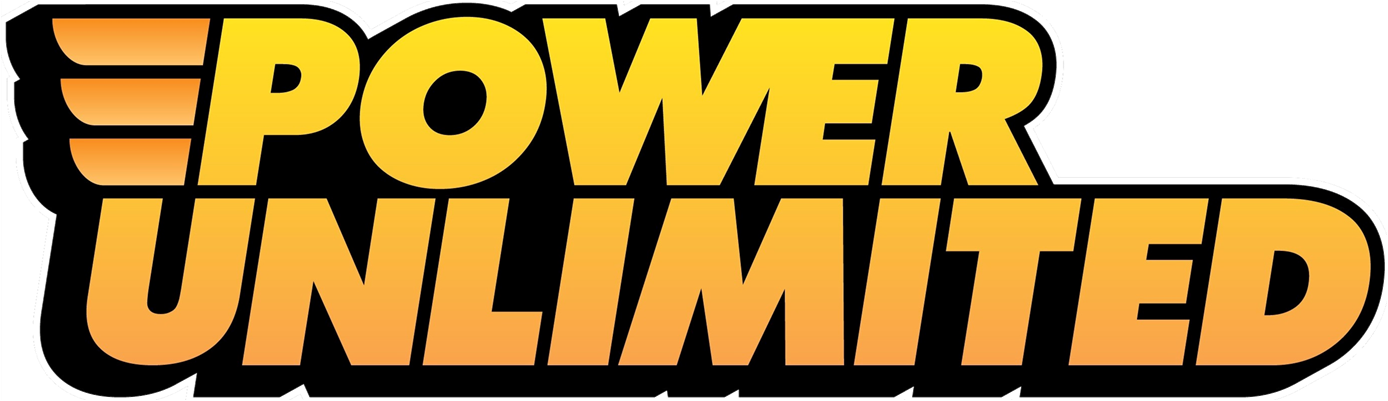
- Former logo (2011–2026)
- Editor: Simon Zijlemans
- Categories: Video games
- Frequency: Semi-quarterly
- Circulation: 23,563 (Q1 2014)
- Publisher: VNU (1993–2007); HUB Uitgevers (2007–2013); Reshift Digital (2013–2026); PaperCroft (since 2026)
- First issue: July 1993
- Country: Netherlands, Belgium
- Language: Dutch
- Website: pumag.nl
- ISSN: 0929-760X

Power Unlimited (often abbreviated as PU) is a Dutch semi-quarterly video game magazine that provides news, background information, and critique. It is sold in the Netherlands and Belgium.

== History ==
Power Unlimited started in July 1993 as a new label of the Verenigde Nederlandse Uitgeverijen (VNU) under publisher Matt Heffels. Because the VNU's other labels were primarily business and educational publications, a video gaming magazine was considered a major risk, as it lacked an established audience. This meant that freelance editors Bjørn Bruinsma (who wrote more than 80% of the first issue and was responsible for initial production, advertising, and negotiations with video game importers), Kees de Koning, Michael Schaeffer, Ben de Dood, David Lemereis, and Adam Eeuwens created the first issues in Bruinsma's living room until the concept proved viable. The staff received their own office at the VNU after six months and an editor-in-chief (Edwin Ammerlaan) and executive editor (Ed Wiggemans) were appointed after a year. In the years that followed, PU grew into the largest video game magazine in the Benelux.

Power Unlimited expanded to other activities when it co-organized the Gameplay events at the annual HCC Days of the Hobby Computer Club, and since 2003 several former editors have hosted Gamekings. This video game show aired on Dutch and Flemish television for 15 years and became a web show in 2017. PU also introduced its own annual video game awards ceremony, the Power Unlimited Game Awards, which in 2005–06 became the TMF Game Awards in collaboration with television channel TMF.

From November 2007, Power Unlimited was published by HUB Uitgevers, which had gained the rights to the magazine and several other publications after the VNU was absorbed into Nielsen Holdings. In August 2013, HUB Uitgevers filed for bankruptcy and PU was acquired the following month by the newly formed Reshift Digital.

In January 2017, Jan Meijroos stepped down as editor of Power Unlimited. He indicated he would have liked to publish a closing blog post on the magazine's website, "but apparently, a different decision was made". PU also fielded an esports team in 2017–18 called Team Power Unlimited, consisting of Rocket League players.

In 2018, the magazine reduced its annual circulation from 12 to 11 issues by skipping a month in the summer. In 2021, the annual circulation was again reduced by one issue, and in 2025 by another two issues, bringing the total number of issues to eight from that year on.

To celebrate the magazine's 30th anniversary in 2023, special issues of Power Unlimited were published and activities were organized. For example, a compilation book on thirty years of video game history was published and an exhibition on thirty years of PU and video game history was organized at the Netherlands Institute for Sound and Vision.

On 14 January 2026, it was announced that Reshift Digital had sold the Power Unlimited brand. This meant that the new owner would manage the magazine's website without the editorial team, while Reshift Digital was given a license to continue publishing the physical magazine under its old name. The new owner of PU.nl is a Maltese gambling company, which has populated the website with AI-generated articles and gambling advertisements. In February, the video game website Unpause was founded by several former editors of Power Unlimited and the video game website Gamer.nl, which had been sold by Reshift Digital at the same time as PU.nl. That same month, the former editors of the online magazine launched the website ID.nl, where they would focus on technology and lifestyle topics in combination with shopping advice. In March, Simon Zijlemans, the magazine's editor-in-chief since 2024, announced the release of the first physical issue following the acquisition via this website.

In August 2026, editor-in-chief Zijlemans and cybersecurity expert Dave Maasland purchased the license for Power Unlimited from Reshift Digital for an undisclosed amount. The new owners expressed their intention to self-publish the magazine with better printing quality, improved content, and greater frequency.

== Features ==
=== Reviews ===
In the 30-year history of the magazine, more than 4,500 games have been reviewed. Reviewed games are given an overall score out of 100. Although several games have received scores high in the 90s, only twenty-three have been given a perfect 100: these are Escape From CyberCity, Mortal Kombat 2, Mortal Kombat 3, Mortal Kombat Trilogy, Sentinel Returns, Art of Fighting 2, Tekken, NBA Jam, Vampire Hunter, Gran Turismo 2, Super Mario Galaxy, Grand Theft Auto IV, LittleBigPlanet, Uncharted 2: Among Thieves, World of Warcraft: Cataclysm, Fallout 3 , Grand Theft Auto V, The Legend of Zelda: Breath of the Wild, Super Smash Bros. Ultimate, The Last of Us Part II, Baldur's Gate 3, Stardew Valley and Death Stranding 2: On the Beach.

Sometimes, however, such as with the game Dead or Alive Xtreme 2, a bogus score is given to make a statement. In the above case, the game was rewarded a score of 99, 1 point higher than The Legend of Zelda: Twilight Princess which was, according to the editor in question, extremely overrated. This was also the case with the game Beavis and Butthead, which was given a 132. In the February issue of 2018 the game Purrfect Date was awarded with a score of 140.

=== Other features ===
The magazine offers news, (p)reviews, a column by either one of the editors or someone games-related, various miscellaneous articles, as well as a comic and a mailbox where readers can voice their opinion, or sometimes have their questions answered by the editors. Editors have stated that the magazine is as much about games as it is about the (gaming) lives of the editors, their experiences in the office, etc.

== Target audience ==
The magazine targets the teenage gamer demographic, specifically male gamers between 12 and 20 years old. Because of the relatively young target audience, Power Unlimited's tone of voice is often rather straightforward and humorous. For example: to most screenshots of featured games jokes and oneliners are added by executive editor Ed Wiggemans.

== Editorial team ==
Notable contributors include radio DJ and TopNotch founder Kees de Koning (1993–2000), rapper Richard Simon (1996–2005, since 2024), journalist Niels 't Hooft (2005–06), and television presenter Simon Zijlemans (since 2024). Most of the magazine editors have been freelancers, some are salaried employees.

The current editorial team consists of:

- Simon Zijlemans (editor-in-chief)
- Florian Houtkamp
- Jurjen Tiersma
- Willem "Graddus" van der Meulen
- Samuel Hubner Casado
- Tjeerd Lindeboom

The magazine styling is done by Johnny Rijbroek, the comic at the back of the magazine by Jordi Peters.
