= Microcomputer Club Nederland =

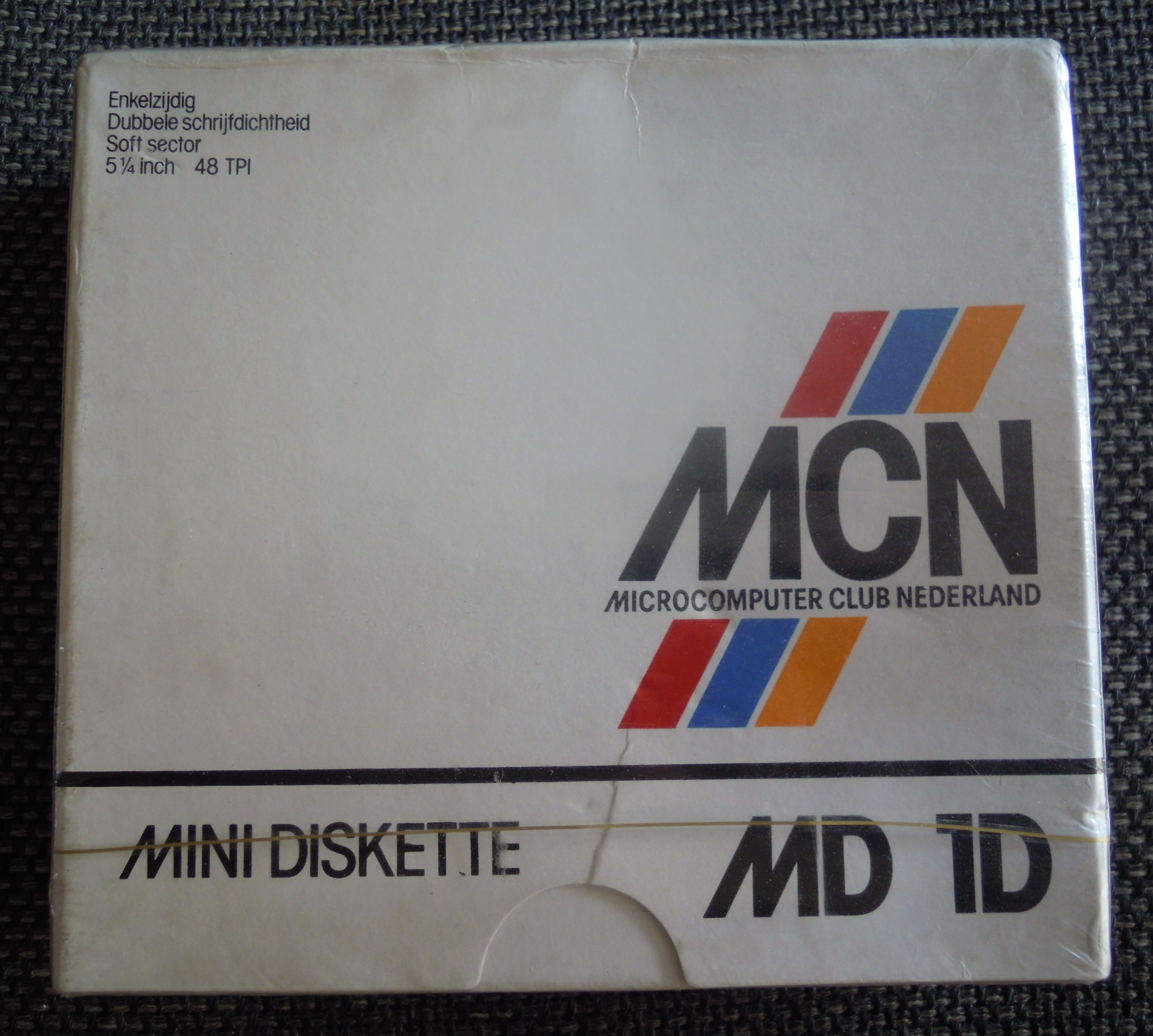
Box of MCN 5¼-inch diskettes

The Microcomputer Club Nederland (MCN) was a Dutch computer club which was founded by Vendex in the mid-1980s. The club was centered on the computer departments of the Vroom & Dreesmann department store and the Dixons electronics stores, which sold home computers such as the Commodore 64, ZX Spectrum and MSX computers. Later they also sold IBM PC compatibles under the brand name Vendex. MCN also issued a same-named magazine and sold accessories such as diskettes under their name.

The director of MCN was Maurice de Hond.

== See also ==
- Hobby Computer Club
- Philips Computers
