= The Devil's Dictionary =

1906 satirical dictionary by Ambrose Bierce

The Cynic's Word Book
- The Cynic's Word Book
- Author: Ambrose Bierce
- Language: English
- Genre: Reference, satire, humor
- Publisher: Arthur F. Bird
- Publication date: 1906
- Publication place: Great Britain (first British edition)
- Followed by: The Devil's Dictionary

The Devil's Dictionary is a satirical dictionary written by American journalist Ambrose Bierce, consisting of common words followed by humorous and satirical definitions. The lexicon was written over three decades as a series of installments for magazines and newspapers. Bierce's witty definitions were imitated and plagiarized for years before he gathered them into books, first as The Cynic's Word Book in 1906 and then in a more complete version as The Devil's Dictionary in 1911.

Initial reception of the book versions was mixed. In the decades following, however, the stature of The Devil's Dictionary grew. It has been widely quoted, frequently translated, and often imitated, earning a global reputation. In the 1970s, The Devil's Dictionary was named as one of "The 100 Greatest Masterpieces of American Literature" by the American Revolution Bicentennial Administration. It has been called "howlingly funny", and Wall Street Journal columnist Jason Zweig said in an interview that The Devil's Dictionary is "probably the most brilliant work of satire written in America. And maybe one of the greatest in all of world literature."

== History ==
=== Predecessors ===
Prior to Bierce, the best-known writer of amusing definitions was Samuel Johnson. His A Dictionary of the English Language was published 15 April 1755. Johnson's Dictionary defined 42,733 words, almost all seriously. A small handful have witty definitions and became widely quoted, but they were infrequent exceptions to Johnson's learned and serious explanations of word meanings.

Noah Webster earned fame for his 1806 A Compendious Dictionary of the English Language and his 1828 An American Dictionary of the English Language. Most people assume that Webster's text is unrelieved by humor, but (as Bierce himself was to discover and describe), Webster made witty comments in a tiny number of definitions.

Gustave Flaubert wrote notes for the Dictionary of Received Ideas (sometimes called Dictionary of Accepted Ideas; in French, Le Dictionnaire des idées reçues) between 1850 and 1855 but never completed it. Decades after his death, researchers combed through Flaubert's papers and published the Dictionary under his name in 1913 (two years after Bierce's book The Devil's Dictionary), "But the alphabetful of definitions we have here is compiled from a mass of notes, duplicates and variants that were never even sorted, much less proportioned and polished by the author."

=== Origins and development ===
Bierce took decades to write his lexicon of satirical definitions. He warmed up by including definitions infrequently in satirical essays, most often in his weekly columns "The Town Crier" or "Prattle". His earliest known definition was published in 1867.

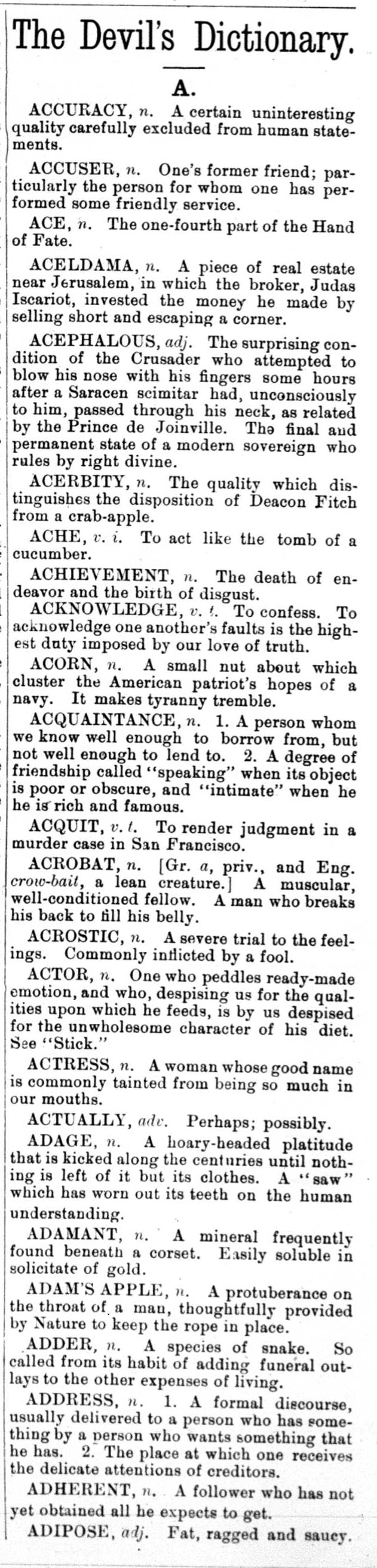
The first "The Devil's Dictionary" column by Ambrose Bierce, from The Wasp, 5 March 1881, vol. 6 no. 240, page 149

His first try at a multiple-definition essay was titled "Webster Revised". It included definitions of four terms and was published in early 1869. Bierce also wrote definitions in his personal letters. For example, in one letter he defined "missionaries" as those "who, in their zeal to lay about them, do not scruple to seize any weapon that they can lay their hands on; they would grab a crucifix to beat a dog."

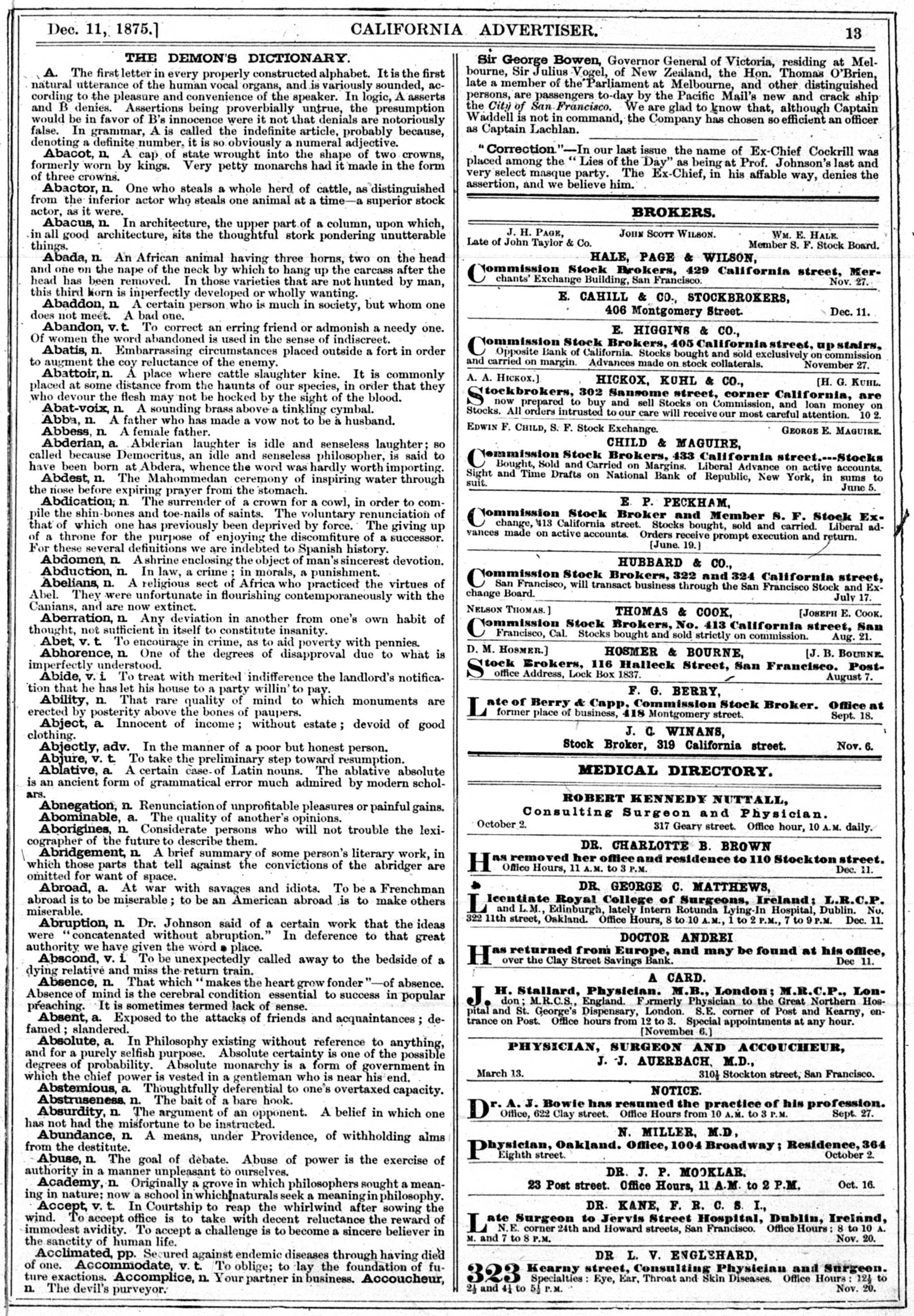
The first "The Demon's Dictionary" column by Ambrose Bierce, from The San Francisco Newsletter and California Advertiser, 11 December 1875, page 13

By summer of 1869 he had conceived of the idea of something more substantial: "Could any one but an American humorist ever have conceived the idea of a Comic Dictionary" he wrote.

Bierce did not make his first start at writing a satirical glossary until six years later. He called it "The Demon's Dictionary", and it appeared in the San Francisco News Letter and California Advertiser of 11 December 1875. His glossary provided 48 short witty definitions, from "A" ("The first letter in every properly constructed alphabet") through "accoucheur". But "The Demon's Dictionary" appeared only once, and Bierce wrote no more satirical lexicons for another six years.

Even so, Bierce's short glossary spawned imitators. One of the most substantial was written by Harry Ellington Brook, the editor of a humor magazine called The Illustrated San Francisco Wasp. Brook's continuing column of serialized satirical definitions was called "Wasp's Improved Webster in Ten-Cent Doses". The column started with the 7 August 1880 issue and appeared weekly in 28 issues, working its way step-by-step alphabetically to define 758 words, ending with "shoddy" in the 26 February 1881 issue.

In the next issue of The Wasp Brook's column appeared no more, because The Wasp hired Bierce and he stopped it, replacing "Wasp's Improved Webster" with his own column of satirical definitions. Bierce named his column “The Devil's Dictionary”. It first appeared in the March 5, 1881 issue. Bierce wrote 79 “The Devil's Dictionary” columns, working his way alphabetically to the word “lickspittle” in the 14 August 1886 issue.

After Bierce left The Wasp, he was hired by William Randolph Hearst to write for his newspaper The San Francisco Examiner in 1887. Bierce's first "Prattle" column appeared in the Examiner on March 5 of that year, and the next installment of his satirical lexicon appeared in the 4 September 1887 issue on page 4, under the title "The Cynic's Dictionary". Bierce wrote one more “The Cynic's Dictionary” column (which ran in the 29 April 1888 Examiner, page 4), and then no more appeared for sixteen years.

In the meantime, Bierce's idea of a "comic dictionary" was imitated by others, and his witty definitions were plagiarized without crediting him. One imitator even copied the name of Bierce's column.

In September 1903, Bierce wrote letters to his friend Herman George Scheffauer mentioning he was thinking about a book of his satirical definitions "regularly arranged as in a real dictionary."

Bierce restarted his “The Cynic's Dictionary” columns with new definitions beginning in June 1904. Hearst's newspaper publishing company had grown nationally, so Bierce's readership had expanded dramatically as well. Now “The Cynic's Dictionary” columns usually appeared first in Hearst's New York American, next in other Hearst papers (San Francisco Examiner, Boston American, Chicago American, Los Angeles Examiner), and then via Hearst's syndication business in other newspapers covering additional cities Hearst newspapers did not reach.

=== Book publication ===
On 4 November 1905, Bierce wrote to a friend that he was at last reshaping the witty definitions from his newspaper columns into a book, and was irritated by his imitators: “I'm compiling The Devil's Dictionary at the suggestion of Doubleday, Page & Co., who doubtless think it a lot of clowneries like the books to which it gave the cue.”

The 25 November 1905 issue of The Saturday Evening Post contained “Some Definitions,” a short list of humorous definitions by Post editor Harry Arthur Thompson. Thompson's definitions were popular enough to generate short sequel lists called “Frivolous Definitions” and to be reprinted in newspapers and magazines. Thompson and his definitions would have an unexpected impact on the publication of Bierce's book.

On 19 March 1906 Bierce signed a contract with Doubleday, Page & Co. for publication of his book, but without his preferred title The Devil's Dictionary. Instead the contract used the same title as Bierce's nationally distributed newspaper columns: The Cynic's Dictionary. Bierce explained to poet and playwright George Sterling: “They (the publishers) won't have The Devil's Dictionary [as a title]. Here in the East the Devil is a sacred personage (the Fourth Person of the Trinity, as an Irishman might say) and his name must not be taken in vain.”

Bierce's publishers quickly discovered that they would not be able to use The Cynic's Dictionary for the title either. Harry Arthur Thompson was turning the handful of definitions he wrote for The Saturday Evening Post into a book. Thompson's book would be published first and would steal Bierce's title. Bierce wrote to Sterling: “I shall have to call it something else, for the publishers tell me there is a Cynic's Dictionary already out. I dare say the author took more than my title—the stuff has been a rich mine for a plagiarist for many a year.”

The new title for Bierce's book would be The Cynic's Word Book. Bierce changed the title of his newspaper columns to “The Cynic's Word Book” to match his book.

Bierce's book was filed for copyright 30 August 1906 and was published October 1906. The Cynic's Word Book contained 521 definitions, but only for words beginning with “A” through “L.”

Doubleday, Page & Co. printed and bound 1,341 copies of The Cynic's Word Book. 147 copies were given to the author and to book reviewers for newspapers and magazines; 1,070 copies were sold; and eventually Doubleday remaindered 124 unsold copies and sold them below the publisher's cost. Doubleday was also able to sell British rights to a small publisher in London, Arthur F. Bird, who brought out a British edition in 1907. Sales of The Cynic's Word Book qualified it from the publisher's point of view as modestly successful, but not strong enough to justify a companion volume of words beginning with “M” through “Z” as Bierce had hoped.

Bierce's plan to cover the entire alphabet was brought back to life by publisher Walter Neale, who persuaded Bierce to sign an agreement with him on 1 June 1908 for Neale to publish The Collected Works of Ambrose Bierce in a set of ten or more volumes. They planned for Volume 7 to be Bierce's lexicon, finally using his preferred title, The Devil's Dictionary.

To create a typescript for Neale to publish, Bierce first marked up a copy of The Cynic's Word Book with changes and a few additions. That work quickly gave him definitions of words beginning with “A” through “L”. Next he took clippings of his newspaper column definitions and revised them. That brought his dictionary up from “L” to early in the letter “R”. Finally Bierce wrote 37 pages of mostly new definitions spanning from “RECONSIDER” to the end of “Z”. On 11 December 1908 Bierce wrote to George Sterling that he had completed work on The Devil's Dictionary.

In 1909 publisher Walter Neale began issuing individual volumes in the 12-volume set The Collected Works of Ambrose Bierce. Volume 7, The Devil's Dictionary, was published in 1911. Unlike most publishers, who sell individual volumes of a published work, Neale focused on selling complete sets of the 12-volume Works. Neale later claimed that he printed and sold 1,250 sets (250 numbered fully leatherbound sets, the first volume of each set signed by Bierce; a small number of sets half-bound in Morocco leather; and the bulk as sets of clothbound hardcovers). However, Neale's surviving royalty statements to Bierce for The Collected Works tell a different story: Bierce was paid for sales of 57 fully leatherbound 12-volume sets, 8 half-Morocco sets, and approximately 164 clothbound hardback sets.

Neale did not sell the rights to print a British edition of The Collected Works of Ambrose Bierce. However, in late 1913 or early 1914 the periodical The London Opinion paid Neale for the right to reprint definitions of 787 words from The Devil's Dictionary.

== Sample definitions ==
Air
(n.) A nutritious substance supplied by a bountiful providence for the fattening of the poor.

Cannon
(n.) An instrument employed in the rectification of national boundaries.

Conservative
(n.) A statesman who is enamored of existing evils, as distinguished from the Liberal, who wishes to replace them with others.

Cynic
(n.) A blackguard whose faulty vision sees things as they are, not as they ought to be. Hence the custom among the Scythians of plucking out a cynic's eyes to improve his vision.

Egotist
(n.) A person of low taste, more interested in himself than in me.

Faith
(n.) Belief without evidence in what is told by one who speaks without knowledge, of things without parallel.

Lawyer
(n.) One skilled in circumvention of the law.

Love
(n.) A temporary insanity curable by marriage...

Marriage
(n.) A household consisting of a master, a mistress, and two slaves, making in all, two.

Positive
(a.) Mistaken at the top of one's voice.

Religion
(n.) A daughter of Hope and Fear, explaining to Ignorance the nature of the Unknowable.

Youth
(n.) The Period of Possibility, when Archimedes finds a fulcrum, Cassandra has a following and seven cities compete for the honor of endowing a living Homer.

Youth is the true Saturnian Reign, the Golden Age on earth again, when figs are grown on thistles, and pigs betailed with whistles and, wearing silken bristles, live ever in clover, and cows fly over, delivering milk at every door, and Justice is never heard to snore, and every assassin is made a ghost and, howling, is cast into Baltimost! —Polydore Smith

Under the entry "leonine", meaning a single line of poetry with an internal rhyming scheme, Bierce included an apocryphal couplet written by the fictitious "Bella Peeler Silcox" (i.e. Ella Wheeler Wilcox) in which an internal rhyme is achieved in both lines only by mispronouncing the rhyming words:

The electric light invades the dunnest deep of Hades.
Cries Pluto, 'twixt his snores: "O tempora! O mores!

== Reception ==
Initial critical reception for The Cynic's Word Book was mixed. Some reviewers praised Bierce's book, such as the anonymous critic for the Los Angeles Herald, who wrote: “It is a dictionary of misdefinitions, funny, witty and with an abiding background of humor, a tinge of real philosophy yet never degenerating into cheapness. One, upon reading it, finds a decided delight upon Bierce's character and his grim morbidness and obsession.”

Other reviewers disliked the sharp edge of Bierce's wit. Some were exhausted trying to read The Cynic's Word Book cover-to-cover, as though it was a thriller or popular novel. Edward F. Cahill of the San Francisco Call concluded of Bierce's definitions: “As paragraphs they were amusing, but in book form they grow tiresome.” Even so, Cahill could not help but quote a definition he found particularly amusing.

Like Cahill, other reviewers—whether they hated The Cynic's Word Book or they loved it—quoted definitions they liked. When the British edition of The Cynic's Word Book was published, one London magazine published a long, nearly full-page approving review; 95% of it was quoted definitions, and the review never mentioned the author Bierce's name even once.

In 1911 The Devil's Dictionary was published as volume 7 of the twelve-volume set of The Collected Works of Ambrose Bierce. Most reviewers of the twelve-volume set didn't mention The Devil's Dictionary in their reviews, and those few who even named the book gave it scant consideration. For example, in a 9¾-page magazine article on Bierce's Collected Works, Frederic Taber Cooper gave The Devil's Dictionary one paragraph, explaining “One is tempted to devote considerably more space than is warranted to that extremely clever collection of satiric definitions, The Devil's Dictionary. It represents a deliberate pose consistently maintained, it is pervaded with a spirit of what a large proportion of readers in a Christian country would pronounce irreverent, it tells us nothing new and can hardly be conceived of as an inspiration for higher or nobler living. But it is undeniably entertaining reading.”

The Athenaeum Journal, one of the most widely circulated literary periodicals in the world, gave The Devil's Dictionary lengthier consideration and observed: “Dealing with a wide range of topics as well as a great number of words, it presents a sort of summary index of the author’s characteristic views as well as his literary aptitudes and poses. . . . Substantial intellectual value belongs to a great many entries that deal with a few large groups of subjects (politics, philosophy, &c.) that are individually too long for quotation.”

Seven years after the book's publication H. L. Mencken, the most influential American literary critic during the first quarter of the twentieth century, praised The Devil's Dictionary highly: “There you will find the most brilliant stuff, first and last, that America has ever produced. There you will find the true masterpiece of the one genuine wit that These States have ever seen.” Mencken later stated the book's contents “… are some of the most gorgeous witticisms in the English language. … In The Devil's Dictionary are some of the most devastating epigrams ever written.”

At that time, critical evaluations of The Devil's Dictionary were rare because copies of the book were hard to find. This scarcity changed in 1925, when the first reprint of The Devil's Dictionary was published, making the book easy to obtain. About the same time, the first abridged version was published by Haldeman-Julius as a Little Blue Book with a budget price of five cents. As The Devil's Dictionary became widely available, critical coverage of it increased.

The New York Times reviewed one reprinted edition: “It is a tour de force of no mean proportions, because it is possible to read it from cover to cover without being bored, so amusing are his unexpected turns of caustic humor, so brilliant his flagitious wit and so diverting the verses and dicta of non-existent philosophers as ‘Father Cassalasca Jape, S. J.’, with which he illustrates them.”

After receiving attention from reviewers in newspapers and commercial magazines, The Devil's Dictionary started to receive analyses from scholars in dissertations and academic journals. They investigated the place of Bierce's writing in the world's history of satire, how The Devil's Dictionary achieved its humorous effects, and the themes Bierce stressed in the book. In an often-cited essay, French author Jacques Sternberg categorized the caustic wit of The Devil's Dictionary as an example of humor noir.

Reprinted editions sometimes provided critical information about the book in the form of introductions by literary critics, Bierce scholars, or Bierce's biographers. In addition, the many imitators and successors of The Devil's Dictionary occasionally included thoughtful comments on Bierce's achievement.

Scholars came to agree that The Devil's Dictionary is “of primary importance to any study, understanding, or appreciation of Ambrose Bierce.” Critics noted that the Dictionary's definitions are frequently quoted, both with and without attribution, so several of Bierce's observations have been absorbed into American culture, familiar to and repeated by people who have no idea where the witticisms originated. Critics also noticed that Bierce used his humorous dictionary as a vehicle for moral instruction, as “… he often induced the readers to reexamine the validity of their own thinking.” A critical consensus has evolved that considers The Devil's Dictionary as “An American masterpiece of cynical wit” and "… probably the most brilliant work of satire written in America. And maybe one of the greatest in all of world literature."

In 1973, the American Revolution Bicentennial Administration was created by an act of Congress to create events and commemorations to celebrate the 200th anniversary of the signing of the Declaration of Independence. The Bicentennial Administration decided to select “The 100 Greatest Masterpieces of American Literature,” one hundred books written by Americans that “actually helped to shape the very course of our nation.” Faculty members of universities in all fifty states submitted nominations. The final choices included 99 volumes of fiction, nonfiction, poetry, and plays, but only one volume of humor: The Devil's Dictionary.

Since then the critical reputation of The Devil's Dictionary has continued to expand, as has the book's popularity with readers, by means of reprints, illustrated versions, and abridged editions continuously published in a dozen languages around the world.

== Noteworthy editions ==
- New York: Doubleday, Page & Co., [October] 1906 (as The Cynic's Word Book). First edition. Includes 521 definitions beginning with A-L.
- London: Arthur F. Bird, [stated publication year 1906; actual publication year 1907] (as The Cynic's Word Book). First British edition.
- New York and Washington, D.C.: Neale Publishing, 1909-1912 [The Collected Works of Ambrose Bierce: Volume VII]. First edition with the title The Devil's Dictionary. Includes 1,013 definitions.
- New York: Albert & Charles Boni, 1925, 1926, 1935, 1944. First reprint.
- Girard, KS: Haldeman-Julius, c. 1926. Little Blue Book No. 1056. First abridged edition.
- New York: Citadel Press, 1946 (in The Collected Writings of Ambrose Bierce). Introduction by Clifton Fadiman. First inclusion in an anthology.
- New York: Hill & Wang, 1957, 1961, 1962, 1968; Mattituck, NY: Amereon, 1983. Introduction by Bierce biographer Carey McWilliams (journalist).
- New York: Peter Pauper Press, 1958
- Garden City, N.Y., Doubleday, 1967; London: Victor Gollancz, 1967, 1968; Harmondsworth, UK or London: Penguin, 1971, 1983, 1985, 1989, 1990, 2001 (as The Enlarged Devil's Dictionary), Ernest Jerome Hopkins, ed. Preface by John Meyers Meyers. Introduction by Hopkins. To Bierce's 1911 book, Hopkins adds 851 definitions from other sources, including 189 not by Bierce but from Harry Ellington Brook, the editor of The Wasp.
- New York: Limited Editions Club, 1972. Limited to 1,500 copies signed by artist Fritz Kredel. Introduction by Louis Kronenberger.
- Owings Mills, MD: Stemmer House, 1978. Introduction by Lawrence R. Suhre.
- Franklin Center, PA: Franklin Library, 1980. Series: 100 Greatest Masterpieces of American Literature. Leatherbound limited edition.
- Chicago, IL: First Comics, February 1991 (as The Devil's Dictionary and Other Works). (Reprinted: New York: Papercutz, 2010; Godalming, UK: Melia, 2010) Series: Classics Illustrated. Adapted and illustrated by Gahan Wilson.
- New York, Oxford: Oxford University Press, 1999, 2002. Introduction by Bierce biographer Roy Morris, Jr.
- Athens, GA: University of Georgia Press, 2000, 2002 (as The Unabridged Devil's Dictionary), David E. Schultz and S. T. Joshi, eds. Lengthy, information-packed introduction covers The Devil's Dictionary as a work of moral instruction and provides the most detailed history of Bierce's writing of the text, the 1906 book publication of The Cynic's Word Book, and the 1911 book publication of The Devil's Dictionary. Main body of the text adds 632 definitions from Bierce's writings to provide 1,645 definitions. Omits 189 definitions incorrectly attributed to Bierce by Ernest Jerome Hopkins. Appendices provide an additional 35 “supplemental definitions” that Bierce wrote for the 1911 book but did not use, plus 49 “other definitions” gleaned from Bierce's other published books and journalism. Does not include definitions Bierce wrote in letters. Includes detailed bibliography of every appearance and variation for each definition. Extensively annotated throughout.
- Mount Horeb, WI: Eureka Productions, 2003 (as The Devil's Dictionary and More Tales of War, Satire, and the Supernatural). Series: Graphics Illustrated. Adapted and illustrated by Rick Geary.
- London: Folio Society, 2003, 2004, 2010. Introduction by Miles Kington. Illustrations by Peter Forster.
- London, Berlin, New York: Bloomsbury Publishing, 2003, 2004, 2008. Introduction by Angus Calder. Illustrations by Ralph Steadman.
- New York: Barnes & Noble, 2007. Introduction by Craig A. Warren.
- Boone, IA: Library of America, 2011 (in Ambrose Bierce: The Devil's Dictionary, Tales, and Memoirs), S. T. Joshi, ed.

=== Translated editions ===
See Translations of The Devil's Dictionary.

== Adaptations ==
- Berkman, Alexander (June 1917). "War Dictionary." The Blast, vol. 2, no. 5.
- Tubb, E. C. (1957) "The Devil's Dictionary" (short story). Supernatural Stories, no. 9.
- Baksa, Robert F. (1978). "Four songs to poetry from The Devil's Dictionary by Ambrose Bierce." New York: Composers Library Editions.
- Kulesha, Gary (1971–1993). "Six bagatelles from The Devil's Dictionary for woodwind quintet" ("Cynic," "Alone," "Dictator," "Reality," "Idiot," and "Eulogy").
- Heritage, Helen (2008). The Devil's Dictionary (play).

== Successors ==
The Devil's Dictionary has spawned many successors, including:

- Esar, Evan (1943). Esar's Comic Dictionary. Harvest House. LCCN 43014172.
- Levinson, Leonard Louis, ed. (1963). The Left Handed Dictionary. Collier. OCLC 154126553.
- Rossiter, Leonard (1980). Devil's Bedside Book. Hamlyn. ISBN 0-600-20105-8.
- Kelly-Bootle, Stan (1981). The Devil's DP dictionary. New York: McGraw-Hill. ISBN 9780070340220., republished as Kelly-Bootle, Stan (1995). The Computer Contradictionary. The MIT Press. ISBN 9780262611121.
- Volkart, Edmond Howell (1986). The Angel's Dictionary: a Modern Tribute to Ambrose Bierce. F. Watts. ISBN 978-0-531150-01-6
- Rollins, L.A. Rollins (1987). Lucifer's Lexicon
- Bayan, Rick (1994). The Cynic's Dictionary. Hearst Books. ISBN 0-7858-1713-1. LCCN 94005472.
- Chambers (2008). Chamber's Gigglossary. Chambers. ISBN 978-0-550-10414-4.
- Carter, Steven (2009). The New Devil's Dictionary, Napoli: Edizioni dell'Istituto Italiano di Cultura.
- Foy, Barry (2009). The Devil's Food Dictionary. Frogchart Press. ISBN 978-0-9817590-0-5.
- Mellie, Roger (2010). Roger's Profanisaurus. Dennis Publishing. ISBN 978-1-907232-90-9. OCLC 45570963.
- Abbott, Derek (2011). Wickedictionary. CreateSpace. ISBN 978-1-4636-6826-6.
- Koenig, Rhoda (2012). The New Devil's Dictionary: A New Version of the Cynical Classic. Lyons Press. ISBN 978-0-762772-47-6.
- CrimethInc. (2013). Contradictionary. CrimethInc. Ex-Workers Collective. OCLC 838418151.
- Kohout, Pavel (2014). Ďáblův slovník ekonomie a financí. V Praze: Internet Art.
- Napoli, James (2014). The Official Dictionary of Sarcasm. Fall River. ISBN 978-1-4351-5579-4
- Schuberth, Richard (2014). Das neue Worterbuch des Teufels [The new Devil's Dictionary]: Ein aphoristisches Lexikon mit zwei Essays zu Ambrose Bierce und Karl Kraus sowie aphoristischen Reflexionen zum Aphorismus selbst. Klever Verlag. ISBN 978-3-902665-75-1
- Zweig, Jason (2015). The Devil's Financial Dictionary
