= Gizmodo =

American design, technology, science, and science fiction website and blog

- Website type: Design, technology, science, science fiction, blog
- Available in: English, French, Dutch, Italian, German, Japanese, Polish, Portuguese, Spanish
- Country of origin: United States
- Owner: Keleops Media
- Creator: Peter Rojas
- Editor: Rory Carroll
- Website: gizmodo.com
- Commercial: Yes
- Registration: Optional
- Launched: July 1, 2002; 24 years ago

Gizmodo (/ɡɪzˈmoʊdoʊ/; giz-MOH-doh) is an American design, technology, science, and science fiction website. It was originally launched as part of the Gawker Media network run by Nick Denton. Gizmodo also includes the sub-blogs io9 and Earther, which focus on pop-culture and environmentalism, respectively.

Following the Chapter 11 bankruptcy and liquidation of Gawker Media, Univision purchased Gizmodo along with other Gawker websites in August 2016. In 2019, Univision sold the Gizmodo Media Group, which included Gizmodo, to the private equity firm Great Hill Partners.

From April 2019 to June 2024, Gizmodo was part of G/O Media. In June 2024, the website was purchased by Swiss digital media company Keleops Media.

== History ==
=== Origins and Gawker Media ===
The blog, launched in 2002, was originally edited by Peter Rojas, who was later recruited by Weblogs, Inc. to launch its similar technology blog, Engadget. By mid-2004, Gizmodo and Gawker together were bringing in revenue of approximately $6,500 per month. In 2005, VNU Media and Gawker Media formed an alliance to republish Gizmodo across Europe, with VNU translating the content into French, German, Dutch, Spanish, Italian, and Portuguese, and adding European-interest material.

In 2011, Gizmodo underwent a major redesign. In 2013, Matt Novak moved his Paleofuture blog to Gizmodo from Smithsonian.

In 2015, the Gawker blog io9 was merged into Gizmodo. The staff of io9 continued with Gizmodo, posting articles on subjects covered by the website, including science fiction, fantasy, futurism, science, technology and astronomy.

=== Univision and G/O Media ===
Gizmodo logo used until 2025

Gizmodo was one of six websites purchased by Univision Communications in its acquisition of Gawker Media in 2016. Univision in turn sold Gizmodo and an array of sister websites to private equity firm Great Hill Partners in 2019; it combined the various former Gawker publications under the name G/O Media. In 2021, David M. Ewalt became the editor-in-chief (EIC) of Gizmodo with Andrew Couts promoted to executive editor; Ewalt left in 2023 for The Messenger. In January 2024, Rory Carroll was promoted from EIC of Jalopnik to group editor of both Jalopnik and Gizmodo. In March 2024, Rose Pastore was promoted from Gizmodo's deputy editor to its executive editor.

G/O Media's leadership, introduced after the purchase from Univision, was frequently criticized by employees. Complaints included closer advertiser relationships, lack of diversity, and suppression of reporting about the company itself. The company also saw multiple disputes with the employee union GMG Union. On June 29, 2023, G/O Media implemented a "modest test" of artificial intelligence-generated content on its websites, such as io9. The move sparked backlash from GMG Union members, citing AI's track record of false statements and plagiarism from its training data; basic errors in the generated content also attracted attention.

=== Keleops Media ===
In June 2024, Gizmodo was purchased by the Swiss digital media company Keleops Media. It was the company's "first U.S. acquisition"; Keleops "owns several French-language technology titles, including legacy brands 01net and Presse-citron". Mark Stenberg of Adweek wrote that "financial terms of the transaction were not disclosed. The entire Gizmodo staff will receive offer letters to stay with the company, and Keleops plans to expand the team in the near future". Stenberg reported that, per Keleops CEO Jean-Guillaume Kleis, "the company has no immediate plans to change Gizmodo, either from a commercial or editorial perspective" and will instead "work with Gizmodo editor-in-chief Rory Carroll to discuss its forward-looking editorial plan and identify growth areas to support with investment". Claudia Cohen of Le Figaro wrote that "it is rare for a European media group to get its hands on an American player, who is also specialized in the field of tech". Kleis told the French newspaper that they "paid the price to enter the American market through a good door". Keleops would later buy Kotaku from G/O Media the following June, reuniting the two publications.

In September 2025, Gizmodo launched their redesigned website.

== Associated outlets ==
=== International ===
Gizmodo launched associated outlets in various international markets:

- In 2006, Gizmodo Japan was launched by Mediagene.
- In 2007, Gizmodo Australia was launched in the US, by Allure Media under license from Gawker Media. This site incorporates additional Australian content, and is branded Gizmodo AU. In 2018, Australian media company Nine Entertainment merged the business behind PEDESTRIAN.TV with that of Allure Media and formed the larger Pedestrian Group; the website and associated company changed its name to Pedestrian, and also incorporated the brands Gizmodo AU, Business Insider Australia, Kotaku Australia and POPSUGAR Australia. It was announced in July 2024 that Gizmodo AU would shut down amid a restructuring at Pedestrian.
- In November 2007, HUB Uitgevers took over the Dutch magazine license from VNU Media.
- In September 2008, Gizmodo Brazil was launched with Portuguese content.
- In September 2011, Gizmodo UK was launched with Future, to cover British news. Gizmodo UK was later shut down in September 2020, with all web links redirecting to Gizmodo.com.

=== Sub-blogs ===
Gizmodo contains two sub-blogs as part of the wider site:

==== io9 ====
io9 is a science fiction and fantasy pop-culture focused sub-blog which was launched as a standalone blog in 2008 by then editor Annalee Newitz under Gawker Media, before being folded under Gizmodo in 2015 as part of a reorganization under parent company Gawker. In 2021, James Whitbrook replaced Jill Pantozzi as the site's deputy editor.

==== Earther ====
Earther logo used from 2017 to 2023

Earther is an environmental news sub-blog which was launched in September 2017. Earther launched with the mission to chronicle three main topics: "The future of Earth," "The future of humans on Earth," and "The future of life on Earth." Founding managing editor Maddie Stone said that the site was created because it "felt like a salient and important time to create a destination for environmental news where folks can go to read up on the latest studies, but also hear the latest news about how natural disasters are affecting people, the big important environmental policies being raised around the world, and some of the biggest conservation stories."

During its lifetime, former Earther journalists Yessenia Funues, Brian Kahn, and Molly Taft won SEAL Awards for their environmental reporting.

As of broader G/O Media layoffs in November 2023 the last member of the sub-blog, Angely Mercado, was laid off which meant that there were then no staff listed as working for the sub-blog.

== Controversy ==
=== TV-B-Gone ===
Richard Blakeley, a videographer for Gizmodo's publisher, Gawker Media, disrupted several presentations held at CES in 2008. Blakely secretly turned off TVs using TV-B-Gone remote controls, resulting in his being barred from CES 2008, and any future CES events.

=== iPhone 4 prototype ===
In April 2010, Gizmodo came into possession of what was later known to be a prototype of the iPhone 4 smartphone by Apple. The site purchased the device for US$5,000 from Brian J. Hogan, who had found it unattended at a bar in Redwood City, California, a month earlier. UC Berkeley student Sage Robert, an acquaintance of Hogan, allegedly helped him sell the phone after failing to track down the owner. With Apple confirming its provenance, bloggers such as John Gruber and Ken Sweet speculated that this transaction may have violated the California Penal Code.

On April 26, after Gizmodo returned the iPhone to Apple, upon Apple's request California's Rapid Enforcement Allied Computer Team executed a search warrant on editor Jason Chen's home and seized computers, hard drives, servers, cameras, notes, and a file of business cards, under direction from San Mateo County’s Chief Deputy District Attorney Stephen Wagstaffe. Since then, Gizmodo and the prosecution have agreed that a special master will review the contents of the items seized and determine if they contain relevant information. Gizmodo was since barred from Apple-hosted events and product launches until August 2014, when they were invited once again to Apple's September 2014 "Wish we could say more" event.

=== Bobby Kotick ===
In March 2025, former Activision Blizzard CEO Bobby Kotick sued G/O Media for defamation, claiming articles in Kotaku and Gizmodo which noted his interest in acquiring TikTok repeated claims of widespread workplace misconduct on his watch at Activision without noting that the claims were investigated and dismissed by state regulators. Kotick said he and his representatives repeatedly asked for corrections to the articles.

== See also ==
- Lifehacker
- Techcrunch
- Wired
