= Netherlands Forensic Institute =

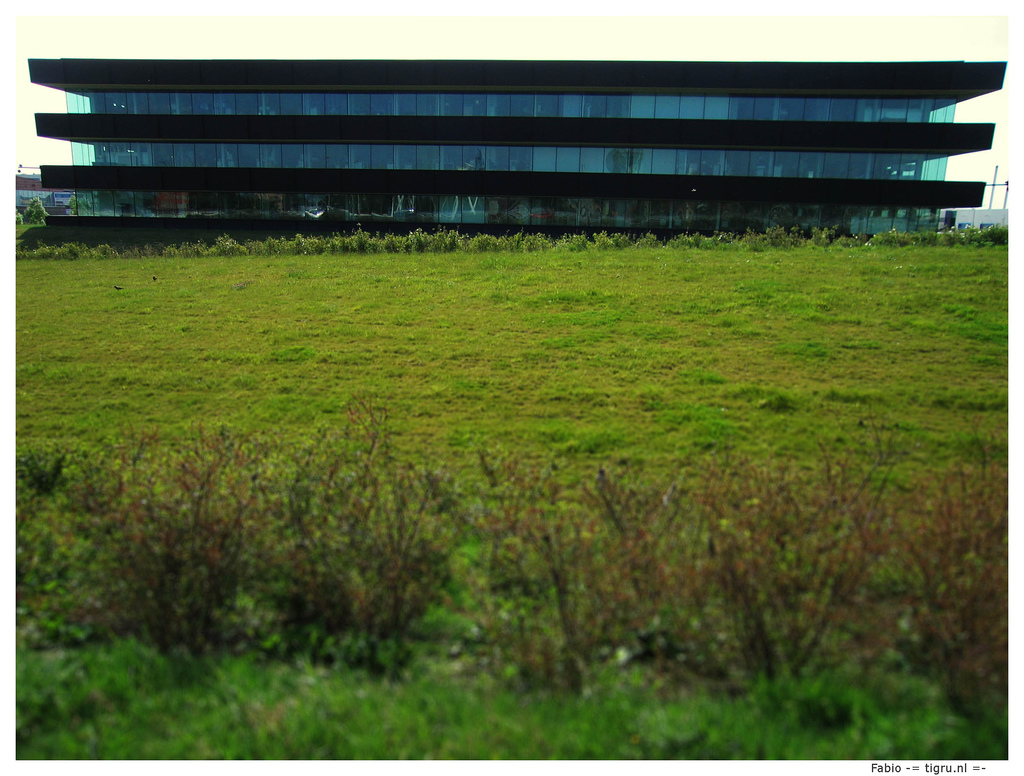
Netherlands Forensic Institute in Ypenburg.

The Netherlands Forensic Institute (Dutch Nederlands Forensisch Instituut) is the national forensics institute of the Netherlands, located in the Ypenburg quarter of The Hague.

It is a agency of the Dutch Ministry of Justice and Security and falls under the Directorate-General for the Administration of Justice and Law Enforcement.

== History ==
On 30 July 1945, the government decided to set up a Justice Laboratory. Three years later, on 4 November 1948, the laboratory became a department of the Ministry of Justice.

A similar institution was founded in 1951: Gerechtelijk Geneeskundig Laboratorium (Judicial Medical Laboratory), which was later renamed Laboratorium voor Gerechtelijke Pathologie Laboratory for Judicial Pathology which were located at the building in The Hague which was later used by Europol.

Pathologist Dr. Jan Zeldenrust was the first director of this laboratory.

On 1 November 1999, the two laboratories merged into the Nederlands Forensisch Instituut (Netherlands Forensic Institute).

The laboratory was based in Rijswijk until October 2004, when it moved to the Ypenburg quarter of The Hague.

== See also ==
- Deventer murder case
