= Personal Computer Magazine =

Dutch computing magazine

- Personal Computer Magazine (June 6, 2011)
- Frequency: Monthly
- Circulation: 50,000
- Publisher: HUB Uitgevers
- First issue: October 1983; 42 years ago
- Country: Netherlands
- Based in: Amsterdam
- Website: pcmweb.nl
- ISSN: 0772-8077
- OCLC: 72700534

Personal Computer Magazine, PCMagazine or PCM was a Dutch monthly magazine about personal computers

The first edition of PCM was issued in October 1983 by VNU Business Publications. In November 2007 PCM went over to HUB Uitgevers. Following HUB Uitgevers' bankruptcy in 2013, the company was restructured and continued operations under the name Reshift Digital. The magazine appeared in a circulation of roughly 50.000 copies per month. The magazine is aimed at the beginning hobbyist and home user as well as experienced and business users. Generally the magazine covers Windows more than other platforms. Publisher ReShift decided to stop publishing PCM in 2022 because of continued decreasing subscriber numbers.

== See also ==
- Computer!Totaal
