= Computer magazine =

Magazine about computers and related subjects

An example of computer (and internet) magazine was net, this magazine was initially targeting internet users in general before shifting to web design until its final issue in June 2020.

Computer magazines are about computers and related subjects, such as networking and the Internet. Most computer magazines offer (or offered) advice, some offer programming tutorials, reviews of the latest technologies, and advertisements.

== History ==
=== 1940s–1950s ===
Sources:.

- Mathematics of Computation established in 1943, articles about computers began to appear from 1946 (Volume 2, Number 15) to the end of 1954. (Note: In 1955, the "Automatic Computing Machinery" column was removed, but the full-length articles about computers still continued to appear with varying frequency.) Scientific journal.
- Digital Computer Newsletter, (1949–1968), founded by Albert Eugene Smith.
- Computers and People, (1951–1988), was arguably the first computer magazine. It began as Roster of Organizations in the Field of Automatic Computing Machinery (1951–1952), (Note: Alternative title: Roster of Organizations in the Computing Machinery Field.) and then The Computing Machinery Field (1952–1953). It was published by Edmund Berkeley. Computers and Automation held the first Computer Art Contest in 1963 and maintained a bibliography on computer art starting in 1966. It also included a monthly estimated census of all installed computer systems starting in 1962. In 1973 name changed to Computers and Automation and People, and finally in 1975 to Computers and People.
- AFIPS conference proceedings (AFIPS Joint Computer Conferences) (1952–1987).
- ACM National Conference proceedings (Proceedings of National Meetings) (1952, 1956–1987, 1997) (Note: First published in 1952, regular publication started in 1964 (Publications in computing: an informal review, p. 494).)
- IEEE Transactions on Computers from 1952, scientific journal.
- Computing News (1953–1963), was an early computer magazine produced by Jackson W. Granholm out of Thousand Oaks, California. The first documented copyright was applied for on September 1, 1954, for issue #36. The magazine was released on the 1st and 15th of each month, which places issue #1 at March 15, 1953. The last documented release was issue #217 on March 15, 1962.
- Journal of the ACM from 1954, scientific journal.
- Datamation from 1957, was another early computer and data processing magazine. It is still being published as an e-publication on the Internet. Futurist Donald Prell was its founder.
- Information and Computation from 1957, scientific journal.
- IBM Journal of Research and Development from 1957, scientific journal.
- Communications of the ACM from 1958, mix of science magazine, trade magazine, and a scientific journal
- The Computer Journal from 1958, scientific journal.

=== 1960s–1970s ===
- ACS Newsletter (1966–1976), Amateur Computer Society newsletter.
- Computerworld (1967)
- People's Computer Company Newsletter (1972–1981)
- Amateur Computer Club Newsletter (ACCN; 1973–)
- Dr. Dobb's Journal (1976–2014) was the first microcomputer magazine to focus on software, rather than hardware.

=== 1980s ===
In the 1980s, computer magazines skewed their content towards the hobbyist end of the then-microcomputer market, and used to contain type-in programs, but these have gone out of fashion. The first magazine devoted to this class of computers was Creative Computing. Byte was an influential technical journal that published until the 1990s.

In 1983, an average of one new computer magazine appeared each week. By late that year more than 200 existed. Their numbers and size grew rapidly with the industry they covered, and BYTE and 80 Micro were among the three thickest magazines of any kind per issue. Compute!'s editor in chief reported in the December 1983 issue that "all of our previous records are being broken: largest number of pages, largest-number of four-color advertising pages, largest number of printing pages, and the largest number of editorial pages".

By that year the IBM PC's success influenced the industry, with two of the four computer magazines with the most advertising pages in February 1983 devoted to it. Computers were the only industry with product-specific magazines, like 80 Micro, PC Magazine, and Macworld; their editors vowed to impartially cover their computers whether or not doing so hurt their readers' and advertisers' market, while claiming that their rivals pandered to advertisers by only publishing positive news.

BYTE, in March 1984, apologized for publishing articles by authors with promotional material for companies without describing them as such, and in April suggested that other magazines adopt its rules of conduct for writers, such as prohibiting employees from accepting gifts or discounts.

InfoWorld stated in June that many of the "150 or so" industry magazines published articles without clearly identifying authors' affiliations and conflicts of interest.

Around 1985, many magazines ended. However, as their number exceeded the amount of available advertising revenue despite revenue in the first half of the year five times that of the same period in 1982. Consumers typically bought computer magazines more for advertising than articles, which benefited already leading journals like BYTE and PC Magazine and hurt weaker ones. Also affecting magazines was the computer industry's economic difficulties, including the video game crash of 1983, which badly hurt the home-computer market.

Dan Gutman, the founder of Computer Games, recalled in 1987 that "the computer games industry crashed and burned like a bad night of Flight Simulator—with my magazine on the runway". Antic's advertising sales declined by 50% in 90 days, Compute!'s number of pages declined from 392 in December 1983 to 160 ten months later, and Compute! and Compute!'s Gazette's publisher assured readers in an editorial that his company "is and continues to be quite successful ... even during these particularly difficult times in the industry". Computer Gaming World stated in 1988 that it was the only one of the 18 color magazines that covered computer games in 1983 to survive the crash. Compute! similarly stated that year that it was the only general-interest survivor of about 150 consumer-computing magazines published in 1983.

Some computer magazines in the 1980s and 1990s were issued only on disk (or cassette tape, or CD-ROM) with no printed counterpart; such publications are collectively (though somewhat inaccurately) known as disk magazines and are listed separately.

=== 1990s ===
In some ways, the heyday of printed computer magazines was a period during the 1990s. During this period, a large number of computer manufacturers took out advertisements in computer magazines, so they became quite thick and could afford to carry quite a number of articles in each issue. Computer Shopper was a good example of this trend.

Some printed computer magazines used to include covermount floppy disks, CDs, or other media as inserts; they typically contained software, demos, and electronic versions of the print issue.

=== 2000s–2010s ===
However, with the rise in popularity of the Internet, many computer magazines went bankrupt or transitioned to an online-only existence. Exceptions include Wired, which is more of a technology magazine than a computer magazine.

== Notable regular contributors to print computer magazines ==
Name	Occupation	Magazines (years of regular contributions)
(United States) Ken Arnold	Programmer	Unix Review (1980s–1990s)
(United Kingdom) Charlie Brooker	TV comedian, TV reviewer, newspaper columnist	PC Zone (1990s)
(United States) Orson Scott Card	Science fiction author	Ahoy!, Compute!
(United Kingdom) Chris Crawford	Game designer	BYTE, Computer Gaming World
(United States) Pamela Jones	Paralegal, legal blogger	Linux User, others
(United Kingdom) Stan Kelly-Bootle	Writer, consultant, programmer, songwriter	UNIX Review (1984–2000), OS/2 Magazine, Software Development
(United States) Nicholas Negroponte	Professor, investor	Wired magazine (1993–1998)
(United States) Jerry Pournelle	Science fiction author	BYTE (1980–2006)
(United Kingdom) Rhianna Pratchett	Game scriptwriter, journalist	PC Zone
(United States) Bruce Schneier	Security specialist, writer, cryptographer	Wired magazine
(United Kingdom) Charles Stross	Science fiction and fantasy author	Computer Shopper (UK magazine) (1994–2004)
(United States) Don Lancaster	Writer, consultant, programmer	Dr. Dobb's Journal, Byte, etc.

== See also ==
- Online magazine
- Magazine
- Online newspaper
