= HUB Uitgevers =

Dutch magazine publisher

- Type: Besloten Vennootschap
- Industry: Magazine publishing
- Founded: 1993
- Successor: Reshift Digital
- Headquarters: Haarlem, the Netherlands
- Area served: Benelux
- Key people: Wouter Hendrikse (Founder)
- Products: PC, IT, Gaming, Photography, Women's and Men's lifestyle magazines
- Number of employees: 100+
- Website: hub.nl at the Wayback Machine (archived 2012-02-09)

HUB Uitgevers (English: HUB Publishers) was a Dutch magazine publisher. HUB Uitgevers was founded in 1993 and has grown to be one of the leading IT publishers, with over 15 consumer titles, and a number of business-to-business magazines. More recently they ventured into the lifestyle segment publishing two women's and a men's magazine.

In November 2007, HUB Uitgevers took over four magazine titles from VNU Media: Computer Idee, PCM, Power Unlimited and the Dutch license for Gizmodo magazine. In 2010 HUB Uitgevers acquired a considerable stake in Focus Media, publisher of the Netherlands' oldest photography magazine.

On August 26, 2013, the publisher filed for bankruptcy. One day later the bankruptcy was granted.

== Publications ==
=== Technology ===
- Computer Idee
- Gizmodo (Dutch version)
- Hardware.Info magazine
- HET - Home Entertainment Today
- [N]Gamer (ISSN 1872-2342)
- PC Plus
- PC-Active
- Personal Computer Magazine (PCM)
- Power Unlimited
- Hardware.Info
- Linux Magazine
- NetOpus
- Vives
- Focus
- FotoMagazine.info

=== Lifestyle ===
- Jansen
- MATCH
- LOUDER (ISSN 2213-4646)
