= The Computer Contradictionary =

Satirical dictionary of computer industry terms

- Author: Stan Kelly-Bootle
- Language: English
- Publication date: May 1995
- Publication place: United States
- Media type: Print
- Pages: 256 pages
- ISBN: 0-262-61112-0

The Computer Contradictionary, by Stan Kelly-Bootle, is a satirical dictionary of computer industry terms. It is an example of "cynical lexicography" in the tradition of Ambrose Bierce's The Devil's Dictionary. Rather than offering a factual account of usage, its definitions are largely made up by the author.

The book was published in May 1995 by MIT Press and is an update of Kelly-Bootle's The Devil's DP Dictionary which appeared in 1981.

== Examples ==
Endless loop. See: Loop, endless

Loop, endless. See: Endless loop

Recursion. See: Recursion

== Reception ==
The Los Angeles Times, including the book in a review of more serious high-tech lexicons, wrote that it was "smartly-titled" but was an "awfully stupid book". ACM Computing Reviews suggested an approach of dipping into it, because "a dictionary is a difficult read".
