= Amateur Computer Club =

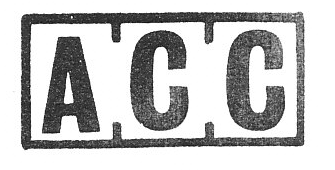
Logo of ACC (1973)

The Amateur Computer Club (ACC), founded in 1973, was an early British club "open to all interested in the design, construction or programming of computers as a hobby". Most of its members lived in the United Kingdom. In 1976 an educational journal described the growth of "hobbyist" computing and said "in [the UK] there is currently one shop ... and also an active Amateur Computer Club with over 600 members".

== Foundation ==
Starting the ACC was an initiative of Mike Lord of Basildon, Essex in March 1973. He published a note in the popular electronics magazine Wireless World with a proposal to write to him if one liked the idea of having a Computer Club.

== Activities ==
The primary way to support the members in their hobby was the ACC Newsletter (ACCN), with varied information pertinent to amateurs building, learning, using or just plainly interested in computers. The typewritten leaflet was published every 3 months starting with number 1 in March 1973. ACCN1 contained a description of the instruction set of a simple 10-bit computer designed by one of the first members: Ian Spencer.

In August 1973 it mentions an offer to demonstrate a homemade copy of a PDP-8 made by John Florentin. This machine had been demonstrated earlier in March 1973 at a meeting of the Surrey Radio Contact club in Croydon. Mike published nearly anything that passed by or was sent to him, such as availability (and data sheets) of surplus and obsolete computer hardware, how to get free computer time on a university computer, latest price quotes for the newest chips (Intel 4004 and 8008, memory), algorithms, code tables, etc.

Through the members list of ACC many contacts were made, enabling members to write to and meet each other, which resulted in meetings in several places.

== Current status ==
The ACC does not exist any more. It is not known when and how it expired. The last symptoms known were that local chapters were forming in several British cities that seemed to operate independently of the ACC.

== Other Clubs ==
The example of ACC was inspiring.

In ACCN vol 2 iss 3 of August 1974, the start of a new club was announced: Association Française des Amateurs Constructeurs d´Ordinateurs (AFACO) by J-C Ribes in Meudon, France.

In ACCN vol 5 iss 2 of June 1977, the start of a new club in Dutch language was announced: Hobby Computer Club (HCC) by Dick Barnhoorn, Leidschendam, Netherlands.

== See also ==
- ComputerTown UK
