= Hobby Computer Club =

Logo since 2011

The Hobby Computer Club (HCC; stylized hcc!) is a Dutch computer club, now based in Haarlem, the Netherlands. It was established on April 27, 1977, by a small group of people near the town of Leiden. It grew to become a nationally significant club of over 200,000 members in 2003.

== History ==
The HCC was inspired by the Amateur Computer Club founded in 1973 by Mike Lord. Dick Barnhoorn became a member of the ACC and after a few years started the HCC in the Netherlands and Belgium (for Dutch/Flemish speakers). In the beginning letters were sent to popular electronics and IT magazines. The initial logo of HCC was an adapted copy of the ACC logo. The first HCC meeting was in a building of the Delft University of Technology, at that moment the HCC had 12 members.

A small stenciled, A5 size, newsletter was published bimonthly called HCCN (HCC Nieuwsbrief) similar to ACCN (ACC Newsletter). After participating in a large event for technical hobbies in April 1978 membership increased from 200 to over 1000. Soon the HCC had branches in every part of the Netherlands, and through the years the HCC grew to more than 200,000 members. The small newsletter turned into a monthly computer magazine called Computer!Totaal. The HCC now also offers a free Internet service to its members, as well as free technical assistance with computer problems.

For many decades a big exhibition called the "HCC dagen" (HCC Days) was held in Jaarbeurs in Utrecht with thousands of attendees. A tradition started in 1977, for showing off the member's activities and giving commercial parties an opportunity to demonstrate new products and sell equipment and software. It was interrupted in 2010 because the commercial parties lost interest as internet was becoming their main sales platform. In 2011 HCC organised a similar event on a much smaller scale than before, HCC!digital.

== See also ==
- Microcomputer Club Nederland
