= UNIX Review =

Operating system and software magazine (1983–2000)

- Editor: Joe Casad, Rikki Endsley, Christi Bear
- Categories: Computer magazines
- Founded: 1983
- Final issue: 2000
- Country: United States
- Based in: Renton, Washington
- Language: English
- Website: unixreview.com at the Wayback Machine (archived 1998-01-27)
- ISSN: 0742-3136
- OCLC: 477140341

UNIX Review was an American magazine covering technical aspects of the UNIX operating system and C programming. Recognized for its in-depth technical analysis, the journal also reported on industry confabs and included some lighter fare.

== History and profile ==
It was founded in 1983. In 1985 it was acquired by Miller Freeman. The journal was renamed to UNIX Review's Performance Computing (UR/PC) Magazine with the April 1998 issue, and ceased publication in 2000. The online publication ceased in 2007. It was published by REVIEW Publications of Renton, Washington. The rights to the title passed to United Business Media (formerly CMP Media), which was absorbed by Informa in 2018.

== Regular contributors ==
- Andrew Binstock, (editor in chief from 1991–1997), wrote "Word Wrap from the Editor"
- John Chisholm (1992-1995), wrote "Currents" column
- Stan Kelly-Bootle, writer of the "Devil's Advocate" column
- Ken Arnold, writer of "The C Advisor" column
- Rich Morin, writer of "The Human Factor" and "The Internet Notebook" columns
- Joe "Zonker" Brockmeier, writer of the "Tool of the Month" column
- Ed Schaefer, writer of the "Shell Corner" column
- Dinah McNutt, writer of the "Daemons and Dragons" column
- Cameron Laird, regular contributor
- Emmett Dulaney, regular contributor
- Marcel Gagné, regular contributor
- Eric Foster-Johnson, regular contributor
