= Maurice de Hond =

Dutch pollster and entrepreneur (born 1947)

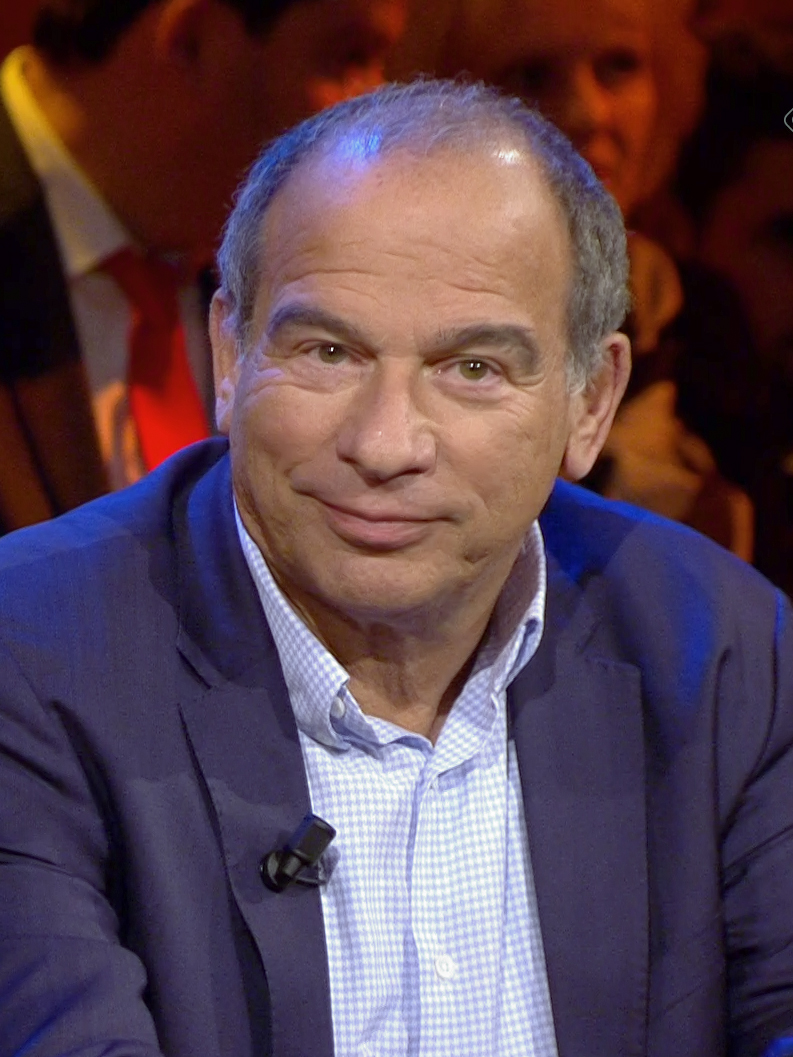
Maurice de Hond

Maurice de Hond (born 8 October 1947) is a Dutch pollster and entrepreneur. He is the founder of the Steve JobsSchool, an elementary school which gives each student an iPad to encourage individualized learning. As of 2016, 35 public schools in the Netherlands adopted the school model. Two Steve JobsSchools opened in South Africa in 2016. The schools closed after a negative report by government educational inspectors found that students who graduated from the schools were lacking severely in educational skills and the foundation running the schools declared bankruptcy in 2018.

== Career ==
Born in Amsterdam, De Hond studied human geography at the University of Amsterdam, obtaining a degree in 1971. He worked for the university, as assistant with the Sociaal Geografisch Instituut, but became a project leader for Interview-NSS in 1973. He founded Cebeon with Hedy d'Ancona in 1975, a market research firm targeting the non-profit sector, which he left in 1980 to become a director at Interview-NSS, later a commissioner until 1999. Starting in the mid-80s, De Hond started doing consultancy work for various companies, including Vendex (for which he led the computer department Microcomputer Club Nederland (MCN) of the Vroom & Dreesmann department store and the Dixons electricals store in the 1980s), ITT and Wegener. In 1998, he was one of the founders of Newconomy, an internet start-up, which after a stock exchange listing in 2000, saw a market cap of €400 million, but subsequently lost much of its market value. Eventually, De Hond had to resign from his leadership position. He now polls through his own company, and internet site Peil.nl.

== Deventer murder case ==
Since 2005, De Hond campaigned to reopen a murder case that happened in the Dutch city of Deventer. De Hond believed that a tax advisor named Ernest Louwes was wrongfully convicted, and that a handyman of the murdered woman, Michaël de Jong, was behind the murder. De Hond led his own investigation into the matter, but a subsequent investigation by the public prosecutors found no reason to reopen the case. De Jong brought De Hond to court over his allegations, for which De Hond refused to submit after the matter was closed. A Dutch court found De Hond at fault in continuation of his allegations, after which De Hond was reprimanded and forced to pay de Jong and his girlfriend over €100,000.
