= Stan Kelly-Bootle =

English archivist, computer scientist, and folk musician (1929–2014)

- Born: Stanley Bootle; 15 September 1929; Liverpool, Lancashire, England
- Died: 16 April 2014 (aged 84); Oswestry, Shropshire, England
- Burial place: Highgate Cemetery
- Other name: Stan Kelly
- Citizenship: British
- Education: Downing College, Cambridge
- Occupation: Computer scientist
- Years active: 1954–2000s
- Employers: IBM; Sperry UNIVAC; UNIX Review
- Known for: Folk-singing and songwriting; technology writing
- Notable work: "Liverpool Lullaby"; The Devil’s DP Dictionary; The Computer Contradictionary

Stanley Bootle, known as Stan Kelly-Bootle (15 September 1929 – 16 April 2014), was a British author, academic, singer-songwriter and computer scientist.

He took his stage name Stan Kelly from the Irish folk song "Kelly, the boy from Killane". His best-known song is the "Liverpool Lullaby" or "The Mucky Kid" which was first recorded in 1965. Kelly-Bootle achieved the first postgraduate degree in computer science in 1954, from the University of Cambridge, working for computer companies in the US and UK, before becoming a freelance consultant and writer.

== Early life ==
Stan Kelly-Bootle was born Stanley Bootle in Liverpool, Lancashire, on 15 September 1929 and grew up in the Wavertree area of the city. His parents were Arthur Bootle and Ada Gallagher.

== Education ==
Kelly-Bootle was schooled at the Liverpool Institute. He spent 1948–1950 doing his national service in the British Army, achieving the rank of Sgt. Instructor in RADAR. He attended Downing College, Cambridge, graduating with a first class degree in Numerical Analysis and Automatic Computing in 1954, the first postgraduate degree in computer science.

== Folk singing career ==
In 1954, Kelly-Bootle helped found the St. Lawrence Folk Song Society at Cambridge University. As a folk singer-songwriter, he performed under the name "Stan Kelly" (he was not known as "Stan Kelly-Bootle" in folk music circles), taken from the Irish folk song "Kelly, the Boy from Killane". He wrote some of his own tunes and lyrics set to traditional tunes, as well as having his songs recorded by others; he made over two hundred radio and television appearances and released several recordings.

His best-known song is the "Liverpool Lullaby" (also known as "The Mucky Kid") which was recorded in 1965 on the Three City Four LP and sung by Marian McKenzie. It was also sung by the Ian Campbell Folk Group on the Contemporary Campbells LP. It was later recorded by Judy Collins in 1966 for her album In My Life. Cilla Black recorded it three years later as the B-side to her pop hit "Conversations".

=== Discography ===
Solo releases include:

- I Chose Friden – Songs for Cybernetic Lovers. Computer humour songs recorded in 1963.
- Liverpool Packet, Topic Records release TOP 27, 1958. Songs about Liverpool.
- Songs for Swinging Landlords To, Topic Records release TOP 60. Rent protest and anti-landlord songs of both varieties.
- Wrote and produced a sound and song depiction of Merseyside called Echoes of Merseyside (LPDE 101) for the Liverpool Echo newspaper.
- O Liverpool We Love You, Transatlantic Records XTRA 1076, released 1969. This album was a tribute to Liverpool F.C., prepared with the team's cooperation. While creating the album, Kelly travelled with the team for both UK and European games for several years, and also for two seasons managed several players, including Kevin Keegan and Tommy Smith.

Other audio recordings include:

- Kelly performed the part of "The Rambler" in the BBC's 1958 production The Ballad of John Axon. This broadcast won the Italia Prize, and excerpts were subsequently released on a highlights LP. This was the first BBC radio ballad.
- Two tracks ("Liverpool Town" and "The Ould Mark II") on Revival in Britain, Vol 1, produced by Ewan MacColl, Folkways Records FW 8728, Library of Congress R62-1246.
- One track ("The Young Sailor Cut Down in His Prime") on Topic Sampler No. 2, Topic Records, TPS 145, 1966
- Performing on Stan Hugill's Shanties from the Seven Seas, HMV 1970

== Computing career ==
Kelly-Bootle achieved the first postgraduate degree in computer science in 1954, from the University of Cambridge. He started his computing career programming the pioneering EDSAC computer, designed and built at Mathematical Laboratory there. He worked for IBM in the United States and the UK from 1955 to 1970. From 1970 to 1973, he worked as Manager for University Systems for Sperry UNIVAC. He also lectured at the University of Warwick.

== Writing career ==
In 1973, Kelly-Bootle left Sperry UNIVAC and became a freelance consultant, writer and programmer. He was known in the computer community for his books The Devil's DP Dictionary and its second edition, The Computer Contradictionary (1995), cynical lexicons in the vein of Ambrose Bierce's The Devil's Dictionary. Kelly-Bootle authored or co-authored several serious textbooks and tutorials on subjects such as the Motorola 68000 family of CPUs, programming languages including various C compilers, and the Unix operating system.

He authored the "Devil's Advocate" column in UNIX Review from 1984 to 2000, and had columns in Computer Language ("Bit by Bit", 1989–1994), OS/2 Magazine ("End Notes", 1994–97) and Software Development ("Seamless Quanta", October 1995 – May 1997). He contributed columns and articles to several other computer industry magazines, including ACM Queue, and AI/Expert. From 2000 to 2004, he wrote an online monthly column, Son of Devil's Advocate (or SODA).

Kelly-Bootle's magazine articles were known for their wordplay, criticism of silly technical marketing and vocabulary (he referred often to the computer community's "laxicon"), and commentary on the industry in general.

While most of his writing was oriented towards the computer industry, he wrote a few books related to his other interests, including:

- Liverpool Lullabies, The Stan Kelly Songbook, SING Publications, 1960. Second edition, 1976.
- Lern Yourself Scouse – How to Talk Proper in Liverpool, Scouse Press, 1961, written with Fritz Spiegl and Frank Shaw. Sixteen editions published through 1991.
- The Terrace Muse, An Anthology of Soccer Songs and Chants, serialized in the Daily Express in 1970.

== Death ==
Stan Kelly-Bootle died on 16 April 2014, aged 84, in hospital in Oswestry, Shropshire. His ashes were interred on the eastern side of Highgate Cemetery on 22nd October 2015.
