= Dixons (Netherlands) =

Dutch electricals retailer

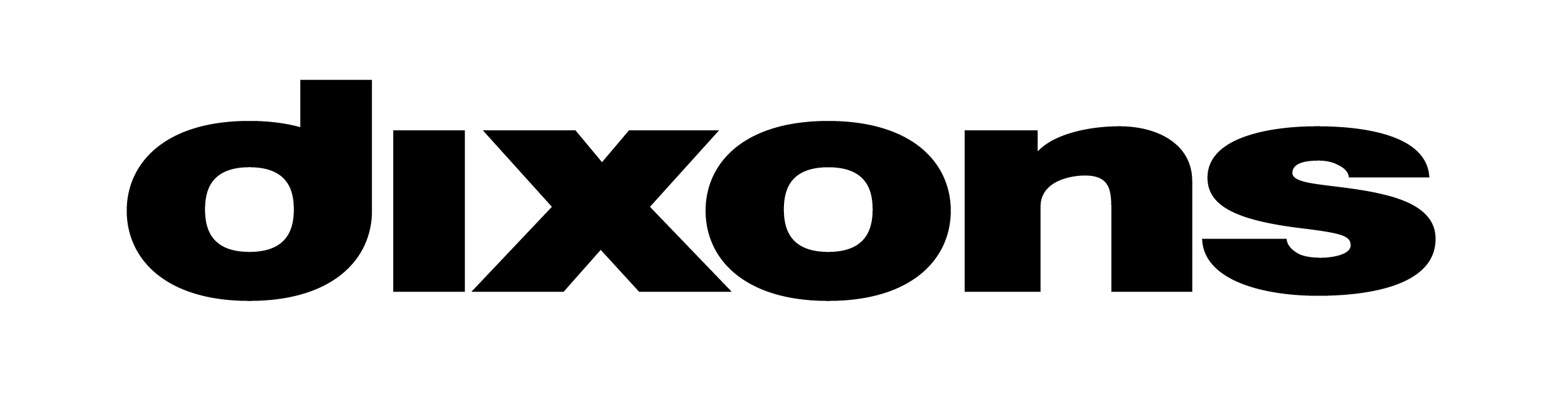

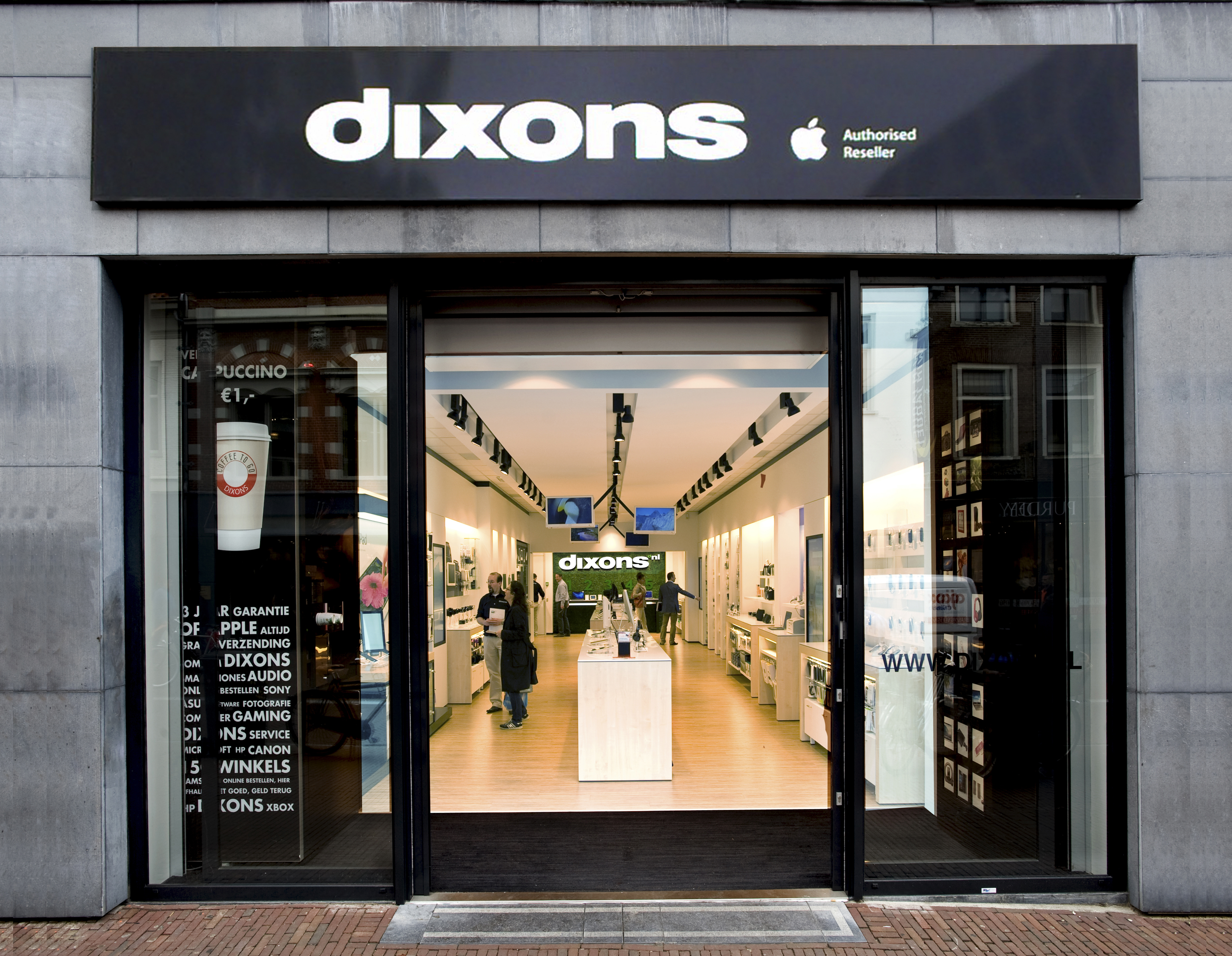
- A store in 'new style'
- Industry: Retail
- Products: Electronics
- Website: www.Dixons.nl

Dixons is a Dutch chain of stores specialising in what it refers to as leisure time electronics. This means that Dixons does not sell products like washing machines or televisions but does provide things like digital cameras, PC's, MP3 players, gaming consoles and mobile phones.

Originally launched by Dixons of the United Kingdom (now Dixons Carphone plc) as nothing more than Netherlands-based branches of the British electrical store Dixons, the Dutch arm of the company was sold to Amsterdam-based company Vendex KBB (now Maxeda) in the 1970s. They changed the store format to what it is now, before selling the company to Dexcom in 2006. There are now over 180 Dixons stores in the Netherlands. The Dutch-based Dixons no longer has any affiliation with Dixons Carphone. In 2011 Dexcom was taken over by Basgroup.

On 29 September 2015 Basgroup went into administrative receivership. Shortly thereafter, on 5 October it was declared bankrupt. On 12 October, Relevant Holdings (who had acquired the Dutch Branch of The Phone House) were announced as the new owner for Dixons Netherlands; and a decision was made to close 55 of the then 88 shops.

This reflects the pattern made in the UK, following the merger of Dixons Retail and Carphone Warehouse to form Dixons Carphone.

In 2006 Dutch department store Vroom & Dreesmann opened a small number of franchised in-store branches of Dixons in some of its stores. The number of so-called shop-in-shops has increased to 30 by the end of 2007.

On 29 February 2016 it was announced that the Dixons stores would close. The chain continued as a webshop.

== See also ==
- Dixons UK
- Dixons Carphone
